= King Faisal Foundation =

Philanthropic organization (1976)

- مؤسسة الملك فيصل الخيرية
- Formation: 1976
- Founders: Abdullah Al Faisal; Mohammad Al Faisal; Khalid Al Faisal; Saud Al Faisal; Abdul Rahman Al Faisal; Saad Al Faisal; Bandar Al Faisal; Turki Al Faisal
- Type: Philanthropic organization
- Purpose: Research, education, awards, human development, healthcare, humanitarian aid, donations
- Headquarters: Riyadh, Saudi Arabia
- Region served: Worldwide
- Key people: Khalid Al Faisal (Managing Director)
- Website: www.kff.com

The King Faisal Foundation (Arabic: مؤسسة الملك فيصل الخيرية; KFF), is an international philanthropic organization established in 1976 with the intent of preserving and perpetuating King Faisal bin Abdulaziz's legacy. The foundation was set up by the sons of King Faisal bin Abdulaziz Al Saud. It is one of the largest charities in the world.

== Programs and centers ==
=== King Faisal International Prize ===
The foundation presents an annual prize, King Faisal International Prize, to "dedicated men and women whose contributions make a positive difference" in several fields. Each of the five annual prizes consist of a certificate hand-written in Diwani calligraphy summarizing the laureate's work; a 24 carat 200 gram gold medal—uniquely cast for each winner; and a cash prize of SR 750,000 (US$200,000). The prizes are awarded at a ceremony in Riyadh, Saudi Arabia, by the king of Saudi Arabia. The first King Faisal International Prize was awarded to the Pakistani scholar Abul A'la Maududi in the year 1979 for his service to Islam.

=== King Faisal Center for Research and Islamic Studies ===
The King Faisal Center for Research and Islamic Studies (KFCRIS) was established in 1983. The center is dedicated to serving Islamic civilization, supporting academic research, and encouraging cultural and scientific activities in a number of fields. The center's library holds more than 200,000 titles in Arabic and European languages, in addition to 5,000 periodicals and approximately 30,000 university theses. The center hosts one of the most significant collections of Islamic manuscripts in the world, with no fewer than 28,500 manuscripts and some 180,000 microfilms. The majority of microfilms have been obtained through agreements with the Bibliothèque nationale of Paris, the Library of Congress, the British Library and other major manuscript-holding institutions.

=== Other programs ===
KFF established the King Faisal International School (KFS), an elementary school, in 1991 that operates in Riyadh, Saudi Arabia. In 2008, the KFF founded Alfaisal University, a university located in Riyadh, Saudi Arabia. The KFF founded Effat University, a university for women located in Jeddah, Saudi Arabia. Effat University is considered the first private woman college in Saudi Arabia.

The KFF has run a Painting and Patronage initiative since 1999.

=== Digital Archives and AI (2024–2026) ===
In recent years, the King Faisal Foundation has transitioned toward a digital-first philanthropic model. As of 2026, the Foundation's research arm, KFCRIS, has completed the digitization of over 1.5 million rare manuscripts and historical documents. This was followed by the launch of an AI-driven scholarly platform designed to facilitate global access to Islamic and social science research.

== See also ==
- List of things named after Saudi kings
