= Al Bandari bint Abdul Rahman Al Saud =

Saudi royal (died 2019)

- Died: 15 March 2019
- Burial: 16 March 2019; Al Oud Cemetery, Riyadh
- Spouse: Fahd Al Damer
- Issue: Two daughters
Names
- Al Bandari bint Abdul Rahman bin Faisal bin Abdulaziz bin Abdul Rahman Al Saud
- House: Al Saud
- Father: Abdul Rahman bin Faisal Al Saud
- Mother: Moudi bint Khalid Al Saud
- Education: King Saud University; Harvard University

Al Bandari bint Abdul Rahman Al Saud (Arabic: البندري بنت عبد الرحمن الفيصل آل سعود; died 15 March 2019) was a Saudi woman who was a member of the Saudi royal family. She was a well-known philanthropist, director of King Khalid Foundation and also held posts in charitable organizations and non-governmental organizations in Saudi Arabia.

== Early life and education ==
Al Bandari was a granddaughter of two Saudi kings: King Faisal (r. 1964–1975) was her paternal grandfather and King Khalid (r. 1975–1982) her maternal grandfather. Her parents were Prince Abdul Rahman and Princess Moudi. Al Bandari had two siblings, Princess Sara and Prince Saud.

She received a bachelor's degree in English literature from King Saud University. She also obtained a master's degree in public policy from Harvard University's John F. Kennedy School of Government in 1998.

== Career and activities ==
Al Bandari served as the director of King Khalid Foundation from its inception to her death in March 2019. She cofounded the Shaghaf programme and was a member of the Women's Charity Association, Ifta Society for Hyperactivity Disorder and the Al Nahda Philanthropic Society for Women. She collaborated with the Bill and Melinda Gates Foundation in the establishment of the Shaghaf programme, a fellowship programme, in which young Saudis are enrolled in a fifteen-month training programme to be educated as non-profit leaders in Saudi Arabia. Another of her initiatives was Princess Al Bandari Al Faisal Fellowship at her alma mater, the Kennedy School, which was founded to contribute to students from the Arab League. She was also a member of the TAKREEM jury board.

Through King Khalid Foundation, Al Bandari initiated the 'No More Abuse' campaign in 2013, the first movement against domestic abuse in Saudi Arabia. One of the outcomes of the campaign was the adoption of a law drafted by the Foundation on the prevention of the abuse of women and children.

== Personal life and death ==
Al Bandari married Fahd Al Damer with whom she had two daughters, Luluwah and Hana.

Al Bandari died on 15 March 2019. Funeral prayers were held for her following the Asr prayer at the Imam Turki bin Abdullah Mosque in Riyadh next day. Various leaders sent cables to Saudi King Salman to convey their condolences, including Oman ruler Sultan Qaboos, UAE President Sheikh Khalifa bin Zayed Al Nahyan, Vice President and Prime Minister Sheikh Mohammed bin Rashid Al Maktoum, Abu Dhabi Crown Prince Sheikh Mohammed bin Zayed Al Nahyan and Bahraini Crown Prince Salman bin Hamad Al Khalifa.
