= Mohammed bin Faisal Al Saud =

Saudi Arabian royal and businessman (1937–2017)

- Born: 1934; Taif, Saudi Arabia
- Died: 14 January 2017 (aged 82–83)
- Burial: 16 January 2017; Al Adl cemetery, Mecca
- Spouse: Muna bint Abd al Rahman bin Azzam Pasha
- Issue: Prince Amr; Princess Maha; Princess Reem
Names
- Mohammed bin Faisal bin Abdulaziz bin Abdul Rahman bin Faisal Al Saud
- House: Al Saud
- Father: King Faisal
- Mother: Iffat Al Thunayan
- Education: Menlo College

Mohammed bin Faisal Al Saud (Arabic: محمد بن فيصل آل سعود, Moḥammed bin Fayṣal Āl Saʿūd; 14 November 1934 – 14 January 2017) was a Saudi prince and businessman. He was a son of King Faisal and one of the grandsons of Saudi Arabia's founder King Abdulaziz. He was one of the pioneers in the establishment of Islamic banking and Islamic insurance.

== Early life and education ==
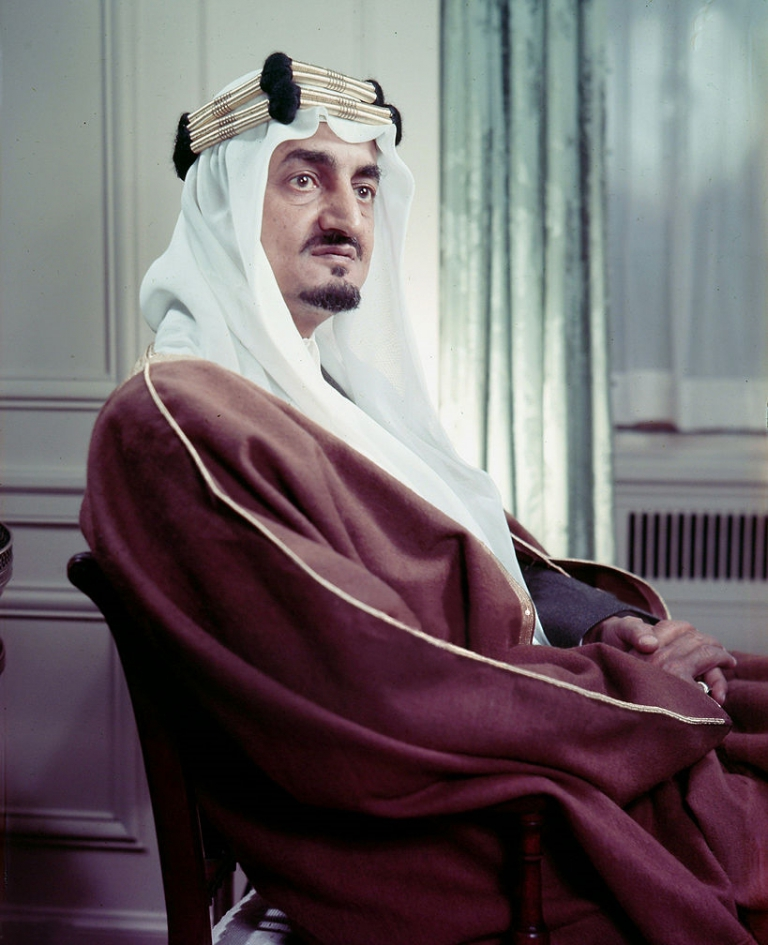
King Faisal, father of Mohammed

Mohammed bin Faisal was born in Taif in 14 November 1934 He was the second child and eldest son of King Faisal and Iffat Al Thunayan. His full siblings were Sara bint Faisal, Latifa bint Faisal, Saud bin Faisal, Abdul Rahman bin Faisal, Bandar bin Faisal, Turki bin Faisal, Luluwah bint Faisal and Haifa bint Faisal. Mohammed also had half-siblings from his father's other marriages, including Abdullah, Khalid and Saad.

Mohammed bin Faisal started his education at Al Madrasa An Numuthagiya (The Model School) which was opened by his parents in Taif in 1942. He was the first of his siblings to study abroad. He attended both Lawrenceville School and Hun School. Then, he graduated from Swarthmore College in 1961. In 1963, he earned his bachelor of science degree in business administration at Menlo College in California.

== Early career ==
Mohammed bin Faisal began his career in 1963 at the Saudi Arabian Monetary Agency (SAMA) and worked under Anwar Ali, director of SAMA. The same year, Prince Mohammed established the Red Sea Club in Jeddah which organized swimming competitions and art exhibitions. Although it was closed soon, the Club is the precursor of the Saudi swimming federation.

In August 1965, Mohammed was appointed director of the saline water conversion office at the ministry of water and agriculture. He played a significant role in the establishment of the water desalination program during this period. He became deputy minister of water and agriculture, responsible for saline water affairs in 1974, and was also appointed as the governor of the newly founded saline water conversion corporation in November of the same year. He resigned from office in July 1977.

== Business activities ==
Mohammed bin Faisal began to be involved in business after his resignation. During this period, he financially supported a study about the feasibility of bringing Antarctic icebergs to Mecca. He established a firm for this goal, Iceberg Transport International. On 17 October 1977, he presented his proposal at a conference in London. His plan was the most promising scheme discussed at the conference. However, the findings of the study indicated that it was not feasible, since no iceberg could survive if it passes the equator.

His most significant investments were in the fields of banking and finance, making him one of the pioneers in Islamic banking. Prince Mohammed was the founder of the Faisal Islamic Bank of Egypt that was established in Cairo in 1977. The bank was officially launched in 1979. The Sudan branch of the bank was also opened in 1977. The reason for his investments in Egypt instead of his native Saudi Arabia was the sceptical approach of the Saudi royal family towards the Islamic banking initiatives.

Prince Mohammed cofounded Dar Al Maal Al Islami Trust (DMI group) in 1981. Other cofounders of the company included the following leading figures: Zayed bin Sultan Al Nahyan, Isa bin Salman Al Khalifa, Ibrahim Kamel, Mohammed Zia Ul Hak, and senior members of the Al Saud. The company was established in Geneva and is an international Islamic finance organization and a parent institution for 55 Islamic banks. It is a Bahamas-incorporated holding company. In Pakistan, the bank was named as the Islamic Investment Company of Pakistan. In the mid-1980s, his DMI group lost a significant market share in Egypt.

Through his Turkish associate Ahmet Gürkan, who would be a deputy of the Justice and Development Party, Prince Mohammed held private meetings with the military President Kenan Evren, other generals who were part of the military council and Prime Minister Bülend Ulusu to establish a branch of the bank in Turkey. His attempts resulted in the start of the bank under the name Faisal Finans Kurumu (Turkish: Faisal Finance Institution) in 1984. Salih Özcan, a member of the Muslim World League and a politician from the National Salvation Party, and Tevfik Paksu were also instrumental in the establishment of the bank in Turkey.

Prince Mohammed founded Faisal Private Bank in 1990 which is the pioneer banking institution in Islamic finance industry. He was the chairman of its board of directors and of the Islamic Finance Group. Faisal Private Bank has several branches in different countries, including Switzerland. Its Switzerland branch was granted full banking license by the Swiss Federal Banking Commission (FINMA) in August 2006. Prince Mohammed was also the president of Jeddah-based Islamic Development Bank which was founded in 1975.

In addition to the banking sector, Prince Mohammed had other business enterprises. He was a shareholder of Saudi and Gulf Enterprise Ltd. based in Jeddah.

=== Other positions ===
Mohammed bin Faisal established Al Manarat International Schools which have branches in Saudi Arabia and in other countries. He was the chairman of the board of trustees of the King Faisal Foundation. He was also a member of the Effat University's board of founders and of trustees.

== Controversy ==
Following the 9/11 terrorist attacks, the families of the victims launched a lawsuit against Prince Mohammed along with two other members of the Al Saud, namely Prince Sultan and Prince Turki, in addition to other people whom they accused of financing Al Qaeda. In 2009, further evidence was gathered by the families, and a Washington DC–based lawyer, Michael Kellogg, represented Prince Mohammed in the lawsuit.

== Personal life ==
Mohammed bin Faisal married Muna bint Abdul Rahman bin Azzam Pasha, daughter of Azzam Pasha. He had three children: Amr, Maha and Reem. His son, Prince Amr, is also a businessman dealing with finance. His daughter Reem is a well-known photographer.

Mohammed bin Faisal was the winner of the 2007 IDB Prize in Islamic Banking and Finance which is awarded by Islamic Research and Training Institute of the Islamic Development Bank. He was among the 500 influential Muslims list developed by Georgetown University's center for Muslim-Christian understanding in 2009. One of Prince Mohammed's residences was in Paris.

== Death ==
On 14 January 2017, Prince Mohammed died, and it was announced that the funeral prayers would be performed at the Grand Mosque in Mecca.
