= Turki Al-Faisal =

Saudi royal and government official (born 1945)

His Royal Highness Turki Al-Faisal
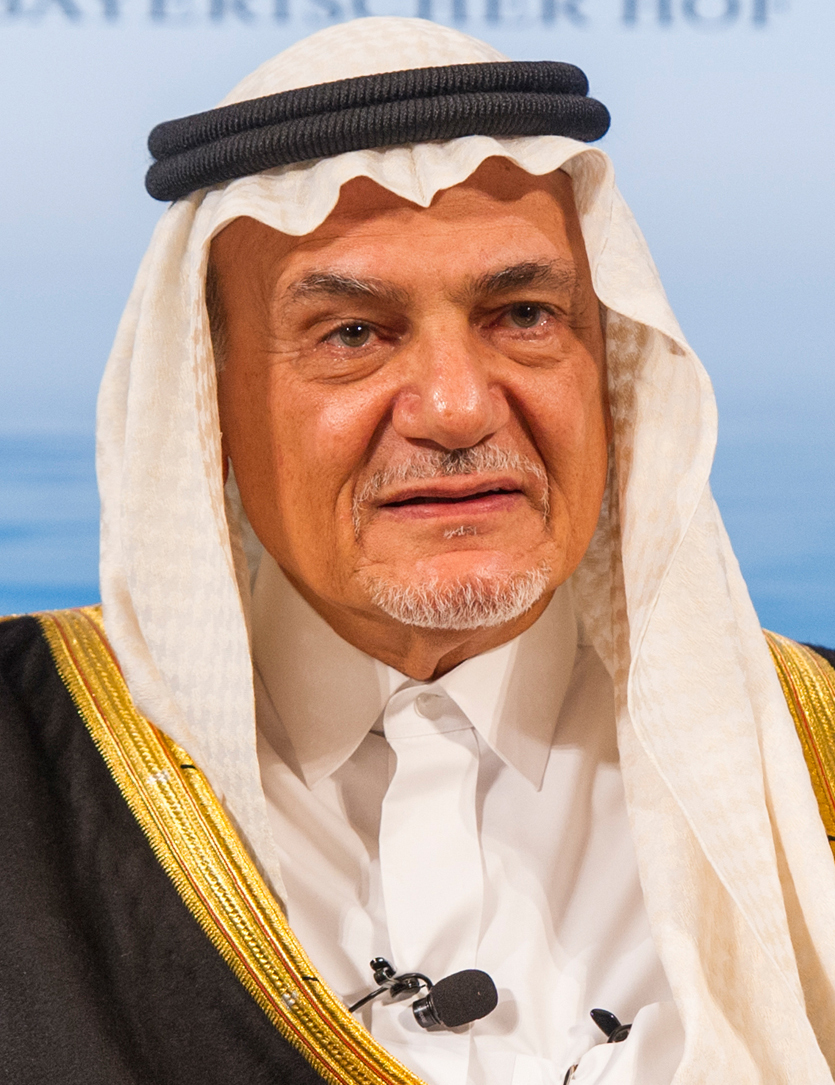
- Prince Turki in 2014

Director General of Al Mukhabarat Al A'amah
- In office 1979–2001
- Monarchs: King Khalid; King Fahd
- Preceded by: Kamal Adham
- Succeeded by: Nawwaf bin Abdulaziz Al Saud

Saudi Arabian Ambassador to the United States
- In office 2005–2007
- Monarch: King Abdullah
- Preceded by: Bandar bin Sultan Al Saud
- Succeeded by: Adel Al Jubeir

Personal details
- Born: 15 February 1945 (age 81) Mecca, Saudi Arabia
- Spouse: Nouf bint Fahd bin Khalid Al Saud
- Issue: Prince Faisal; Prince Abdulaziz
Names
- Turki bin Faisal bin Abdulaziz bin Abdul Rahman Al Saud
- House: Al Saud
- Father: King Faisal
- Mother: Iffat bint Mohammad Al Thunayan

Turki bin Faisal Al Saud (Arabic: تركي بن فيصل آل سعود, romanized: Turkī ibn Fayṣal Āl Su'ūd; born 15 February 1945), commonly known as Turki Al-Faisal, is a Saudi prince and former government official who served as head of Saudi Arabia's General Intelligence Presidency from 1979 to 2001.

He is a grandson of Saudi Arabia's founder King Abdulaziz and son of King Faisal. He is chairman of the King Faisal Foundation's Center for Research and Islamic Studies.

From 1979 to 2001, Prince Turki was director general of Al Mukhabarat Al 'Ammah, Saudi Arabia's intelligence agency, resigning from the position on 1 September 2001, ten days before the September 11 attacks in which 15 Saudi nationals hijacked commercial American airliners.

Prince Turki subsequently served as ambassador to the Court of St. James's and the United States.

== Early life and education ==
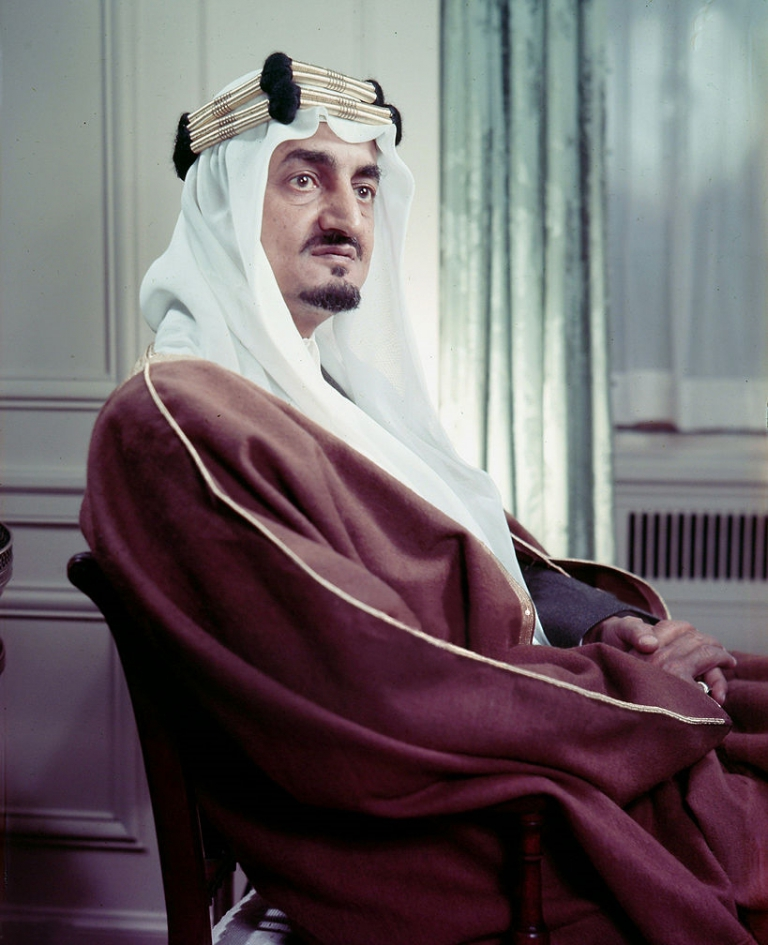
King Faisal, father of Turki

Prince Turki was born on 15 February 1945 in Mecca. He is the seventh child and youngest son of King Faisal and Iffat bint Mohammad Al Thunayan. His mother was born to a Turkish mother and an Arab father. He is a full-brother of Sara bint Faisal, Mohammed bin Faisal, Latifa bint Faisal, Saud bin Faisal, Abdul Rahman bin Faisal, Bandar bin Faisal, Luluwah bint Faisal and Haifa bint Faisal. In May 1978, Time magazine reported that Prince Turki was the favorite son of Princess Iffat.

Turki bin Faisal received his primary and some secondary education at a school in Taif which was built by his parents. When he was fourteen, his father sent him to Lawrenceville, New Jersey to complete his secondary education at the Lawrenceville School from which he graduated in 1963. He graduated in the class of 1968 (alongside future U.S. President Bill Clinton) of Edmund A. Walsh School of Foreign Service at Georgetown University. Turki also did further studies at Princeton, Cambridge, and the University of London where he took courses in Islamic law and jurisprudence.

== Career ==
After returning to the Kingdom, Turki was appointed an adviser in the Royal Court in 1973.

== Director of Saudi Arabia General Intelligence Directorate ==
Prince Turki began his political career as deputy to his uncle, Kamal Adham, and then, his successor as the head of Al Mukhabarat Al A'amah (General Intelligence Directorate), a position he held for 23 years—from 1979 until just 10 days before the September 11 attacks in 2001. He took part in organizing a military operation to remove the hostage-taking terrorists from Masjid al-Haram (the Sacred Mosque) in Mecca during the Grand Mosque Seizure in November 1979.

Turki claimed that in the months before the September 11 attacks, his intelligence agency knew that something alarming was being planned: "In the summer of 2001, I took one of the warnings about something spectacular about to happen to the Americans, British, French, and Arabs. We didn't know where, but we knew that something was being brewed."

Prince Turki's resignation was unexpected since his term had been extended on 24 May 2001 for another four years. He was replaced by Nawaf bin Abdul Aziz in the post who had "no background in intelligence whatsoever." The New York Times later reports: "The timing of Turki's removal—August 31—and his Taliban connection raise the question: Did the Saudi regime know that bin Laden was planning his attack against the US?"

After King Fahd's stroke in 1995, Prince Turki had a minor disagreement with Prince Abdullah who did not want to be briefed by him.

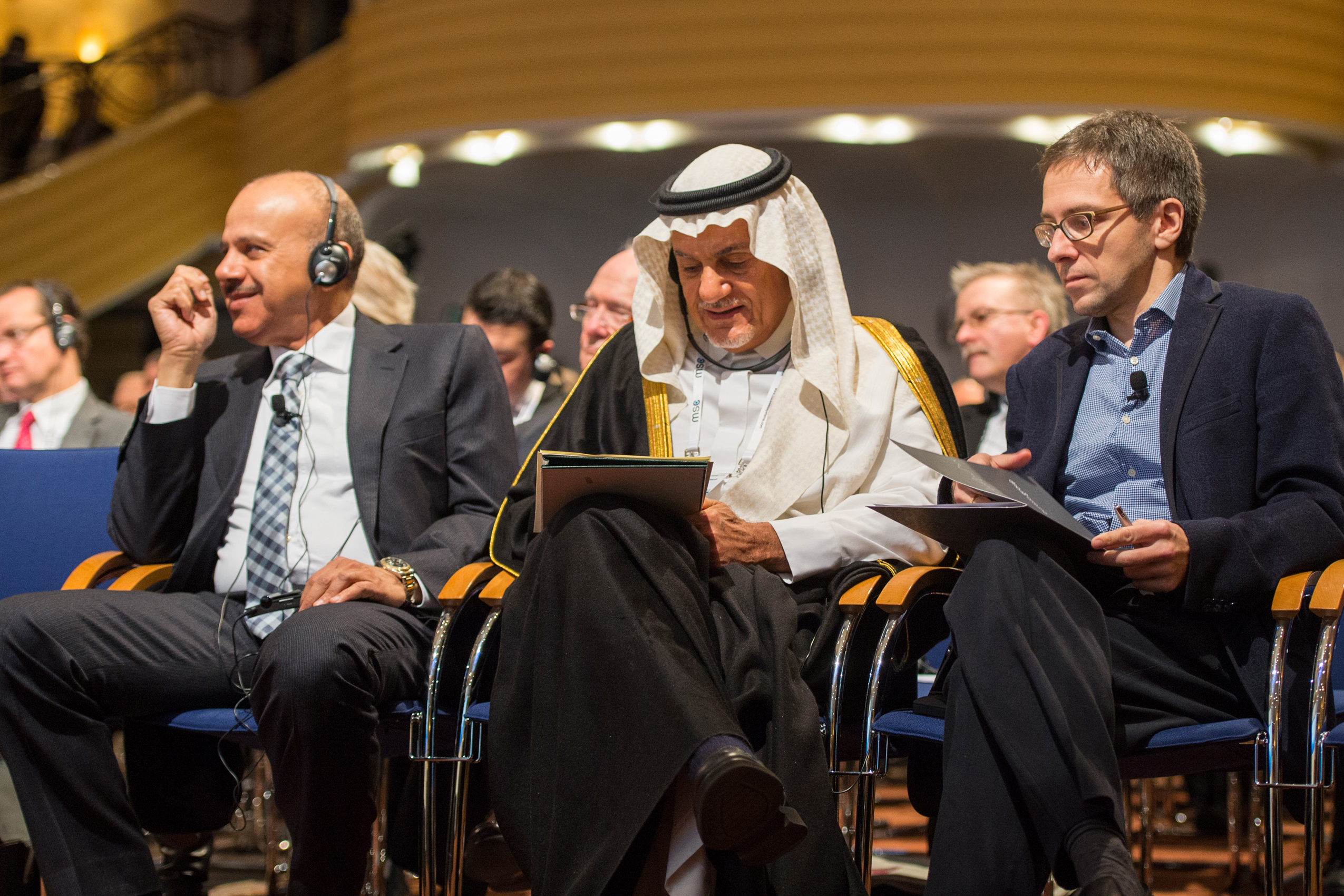
Prince Turki at the 50th Munich Security Conference in 2014

=== Osama bin Laden and Al Qaeda ===
Saudi intelligence joined Pakistan's intelligence service and the CIA in funding the mujahideen fighters in Afghanistan. Turki last met with Osama bin Laden in early 1990 when Osama bin Laden was interested in aiding against the South Yemen communists. His intelligence agency kept careful track of bin Laden from the beginning of his rise.

In 1993, Turki helped mediate between warring factions in Afghanistan. In early 1996, Sudan offered to extradite bin Laden to Saudi Arabia. Clinton called on Turki to bring bin Laden back to Saudi Arabia for a quick execution. Saudi Arabia denied the request and Osama left Sudan for Afghanistan.

A continued connection to bin Laden was falsely claimed by Paris Match magazine. In December 2004, Turki accepted substantial libel damages and an apology from Paris Match over claims he himself was linked to the 11 September attacks.

In 2002, Prince Turki was named in a multibillion-dollar lawsuit by the families of 11 September victims, alleging that he and other Saudi princes, banks, and charities may have funded the terrorists involved in the attack. His involvement was also strongly implied in the Michael Moore documentary Fahrenheit 911. A reporter for the Baltimore Chronicle claimed he was flown out of the United States shortly after the terrorist attacks, but the claim disappeared from later versions of the article. Prince Turki described Fahrenheit 911 as "grossly unfair" to Saudis.

Prince Turki maintains that he had no contact with bin Laden since Iraq's invasion of Kuwait in August 1990. He claims to have secretly negotiated with Taliban leader Mullah Mohammad Omar in 1998 in an attempt to have bin Laden extradited to Saudi Arabia, but the negotiations were unsuccessful. In a November 2001 interview, Turki expressed support for the US operation in Afghanistan against the Taliban and al-Qaeda. In 2005, a US federal judge ruled that Saudi officials including Turki were immune from the lawsuit. Turki has severely criticized al-Qaeda, calling it an "evil cult."

However, the allegations continue to dog Turki, with a court affidavit filed on 3 February 2015, claiming that Zacarias Moussaoui served as a courier between bin Laden and Turki in the late 1990s, long after Turki claims to have broken off his relationship with bin Laden. The Saudi government continues to deny any involvement claiming that there is no evidence to support Moussaoui's allegations due to the fact that Moussaoui's own lawyers presented evidence of his mental incompetence during his trial.

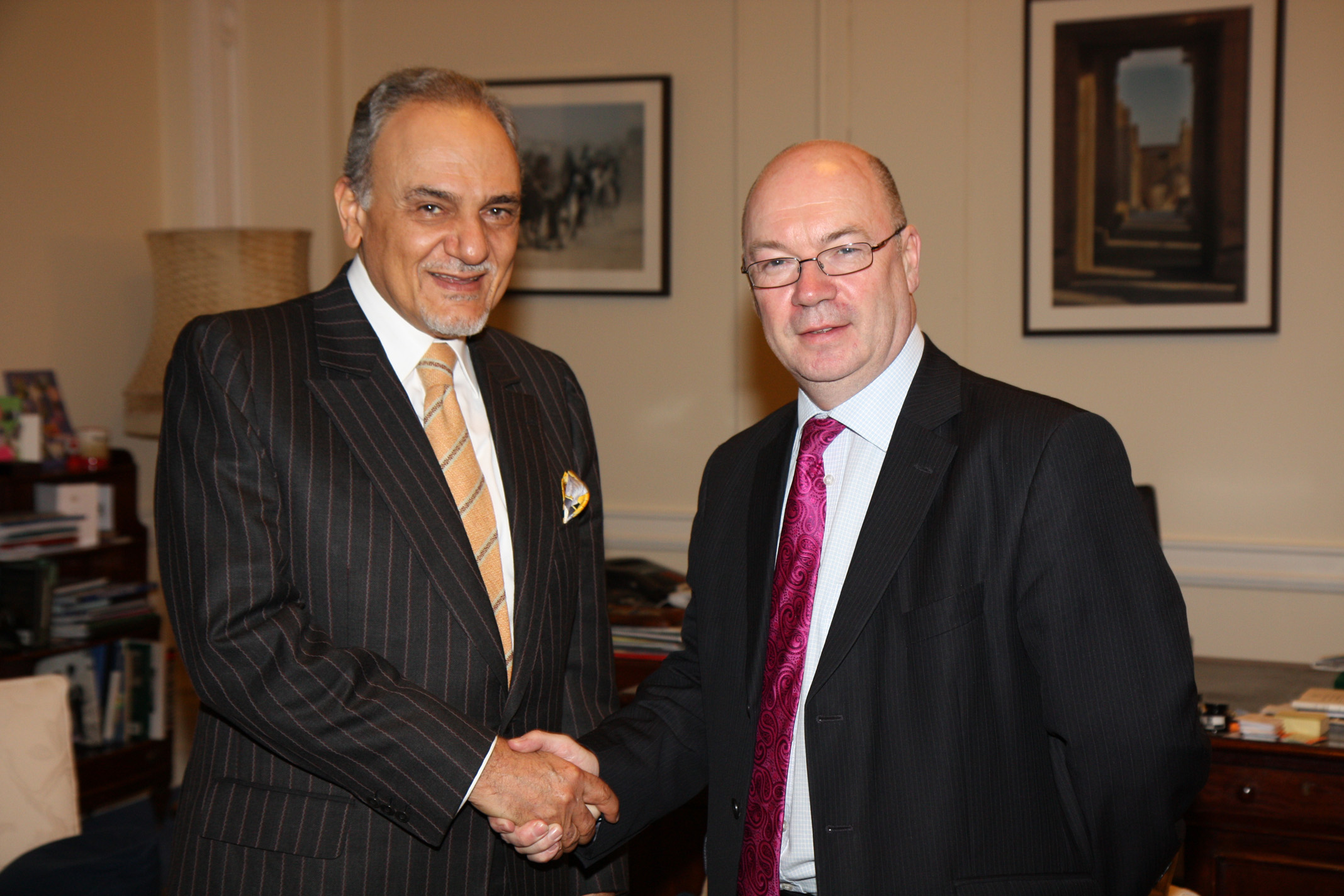
Foreign Office Minister Alistair Burt meeting Prince Turki, chairman, King Faisal Centre for Research and Islamic Studies in London, 15 March 2011.

== Ambassador to the United Kingdom ==
Prince Turki was appointed ambassador to the Court of Saint James's in London, and to Ireland, from January 2003. He served as ambassador until 2005 and was well respected by British diplomats.

== Ambassador to the United States ==
In July 2005, it was announced that Prince Turki would succeed Bandar bin Sultan as Saudi ambassador to the United States. He served as ambassador to the United States from July 2005 until 11 December 2006. Adel al-Jubeir succeeded him as ambassador to the United States.

Prince Turki spent much of his time as ambassador to the United States traveling around the country, visiting 37 states. Turki advocated that the United States engage in direct talks with Iran but other high-ranking Saudi officials, including Turki's predecessor as ambassador, Prince Bandar bin Sultan, supported military action to halt Iran's alleged nuclear weapons program.

He argued that the Palestinian-Israeli issue, not Iran, was more important for the United States and called on the Bush Administration to revive the peace process. He also argued that diplomacy with Iran was the best way to prevent problems. The Administration disliked his stance and made it difficult for him to arrange visits to the White House. The White House preferred Bandar's more aggressive approach and welcomed Bandar instead.

=== Resignation ===
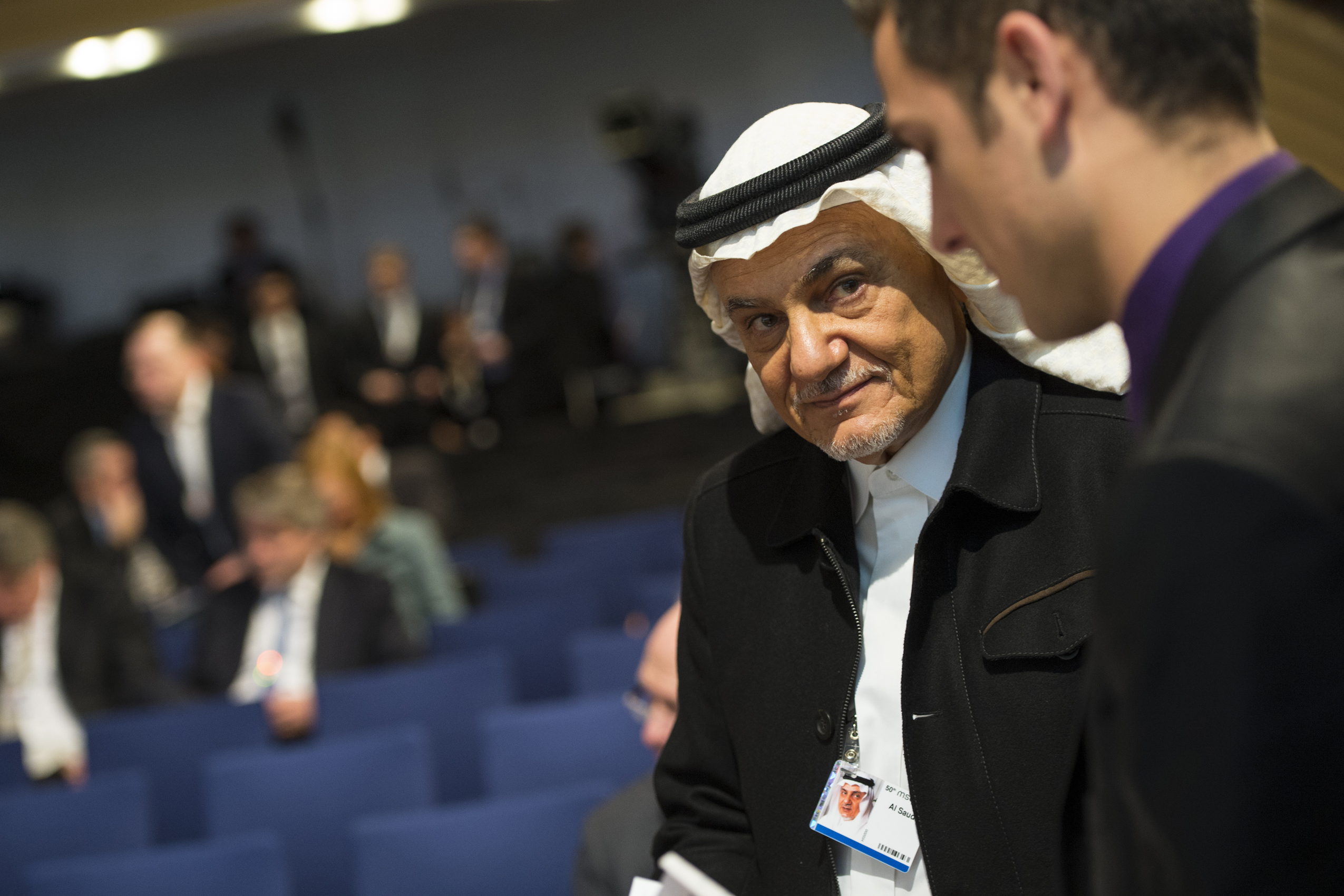
Prince Turki at MSC 2014

Prince Bandar's visits to the White House undermined Prince Turki and Prince Turki's goal of engaging in public diplomacy was weakened because of a shortage of money to fund the embassy and his public relations program. On the other hand, there were internal disputes over Saudi Arabia's Iraq policy, leading to tensions between Prince Turki and senior members of the royal family.

Turki was angered by the fact that when his own king had asked then Vice President Dick Cheney to meet at short notice in Riyadh, Turki was not invited to attend – an unusual omission for Saudi summit meetings. In addition, Turki's brother Foreign Minister Prince Saud Al Faisal did not write the post-summit briefing for Turki; Bandar did.

King Abdullah is reported to have preferred Bandar bin Sultan as the King's intermediary between Riyadh and Washington D.C. Turki's resignation may have been in protest. He abruptly resigned in early December 2006 after 15 months as an ambassador. His predecessor, Prince Bandar bin Sultan, worked in the same post for 22 years. Prince Turki returned in January 2007 after the Hajj Pilgrimage to formally announce his departure. Some analysts claim he intentionally attracted attention. He said he wanted to spend time with family. His resignation was initially reported by The Washington Post, not by the royal court or official sources. Turki retired from public office in February 2007.

== King Faisal Foundation and King Faisal Center for Research and Islamic Studies ==
Shortly after the passing of King Faisal, Prince Turki and his siblings established the King Faisal Foundation to invest in education in Saudi Arabia.

As chairman of King Faisal Center for Research and Islamic Studies, Prince Turki compared energy independence in American politics to baby-kissing. He stated that American politicians must be courageous against demagoguery. He lauded his country's efforts in education and believes that Saudis can succeed only through education. He visited India in December 2011.

== Views and opinions ==
=== 9/11 attacks ===
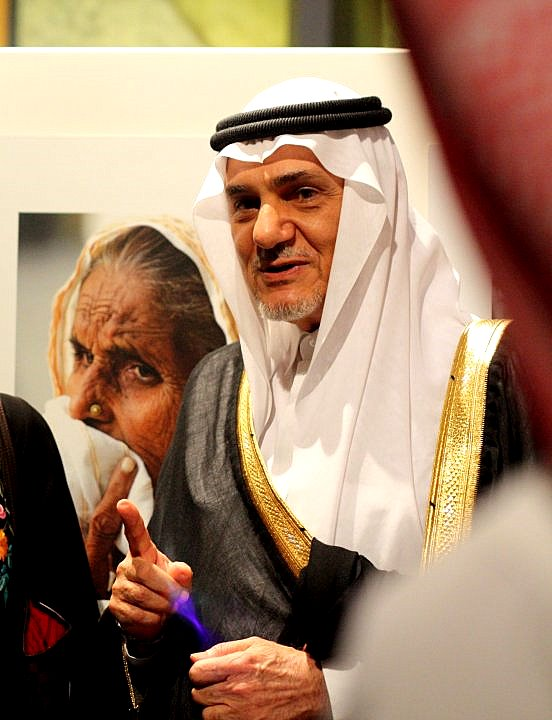
Prince Turki in 2010

Prince Turki directly challenged Sheikh Abdullah Al Turki, secretary-general of the World Muslim League and a member of the Council of Senior Ulema after 9/11 attacks, arguing that "those responsible for affairs of state are the rulers," whereas religious scholars "only act in an advisory capacity." On 15 October 2001, Turki, writing in Alsharq Alawsat, stated "God help us from Satan. You [Osama bin Laden] are a rotten seed like the son of Noah, ... and the flood will engulf you like it engulfed him." In an interview on Saudi TV on 5 November 2001, Turki argued "The religious edicts issued by [bin Laden] are the main evidence [for his guilt] because they call for attacking American soldiers and civilians. Only those people devoid of feelings will still ask for evidence. ... Those who still call for evidence are closing their eyes to the facts and are searching for justification of [bin Laden's] acts."

=== Afghanistan ===
Prince Turki criticized equating jihad with acts of terrorism by citing the resistance against the Soviets in the 1980s. He disapproved of the Obama Administration's shunning of Hamid Karzai and believed Abdullah Abdullah was not an acceptable candidate to Afghanistan's diverse ethnic groups – namely, the Pashtuns and Uzbeks. He also called for a shift in U.S. strategy from the media theme against the Taliban to a more focused propaganda campaign against Al Qaeda. He voiced his urgency to the immediate resolution of the Durand Line between Pakistan and Afghanistan. He seemed to want Afghan people to handle their own problems and believed that the U.S. would continue to experience resistance as long as it stayed in Afghanistan.

=== Iran ===
On Iran, Prince Turki warned of its growing influence in Lebanon as "foreign hands manipulating strings." Asked what he thought would be the consequences of an Israeli or U.S. attack on Iran's nuclear facilities, Prince Turki responded, "Calamitous ... cataclysmic, not just catastrophic." On the Iranian nuclear program, he believes that there should be a zone free of weapons of mass destruction. He also believes Iranian actions have provoked worldwide opposition but at the same time suggests that Iran's nuclear program is being singled out. He believes Iran is pursuing an "explosive" path in nuclear enrichment. He stated if Iran was attacked, Saudi Arabia would never grant Israeli flyover rights.

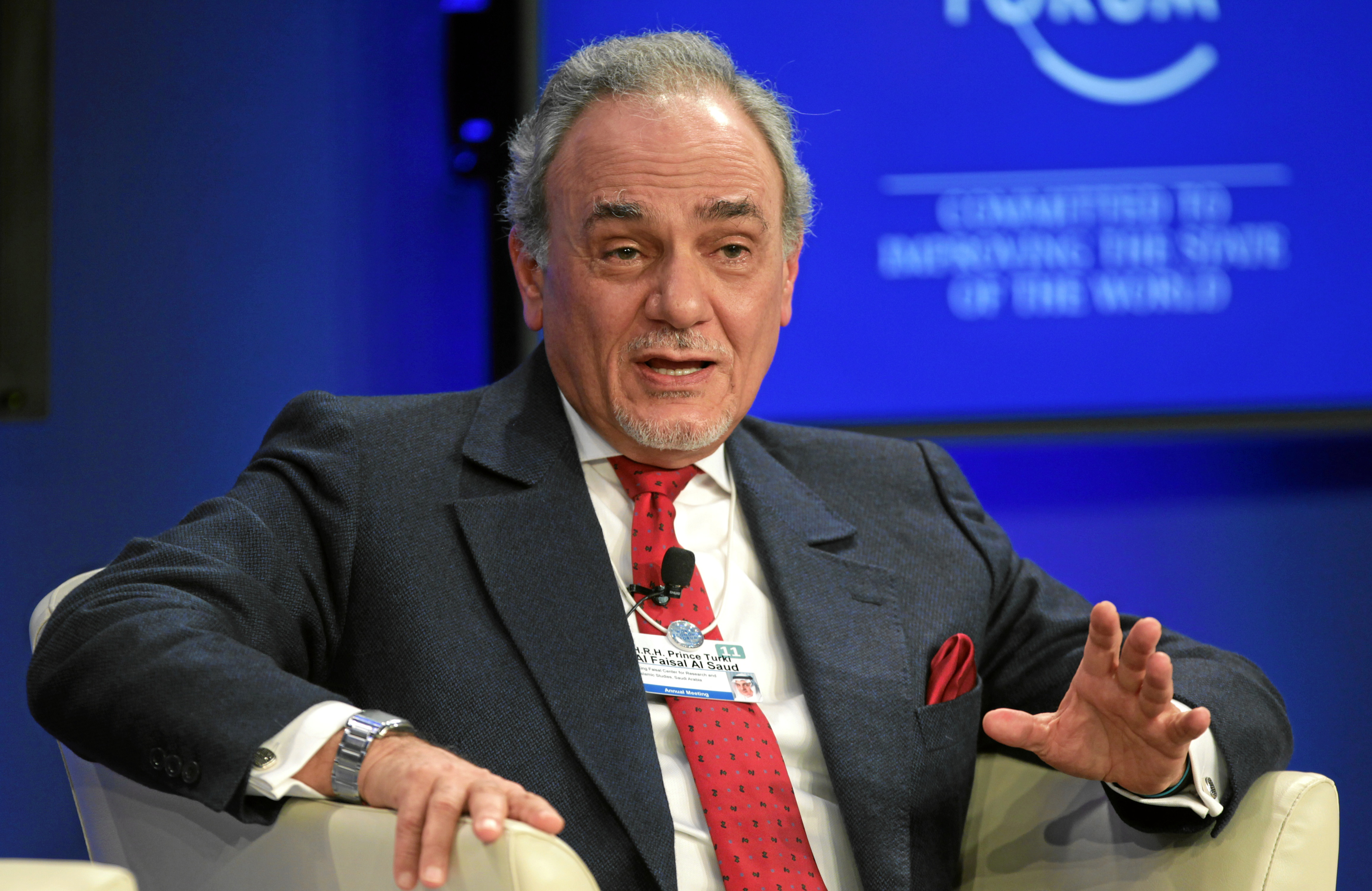
Prince Turki speaking at the 2011 World Economic Forum

He called the Geneva interim agreement a serious concern and condemned the United States for keeping the Government of Saudi Arabia away from the negotiations in Geneva.

In 2016, Prince Turki expressed support for the dissident group Mojahedin-e-Khalq (MEK/PMOI).

=== Yemen ===
Prince Turki stated that Yemen has become a sanctuary for extremists as refugees flee the conflict into the Kingdom's borders.

=== Israel and Palestine ===
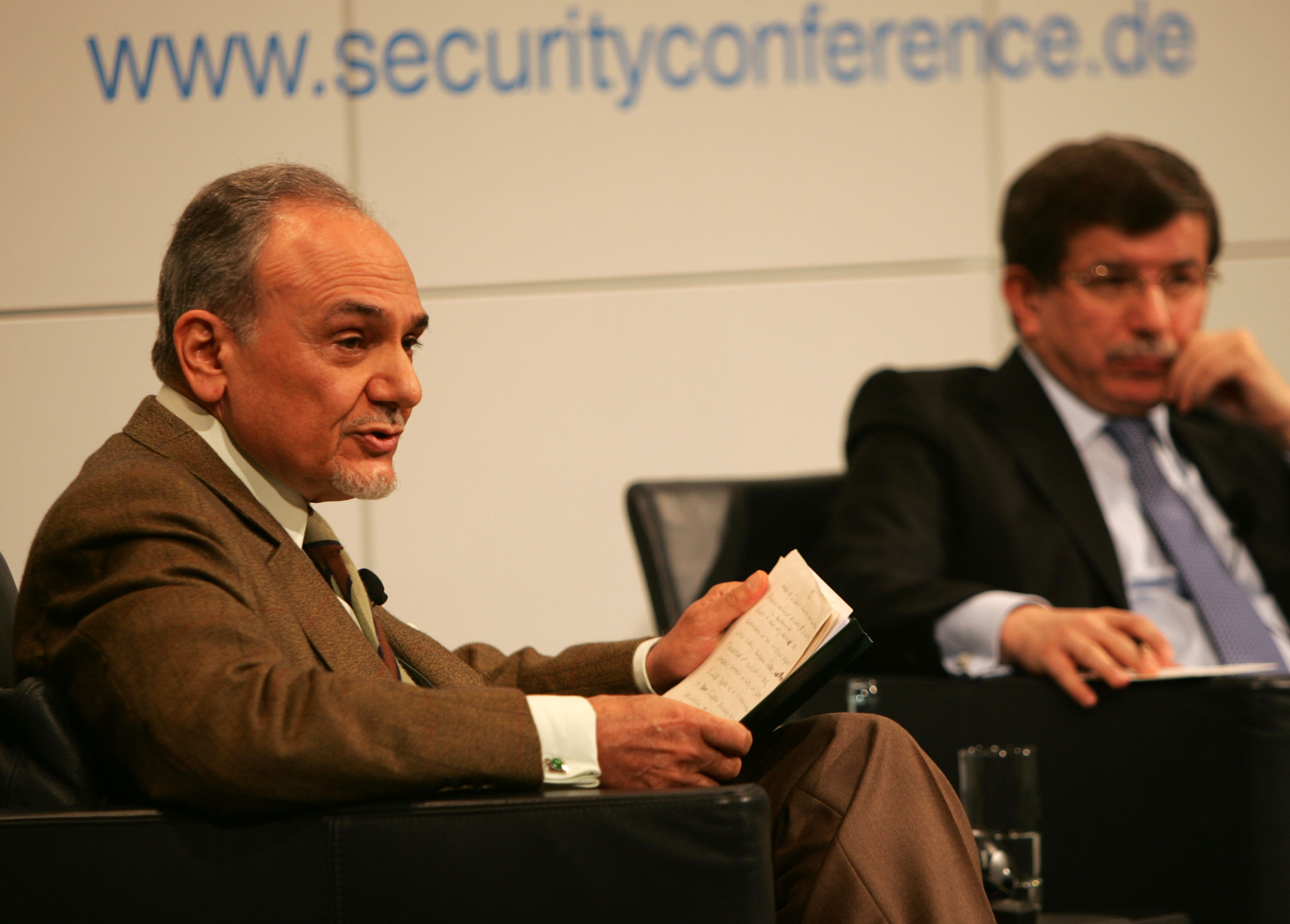
Prince Turki and Turkey's Foreign Minister Ahmet Davutoğlu at the Munich Security Conference, 2010

Prince Turki was the Kingdom's leading critic of American foreign policy. Prince Turki criticized Israel for not accepting the Arab Peace Initiative, which proposed normalizing relations in exchange for Israel's withdrawal to 1967 borders. He accused the Bush administration for undermining a Saudi-brokered power-sharing agreement between Fatah and Hamas and the Obama administration of pro-Israel bias and protecting Israel's nuclear program from international scrutiny. He called on U.S. President Barack Obama to support the two-state solution for Palestinians and Israelis.

In a Financial Times editorial in January 2009, he was critical of American foreign policy toward Palestinians and accused the U.S. of complicity in the deaths of Gazans. He opined that "neocon advisers, American conservatives and Zionist extremists promoted policies that harmed the peace process," describing both Democrats and Republicans as strong supporters of Israel.

At the Munich Security Conference in February 2010, he initially refused to sit next to Israeli Deputy Foreign Minister Danny Ayalon because of Ayalon's "boorish" behavior toward the Turkish ambassador on Israeli television. In response to Ayalon's comment that Saudi Arabia had not "given a penny" to the Palestinian Authority, Prince Turki claimed that it had given more than $500 million over the past five years. Ayalon apologized and shook hands with Prince Turki as a reconciliation measure. The crowd applauded. Turki clarified that this gesture did not signal any change in official policy towards Israel.

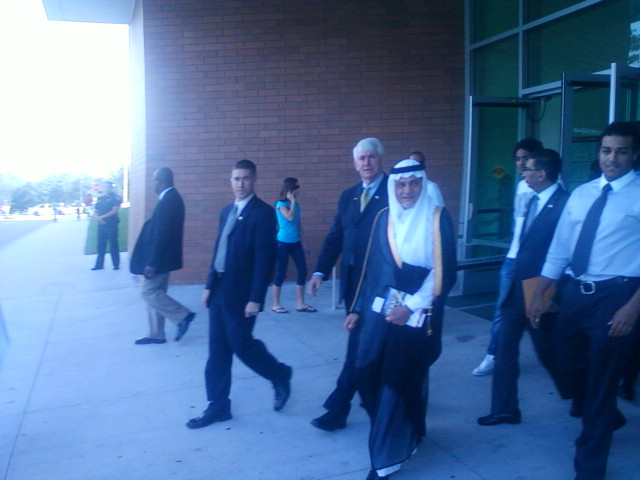
Prince Turki leaves the University of South Florida after delivering a brief lecture on Saudi Arabian history.

In the World Economic Forum at Davos in January 2011, he called for a Middle East without WMDs and stated "the elephant in the room is Israel. Israel with a nuclear weapon is dangerous."

After attending the Munich Security Conference in January 2014, Faisal praised Israel's justice minister, Tzipi Livni, and said he understood why she was chosen as Israel's negotiator.

On 21 August 2020, in an apparent response to President Donald Trump, who said he expected Saudi Arabia to join the peace agreement between Israel and the United Arab Emirates (UAE), Prince Turki wrote that the price for normalizing relations with Israel is the creation of a sovereign Palestinian state with Jerusalem as its capital. He added that any Arab country that wants to follow the UAE's footsteps should demand a higher price for peace from Israel in the future.

In the context of a broader shift of Saudi messaging about Palestine, after Israel's war on Gaza following the Hamas-led attack on 7 October 2023, Turki bin Faisal offered to Arab audiences a favorable analysis of the long-term goals that the attack supposedly achieved. He expressed these views in an interview to the Saudi TV channel Al Ekhbariya, which is funded by the state Saudi Broadcasting Authority, on 31 December 2023.

=== Wikileaks ===
Prince Turki claimed the documents "are a hodgepodge of selectivity, inaccuracy, agenda pursuit, and downright disinformation." He claimed if diplomats and leaders were not able to discuss matters that affect them through cables freely, the countries are "in trouble". He added that WikiLeaks poses a serious danger to all governments and called for meting out tough punishment for those responsible for the breach.

=== Domestic affairs ===
Around 2003, Prince Turki said that "reforming the Kingdom is not a choice, it is a necessity". In late March 2011, he argued that elections for membership to the Saudi Shoura Council (the national majlis) should be realized and warned of a "failure in the Kingdom's job market".

=== Assassination of Jamal Khashoggi ===
Prince Turki dismissed the CIA's finding that Jamal Khashoggi's murder was ordered directly by Saudi Crown Prince Mohammed bin Salman, saying that "The CIA has been proved wrong before. Just to mention the invasion of Iraq for example. The CIA is not necessarily the best measure of creditable intelligence reporting or intelligence assessment."

== Controversy ==
Prince Turki has been linked to several large fund transfers to former Malaysian Prime Minister Najib Razak, who is on trial in Malaysia for various offences in the multi-billion dollar 1Malaysia Development Berhad scandal. In the 1990s, residents of Cambridge, Massachusetts, complained that the Prince and his entourage ejected members of the public from a city park and drove a limousine onto public playing fields. He also appears on the leaked list of attendees of Peter Thiel's Dialog group meeting outside Dublin, Ireland this Fall.

== Various positions ==
Prince Turki bin Faisal is a commissioner in the International Commission on Nuclear Non-Proliferation and Disarmament. He is deputy chairman of Saudi General Authority for Civil Aviation (GACA). He is also vice president of general authority of civil aviation for international organizations and was elected as first vice president of the regional bureau of Asia-Pacific within airports council international.

He taught at Georgetown University School of Foreign Service. He is also a co-chair of the C100 Group, an affiliate of the World Economic Forum. C-100 Group encourages interfaith dialogue and cross-cultural understanding.

He visited many American universities and has lectured on the history of Saudi Arabia to improve relations between the West and Saudi Arabia. He also visited the University of South Florida, Syracuse University, Rice University, Cornell University, and Harvard University. In November 2010, he spoke at the Carnegie Endowment for International Peace.

Prince Turki acted as one of the top speakers of the Kingdom.

== Personal life ==
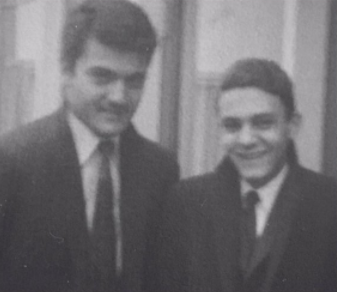
Prince Turki with his brother Prince Saud in the early 1960s.

Prince Turki is married to Nouf bint Fahd bin Khalid Al Saud, with whom he has six children: Faisal, Mashael, Noura, Abdulaziz, Saud, and Mudhi. His son Prince Abdulaziz won the second round of the Porsche Middle East Cup. His daughter Princess Noura is assistant to vice chairman of the board of trustees and general supervisor of Effat University and Dar Al Hanan School. At a University of South Florida event, he mentioned he has grandchildren and they sometimes ask him questions about Islam.

In person, Prince Turki has been described as the antithesis of Bandar bin Sultan. Prince Turki has been described as cool-headed, soft-spoken, and avuncular. He is often portrayed as one of the most educated Saudi princes.

=== Health ===
Prince Turki has problems resulting from the carbon-monoxide poisoning he suffered when he stayed in a camper van on a desert trip in the mid-1980s.

=== Awards ===
Prince Turki is the recipient of the Crans Montana Forum medal. He also received an honorary doctorate in law from the University of Ulster in Northern Ireland in 2010 and an honorary doctorate in Middle Eastern studies from Shanghai International Studies University (SISU) in China in 2015. He also received one of Afghanistan's highest honor, the Ghazi Mir Bacha Khan Medal.

== Publications ==
Prince Turki has published articles in various media outlets, including the one entitled How to End Syria's Horror dated 2013. He is the author of a book entitled The Afghanistan File dated 2021.

Preceded by Kamal Adham	Director of General Intelligence Presidency; 1979–2001	Succeeded by Nawwaf bin Abdulaziz Al Saud
