= Abdul Rahman bin Faisal Al Saud =

Abdul Rahman bin Faisal Al Saud may refer to:

- Abdul Rahman bin Faisal Al Saud (1850–1928), last Emir of Nejd, now part of Saudi Arabia
- Abdul Rahman bin Faisal Al Saud (1942–2014), Saudi prince
