= Iffat bint Mohammad Al Thunayan =

Saudi royal, education activist and wife of King Faisal (1916–2000)

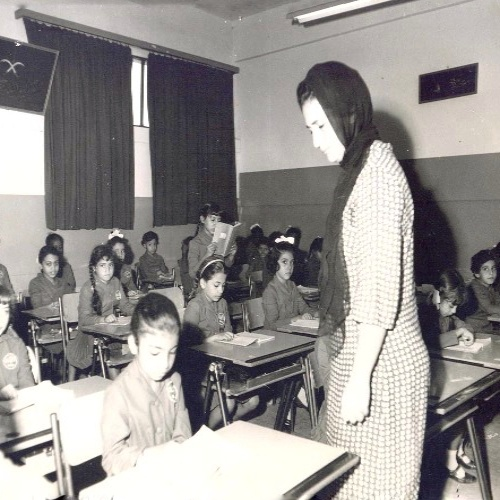
- The Queen visiting Dar Al Hannan School
- Born: Emire İffet; 1916; Istanbul, Ottoman Empire
- Died: 17 February 2000 (aged 84); Riyadh, Saudi Arabia
- Spouse: Faisal of Saudi Arabia (m. 1932; died 1975)
- Issue: List: Princess Sara Prince Mohammad Princess Latifa Prince Saud Prince Abdul Rahman Prince Bandar Prince Turki Princess Lolowah Princess Haifa
Names
- Iffat bint Mohammad bin Abdullah bin Abdullah bin Thunayan
- House: Al Saud
- Father: Mohammad bin Abdullah Al Thunayan
- Mother: Asia Hanım

Styles of Queen Iffat
- Reference style: Her Majesty
- Spoken style: Your Majesty

Iffat bint Mohammad Al Thunayan (Arabic: عفت بنت محمد الثنيان ʿIffat bint Moḥammad Āl Ṯunayān, Turkish: Muhammed Es-Süneyyan kızı İffet or Turkish: Emire İffet; 1916 – 17 February 2000) was a Turkish-born education activist and Saudi princess who was the most prominent wife of King Faisal of Saudi Arabia. She is sometimes called Queen Iffat (Arabic: الملكة عفت Al-Malika ʿIffat) or Princess Iffat (Arabic: الأميرة عفت Al-Emira ʿIffat). She is known for her efforts in the improvement of Saudi education. She was the founder of Taif model school and the first girl's college in Saudi Arabia.

== Early life and education ==
Iffat was part of the Al Thunayan cadet branch of the Al Saud. She was born in Istanbul in 1916.

Iffat's paternal grandfather was Abdullah bin Abdullah bin Thunayan Al Saud. He was born in 1843 on the day his father Abdullah bin Thunayan, Emir of Nejd, died. Due to this coincidence he was named after his father. He left Nejd for Istanbul where he married a Circassian-origin Turkish woman, Tazeruh Hanım. They had four children: Mohammad, Ahmed, Suleiman, and Jawhara. Mohammad bin Abdullah Al Thunayan, Iffat's father, was a physician in the Ottoman army and her mother, Asia, was a Turkish woman. Mohammad was killed while fighting in the Balkan War. Iffat had a full-brother, Zaki, and two maternal half-brothers, Kamal and Mozaffar Adham. Her paternal uncle, Ahmed bin Abdullah, was one of the advisors to King Abdulaziz.

Following the marriage of her mother to another man, Iffat and her aunt Jawhara lived together, and Iffat was educated in Istanbul. She went to school wearing shoes stuffed with paper instead of soles. She attended both Ottoman schools and modern schools following the establishment of the Republic of Turkey. Finally, she attained a teaching degree. In 1925, Iffat's family asked for financial assistance for a Makkah pilgrimage for Iffat.

One of Iffat's relatives, Laila Al Thunayan, was married to Sultan bin Abdulaziz Al Saud.

== Marriage with Faisal ==
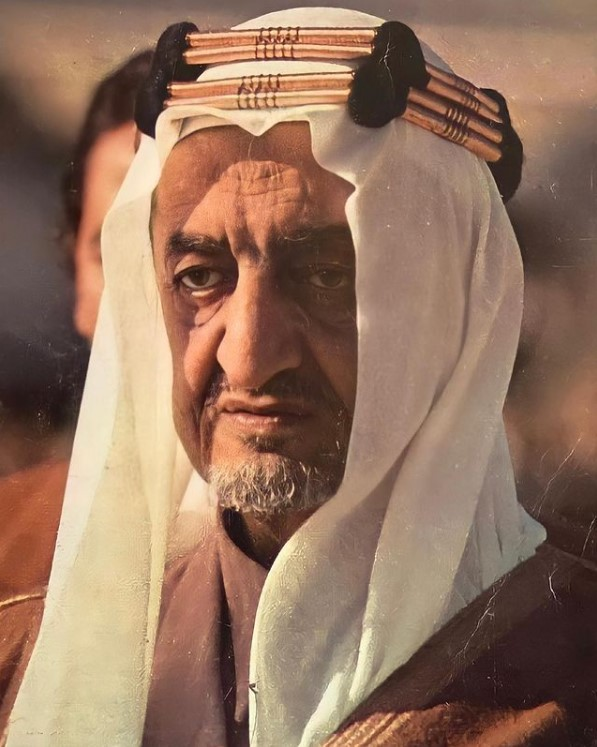
King Faisal, Iffat's husband

In 1931, Prince Faisal met Iffat for the first time while she was undertaking a Makkah pilgrimage with her aunt. Prince Faisal, who served as viceroy of the Hijaz, took Iffat back to Turkey with her aunt. However, there is another report about their meeting for the first time, stating that they first met in Istanbul in 1932 when Prince Faisal visited the city following an official visit to the Soviet Union. It follows that he and Iffat went to Jeddah together after this incident. They married in Jeddah in 1932 and lived in Mecca.

As neither spoke the other's language, they taught each other. They had nine children – five sons and four daughters: Mohammad, Bandar, Saud, Turki, Abdul Rahman, Lolowah, Sarah, Latifa and Haifa. Four of their children learned Turkish at home. Iffat became a fluent Arabic-speaker, but never lost her Turkish accent.

Their sons are very educated and are alumni of Princeton, Harvard, Georgetown, Sandhurst, and Cranwell. She contacted foreign tutors to educate her daughters. In stark contrast, only six of the 107 children of Faisal's older half-brother Saud even completed high school.

== Queen Iffat ==
Queen Iffat was an informal title given to her because of her beloved status in Saudi Arabia.

In 1967, Iffat began making public appearances at state events. She became honorary president of the "Saudi Arabian Renaissance Society" — a woman's society in Riyadh to teach women skills in crafts, and to assist needy families — in the organization's fifth anniversary. Her "Saudi Renaissance Movement" sponsored free clinics and literary classes for women.

Her comprehensive philanthropic activities included social welfare for women. During the 1960s, she established the first two social agencies in Saudi Arabia — Women's Welfare Association in Jeddah and Al Nahdah Women's Welfare Association in Riyadh. These programs are still available today.

=== Saudi education ===
In 1942–1943, Prince Faisal and Princess Iffat established the boarding school named Al Madrasa Al Numuthagiya (The Model School) for boys and girls. Many children of the extended royal family, including their own, attended. A majority of the teachers were Egyptian or Yemenis, and the girls' section was strictly for daughters of the extended royal family.

In 1955, Iffat initiated Saudi Arabia's first private school for women in Jeddah — the Dar Al Hanan (literally "House of Affection"). One of her younger daughters attended Dar Al Hanan. Its starting class had 15 students. In 1956, she donated money and land to build an orphanage for girls where they would also be educated. She also founded the first college for girls in Riyadh, called Kulliyat ul Banat or the Girls’ College, in 1960.

In 1967, Iffat launched the Nahdah Al Saudiyyah, an organization that educated illiterate Riyadh women. In the 1970s, Iffat started the country's first community college for women.

In August 1999, Iffat established Effat University adjacent to Dar Al Hanan just months before her death. Effat University is Saudi Arabia's first private, non-profit women's college.

Iffat frequented many graduation ceremonies. Her motto was "Educate yourself. Be good mothers. Bring up perfect Saudis. Build your country." Her other motto was "The mother can be a school in herself if you prepare her well".

== Personal life ==
Iffat was dark-haired with bright eyes. She liked to garden roses. She was a fluent French speaker and enjoyed reading. She was said to be remarkably well-organized. Iffat cared for her aunt Jawhara when the latter was incapacitated in Istanbul.

Iffat appeared at many state functions and received female dignitaries. She traveled across Saudi Arabia. Her palace had an open-door policy that allowed any Saudi citizen to visit her. She was rarely ever photographed in public and she never appeared on television.

In August 1993 Iffat underwent surgery due to bowel ailment at medical center of Duke University.

== Death and legacy ==
On 17 February 2000, Iffat Al Thunayan died after an unsuccessful operation. She was buried in Riyadh after Friday prayers.

Legacy

The Princess Iffat Al Thunayan Prize recognizes accomplishments of women. In 2014 Joseph A. Kéchichian published a book entitled Iffat Al Thunayan: An Arab Queen.
