= Seeta bint Fahd Al Damir =

Spouse of King Khalid of Saudi Arabia (1922–2012)

- Born: 25 June 1922
- Died: 25 December 2012 (aged 90); Riyadh, Saudi Arabia
- Spouse: Khalid of Saudi Arabia
- Issue: List: Princess Jawhara; Princess Nouf; Princess Moudi; Princess Hussa; Princess Al Bandari; Princess Meshael; Prince Faisal
- House: Al Saud (by marriage)
- Father: Fahd bin Mohammed Al Damer
- Mother: Rifaa Shehitan Al Dhaen Al Ajami

Seeta bint Fahd Al Damer (Arabic: صيتة بنت فهد الدامر; 25 June 1922 – 25 December 2012) was one of the spouses of King Khalid of Saudi Arabia.

== Early life ==
Seeta was a member of the Ajman tribe based in Al Badiyah and a niece of Wasmiyah Al Damir, wife of Abdullah bin Jiluwi. Her parents were Fahd bin Abdullah Al Damir and Raisa Shehitan Al Dhaen Al Ajami. She had two brothers and five sisters. Her brother, Abdullah bin Fahd, was the leader of the Juda settlement of the Ajman tribe.

== Personal life ==
From Seeta's marriage with Khalid, the couple had seven children: Jawhara, Nouf, Moudi, Hussa, Al Bandari, Mishaal and Faisal. Her daughter, Moudi bint Khalid, was a member of the Consultative Assembly between 2013 and 2016.

== Death ==
Seeta bint Fahd died in Riyadh on 25 December 2012. The funeral ceremony was held after Asr prayer led by Abdulaziz Al Asheikh at Imam Turki bin Abdullah Mosque in Riyadh on 26 December 2012 with the attendance of senior Saudi officials, including then Crown Prince Salman bin Abdulaziz.
