= Faisal bin Turki Al Saud (born 1975) =

Saudi prince (born 1975)

- Born: 27 April 1975 (age 51)
Names
- Faisal bin Turki bin Faisal bin Abdulaziz bin Abdul Rahman bin Faisal Al Saud
- House: Al Saud
- Father: Turki bin Faisal Al Saud
- Mother: Nouf bint Fahd Al Saud
- Religion: Islam

Faisal bin Turki Al Saud (Arabic: فيصل بن تركي آل سعود; born 27 March 1975) is a member of the Saudi royal family. He is the eldest son of Prince Turki bin Faisal Al Saud and brother of Red Bull athlete Prince Abdulaziz. Similar to his father, Prince Faisal bin Turki studied International Relations at the Edmund A. Walsh School of Foreign Service at Georgetown University. Faisal also studied at Calvin College, American Intercontinental University and the London School of Economics and Political Science, obtaining an MSc in Environmental Policy Planning and Regulation.

== Global Strategic Studies Institute ==
In 2007, Faisal founded the Global Strategic Studies Institute (GSSI) which is the first Saudi Arabian environmental NGO. The GSSI supports new mega projects, encouraging their development to have an environmentally friendly focus, through environment policy and directive guidelines. GSSI has commenced establishing a think tank that will be at the forefront of the implementation of renewable energy in the Middle East.

One of the GSSI's current projects is to build the first Saudi Arabian solar farm and factory on a 5-square-mile (13 km^{2}) plot outside of Riyadh. This project will be twice the size of the Masdar Environmental City being built in Abu Dhabi.

Faisal's concern for the environment was borne from both extensive academic research and a greater understanding of the importance of Saudi Arabia in the future of renewable energy.

GSSI has worked closely with First Energy Bank, the world's first bank dedicated to alternative energy. In 2007, First Energy Bank sponsored the yacht of Faisal Bin Turki Al Faisal at the International Union for Conservation of Nature's Sailing to Barcelona Initiative.

In November 2008 Faisal was invited as a guest of honour to attend the Global Summit for Ecology in Tokyo, Japan where both Al Gore and Michael Nobel Nobel Foundation were present as guest speakers. In 2008 GSSI also formed a strategic partnership with World Environment TV, a leading environmental broadcaster and is partnership with Dr Tom Kelly OBE CEO of the Stakeholder Group, a leading UK based Public Relations company.

He was the political attaché to the Saudi Embassy in the USA during the period when Bandar bin Sultan was ambassador.

== Environmental positions ==
Faisal bin Turki is the Director of Project Aware in association with PADI and the Saudi Arabian National Commission for Wild Life and Conservation. In 1999, Faisal founded Blue Reef Divers which currently has three scuba diving schools across the Kingdom and runs a series of coastal conservation projects.

Faisal bin Turki is also the co-founder of F&F Law Firm and F&F Public Relations, which has since formed a partnership with the Stakeholder Group.
