= Kamal Adham =

Turkish-origin Saudi government official and businessman (1929–1999)

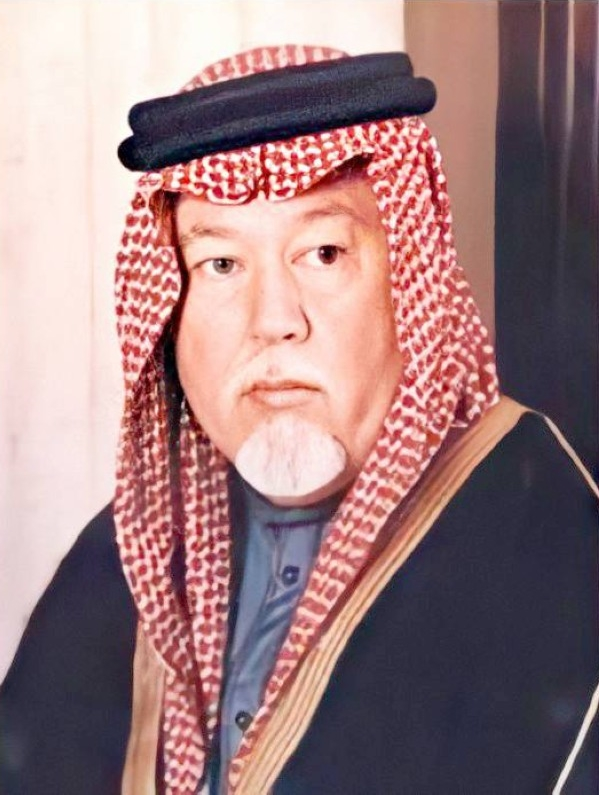

Director General of Al Mukhabarat Al A'amah
- In office 1965–1979
- Monarchs: King Faisal; King Khalid
- Succeeded by: Turki Al Faisal

Personal details
- Born: Kamal Ibrahim Adham; 1929 Istanbul, Turkey
- Died: 29 October 1999 (aged 69–70) Cairo, Egypt
- Spouse: Nadia Adham
- Children: 4
- Parents: Ibrahim Adham (father); Asia Adham (mother)
- Education: Victoria College; Cambridge University
- Awards: Knight Commander of the Order of St Michael and St George

Kamal Adham (Arabic: كمال ابراهيم ادهم; 1929 – 29 October 1999) was a Saudi businessman and the director general of Al Mukhabarat Al A'amah from 1965 to 1979. He served as a royal counsellor to both King Faisal and King Khalid.

== Early life and education ==
Kamal Adham was born in Istanbul in 1929. His father, Ibrahim Adham, was a police officer of Albanian origin. His mother, Asia, was Turkish. Adham had two half-siblings, Iffat bint Mohammad and Zaki bin Mohammad Al Thunayan, and a full-brother, Muzaffar.

Adham went to Jeddah with his father when he was one year old. He was raised by King Faisal, spouse of his sister Iffat.

Adham studied at Victoria College in Alexandria and then at Trinity College, Cambridge.

== Career ==
Kamal Adham joined the Saudi government as the chief of external intelligence agency in 1964. King Faisal appointed him as head of Al Mukhabarat Al A'amah (later renamed General Intelligence Presidency (GIP)) in 1965, making him the first president of the agency. Adham's tenure lasted for fourteen years until 19 January 1979 when he was dismissed and replaced by Turki bin Faisal in the post. Therefore, he also served as the head of the GIP during King Khalid's term.

Adham served as royal counsellor to King Faisal and then, to King Khalid. Adham was among the close advisors to King Khalid from 1975 to 19 January 1979.

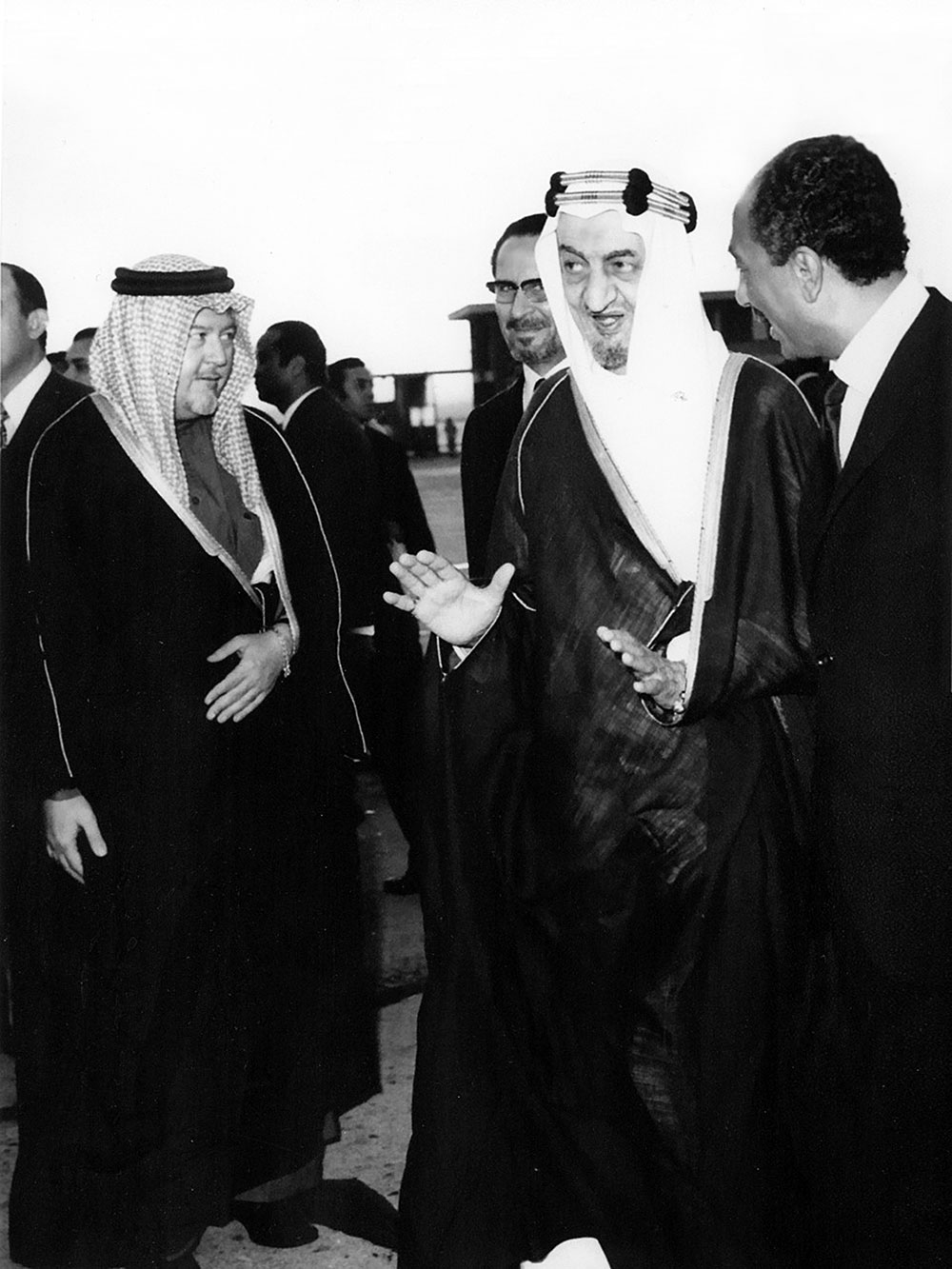
King Faisal with Anwar Sadat and Kamal Adham in Cairo in the early 1970s

=== Activities as the GIP head ===
Adham was very crucial in improving Saudi Arabia's relations with the United Kingdom which had become tense after the Buraimi oasis affair in 1955. He had also significant effects in maintaining the relations with Egypt. CIA financially supported Anwar Sadat, then vice president of Gamal Nasser, through Adham when Sadat had financial problems. Adham was sent by King Faisal to meet Sadat in May 1971, shortly after he was sworn in as president. Adham tried to persuade him to cooperate with the US. In the meeting, Sadat stated that after the completion of the Israeli withdrawal from Egypt, he would expel the Soviet forces from Egypt. He also assured that Adham could transmit his message to the US administration. As a result of Adham's visit, Sadat expelled 22,000 Soviet military advisors from the country in 1972. Adham told his associates in 1972 that the Shah of Iran, Mohammad Reza Pahlavi, would be removed. His prediction was not taken into consideration or shared by advisors of the US president Nixon.

Adham acted as a liaison between the GIP, which reported to the king, and the US administration. Additionally he was the primary liaison of the CIA for the Middle East as a whole from the mid-1960s to 1979 when he left the GIP. He fostered and maintained nascent ties with several Arab intelligence services, as many were slowly creating independent institutions to serve their respective governments. Adham closely worked with George H. W. Bush, who was appointed CIA director in 1976.

Adham signed the charter of the Safari Club, an anti-communist foreign policy initiative on behalf of Saudi Arabia that was proposed and realized by French intelligence chief Alexandre de Marenches in 1976. The other participating countries of the Club were Egypt, Iran and Morocco. The first meeting of the group was held in Saudi Arabia in 1976. Adham became a significant figure in the Club and worked for it for a long time.

=== Business activities ===
Adham also had business activities, for which he used his connections with the House of Saud. His business dealings began in 1957, long before his post as the head of the GIP.

He founded the Kamal Adham Group in Saudi Arabia, which became one of the biggest companies in the country. Raymond Close, a former CIA station chief in Saudi Arabia, left CIA and began to work for Adham in 1977 when he was the head of the GIP. Adham was also one of the major shareholders of the Bank of Credit and Commerce International (BCCI). In 1972, he met the founder of the BCCI, Agha Hasan Abedi. The same year Adham founded a contracting firm, Almabani, in Saudi Arabia.

He was one of the early shareholders of the influential media company, Saudi Research and Marketing. In addition, he had investments in Egypt, owning 4% of Delta Bank. He also became a business associate of Anwar Sadat's spouse, Jihan Sadat, and other members of the Sadat family. In 1978, Adham founded a construction company, Freyssinet, in Saudi Arabia. Adham along with Adnan Khashoggi was one of the founders of the gold company, Barrick Gold Corporation that was established in 1983.

In 2001, his son Mishaal was named as the chairman of the Kamal Adham Group.

=== Controversy ===
In 1961 Saudi oil minister Abdullah Tariki claimed on evidence that Adham, who was dealing with business at that time, got 2% of the profits from the Arabian Oil Company that had been cofounded by Saudi Arabia and Japan. On 23 January 1962 the ministry reported that the secret agreement between Adham and the Arabian Oil Company had been cancelled. As a result of this clash Tariki was removed from the office in March 1962.

Adham involved in the huge BCCI scandal at the beginning of the 1990s. The US prosecutors accused him of playing a key role in the secret and illegal takeover of First American bank by BCCI. Adham agreed to pay a staggering amount of $105 million fine in return for a reduced sentence. As a result of this incident, Adham was barred from the finance sector.

== Personal life and death ==
Kamal Adham wed in 1957 and fathered four children, three sons and a daughter. His wife, Nadia, was from the Samaqiyya family of Syrian and Egyptian origins. One of Adham's mansions was in Marbella where other senior Saudi and Gulf royals have owned properties.

Kamal Adham died of a heart attack in Cairo on 29 October 1999. He was 71. His body was brought back to Saudi Arabia for burial.

Adham was fluent in four languages, namely Arabic, Turkish, English, and French.

== Awards and legacy ==
Adham was awarded the Knight Commander of the Order of St Michael and St George in 1967 when he was part of King Faisal's entourage in his state visit to the United Kingdom.

The Kamal Adham Center for Television and Digital Journalism was founded under the American University in Cairo in 1985. The center was financially supported by Kamal Adham who was a member of Board of Trustees of the University.

== See also ==
- Adnan Khashoggi
