= Moudi bint Khalid Al Saud =

Saudi royal

- Died: 19 August 2024
- Spouse: Abdul Rahman bin Faisal Al Saud
- Issue: Princess Sara; Prince Saud; Princess Al Bandari
Names
- Moudi bint Khalid bin Abdulaziz bin Abdul Rahman Al Saud
- House: Al Saud
- Father: King Khalid
- Mother: Sita bint Fahd Al Damir

Moudi bint Khalid Al Saud (Arabic: موضي بنت خالد آل سعود) is a member of the Saudi ruling family, one of the grandchildren of Saudi's founder King Abdulaziz. She was among the first female members of the Consultative Assembly of Saudi Arabia who served in the post between January 2013 and December 2016.

== Early life and education ==
Princess Moudi is the daughter of King Khalid and Sita bint Fahd Al Damir. She received basic education in Riyadh and studied French.

== Career ==
Moudi is the general secretary of the King Khalid Foundation and the chair of its investment committee. She was also the general secretary of the Al Nahda Foundation of Riyadh. In 2009, the foundation was awarded the first Chaillot prize for human rights organisations in the Persian Gulf region. As of June 2023, she is the chair of the Al Nahda Foundation.

Moudi is a board member of the Saut, an agency of the down syndrome foundation in Saudi Arabia. In 2011, she began to provide fellowships under the Legatum Center to Saudi Arabian students attending Massachusetts Institute of Technology. She is one of the board members of Art of Heritage Organization.

In January 2013, Moudi was elected to the Consultative Assembly, being one of the first 30 Saudi Arabian women appointed to the assembly. She was one of the two royal women appointed to the Assembly along with Sara bint Faisal, daughter of King Faisal. Tenure of both royal women ended in December 2016 when King Salman appointed new members to the Assembly.

== Personal life ==
Princess Moudi married Abdul Rahman bin Faisal, son of King Faisal. Prince Abdul Rahman was a military officer in the Saudi Army. He died at age 73 in March 2014.

They had three children, two daughters, Sara and Al Bandari, and a son, Saud. Al Bandari bint Abdul Rahman who was the head of King Khalid Foundation and several other non-governmental organizations died in March 2019.
