= Sara bint Faisal Al Saud =

Saudi royal, philanthropist, and activist (born 1935)

- Born: 1935 (age 90–91)
- Spouse: Muhammed bin Saud Al Saud
Names
- Sara bint Faisal bin Abdulaziz bin Abdul Rahman Al Saud
- House: Al Saud
- Father: King Faisal
- Mother: Iffat Al Thunayan
- Education: Wellesley College

Sara bint Faisal Al Saud (Arabic: سارة بنت فيصل آل سعود Sara bint Fayṣal Āl Su'ūd; born 1935) is a member of the House of Saud, the Saudi royal family. She was among the first female members of the Consultative Assembly of Saudi Arabia who served in the post between January 2013 and December 2016.

== Early life and education ==
Sara bint Faisal is the eldest child of King Faisal and Iffat Al Thunayan who was of Turkish descent. She was born in 1935. Her full-siblings include Prince Mohammad, Princess Latifa, Prince Saud, Prince Abdul Rahman, Prince Bandar, Prince Turki, Princess Lolowah and Princess Haifa.

Sara bint Faisal learned Turkish language from her mother during her childhood. She graduated from Wellesley College.

== Career and activities ==
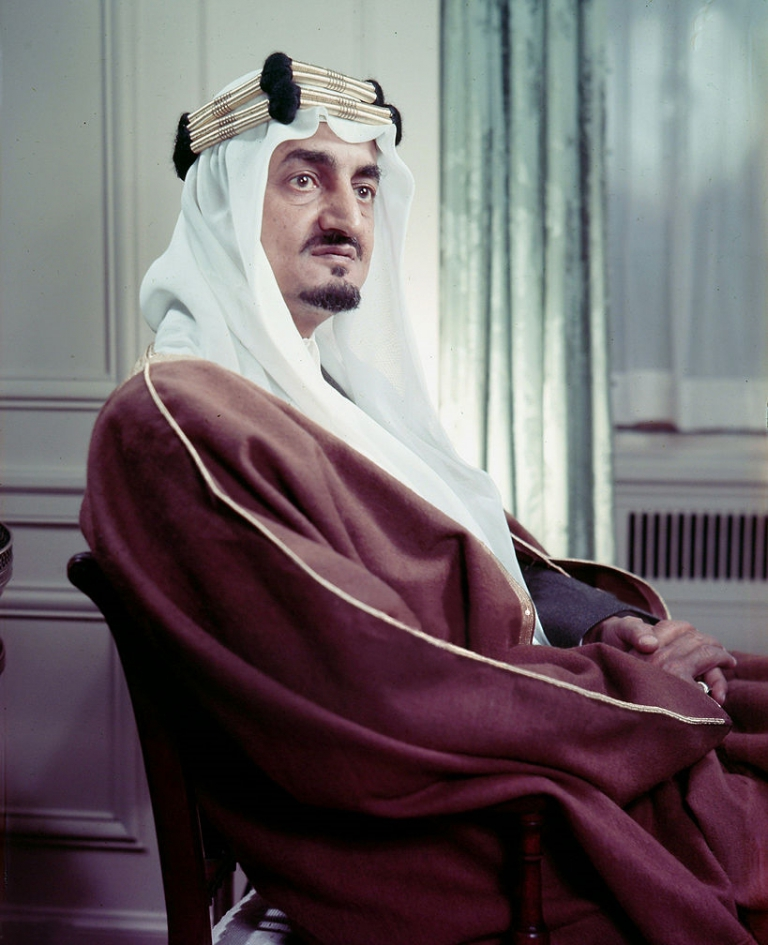
King Faisal, father of Sara

Princess Sara and her sister Princess Latifa established one of the first charitable organizations in Saudi Arabia, Al Nahda, in 1962. Princess Sara was the chair of the organization for a long time The organization was awarded the first Chaillot prize for human rights organizations in the Arab states of the Persian Gulf in 2009. She also established the private Al Tarbeya Al Islamiya Schools in Riyadh in 1964. She was replaced by Princess Moudi bint Khalid as chair of Al Nahda.

As of 2009 Princess Sara was the chair of Effat University's board of founders and board of trustees. She was also chair of Riyadh-based Art of Heritage organization. In addition, she served as member of the various organizations, including Maharat Center.

Princess Sara was named as a member of the Consultative Assembly on 11 January 2013. She was one of the first two royal women appointed to the assembly along with Princess Moudi bint Khalid. Tenure of both royal women ended in December 2016 when King Salman appointed new members to the assembly.

== Personal life ==
Sara bint Faisal is the widow of Mohammad bin Saud, son of King Saud. They had no children.

== Honors ==
In May 2013, Princess Sara was awarded King Abdulaziz Medal of First Class for her activities.
