= Khalid of Saudi Arabia =

King of Saudi Arabia from 1975 to 1982

Khalid
- His Majesty (HM)
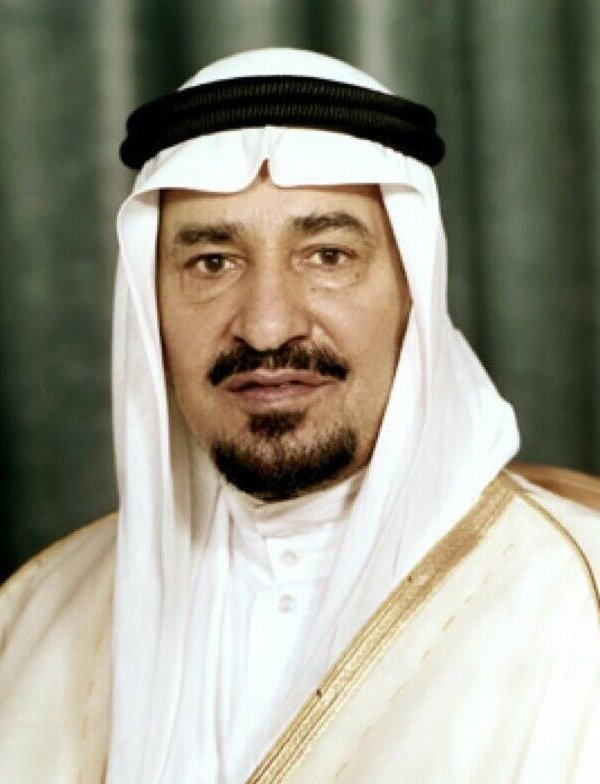
- Formal portrait, 1977

King and Prime Minister of Saudi Arabia
- Reign: 25 March 1975 – 13 June 1982
- Bay'ah: 25 March 1975
- Predecessor: Faisal
- Successor: Fahd

Crown Prince of Saudi Arabia First Deputy Prime Minister
- Tenure: 31 October 1962 – 25 March 1975
- Monarch: Saud; Faisal
- Regent: Crown Prince Faisal (1964)

Chairman of the Consultative Assembly
- Tenure: 25 March 1975 – 13 June 1982
- Predecessor: Faisal
- Successor: Fahd
- Born: 13 February 1913; Riyadh, Emirate of Riyadh
- Died: 13 June 1982 (aged 69); Taif, Saudi Arabia
- Burial: 13 June 1982; Al Oud cemetery, Riyadh
- Spouses: List: Latifa bint Ahmed Al Sudairi; Tarfa bint Abdullah Al Saud; Noura bint Turki Al Saud; Seeta bint Fahd Al Damir
- Issue: List: Prince Bandar; Prince Abdullah; Princess Al Bandari; Princess Al Jawhara; Prince Fahd; Princess Nouf; Princess Moudi; Princess Hussa; Prince Mishaal; Prince Faisal
Names
- Khalid bin Abdulaziz bin Abdulrahman
- House: Al Saud
- Father: King Abdulaziz
- Mother: Al-Jawhara bint Musaed

Khalid bin Abdulaziz Al Saud (Note: Arabic: خالد بن عبد العزيز آل سعود) (13 February 1913 – 13 June 1982) was King and Prime Minister of Saudi Arabia from 25 March 1975 until his death in 1982. Before his ascension, he was Crown Prince of Saudi Arabia. Khalid was the sixth son of King Abdulaziz, the founder of the Kingdom of Saudi Arabia.

Khalid was the son of King Abdulaziz and Al-Jawhara bint Musaed. He assisted his half-brother Prince Faisal in his duties as foreign minister of Saudi Arabia. Khalid served as viceroy of the Hejaz region for a brief time in the 1930s. He visited the United States in 1943 together with Faisal, establishing diplomatic relations between the two countries. He was appointed deputy prime minister of Saudi Arabia in 1962. King Faisal named Khalid as crown prince in 1965, after Khalid's full brother Prince Muhammad removed himself from the line of royal succession.

Following the assassination of King Faisal in 1975, Khalid ascended to the throne. His reign saw both huge developments in the country due to an increase in oil revenues and also significant events in the Middle East. In 1979, a group of civilians seized the Grand Mosque of Mecca and sought but failed to kidnap Khalid. Saudi forces regained control over the mosque, but the seizure resulted in the introduction of stricter religious policies in Saudi Arabia. Khalid died in 1982 and was succeeded by his half-brother Fahd.

== Early life and education ==
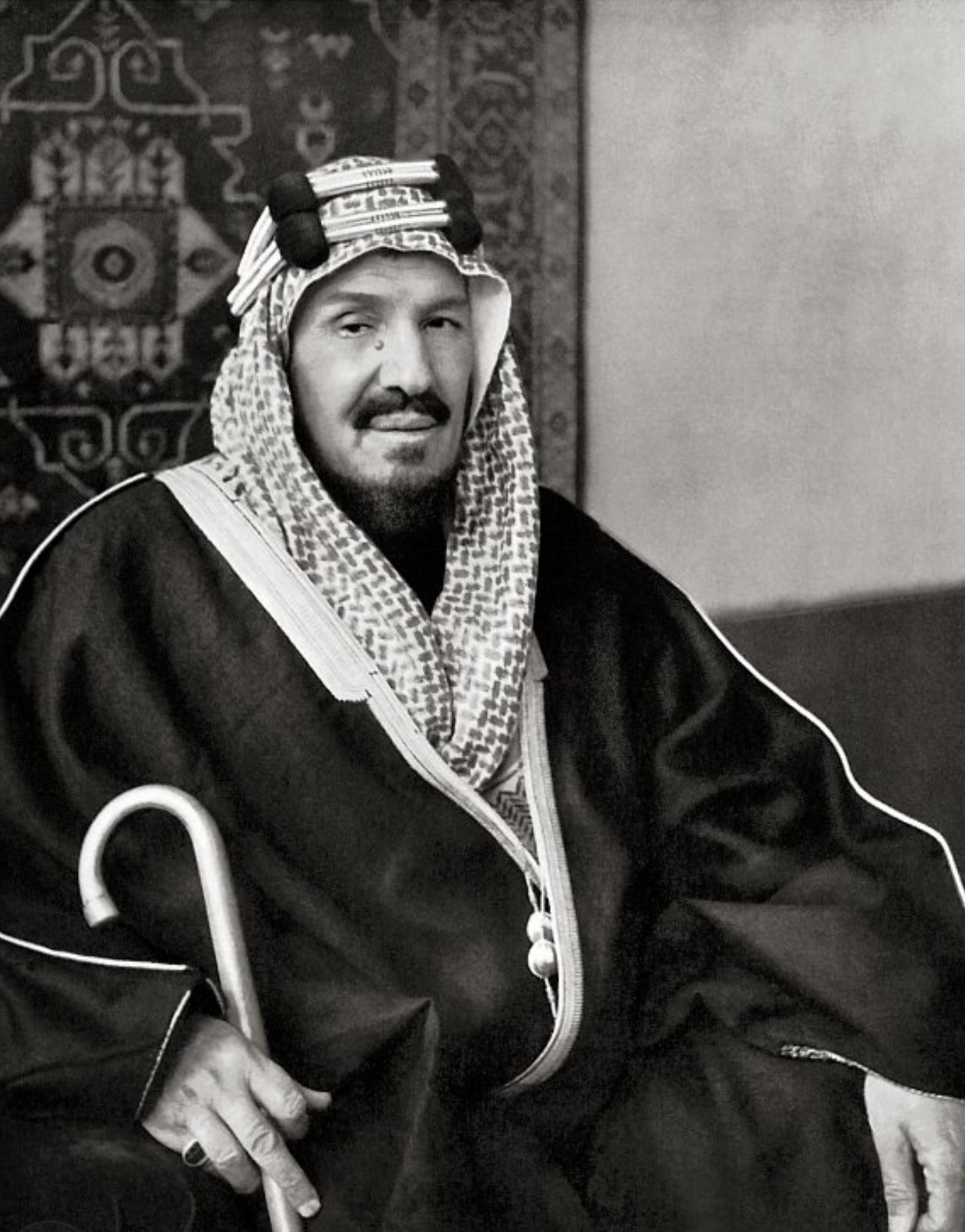
King Abdulaziz, father of Khalid

Khalid was born in Qasr Al Hukm, Riyadh, on 13 February 1913. His mother, Al Jawhara bint Musaed, was from the important Al Jiluwi clan. She was a second cousin of Abdulaziz, their paternal grandfathers Jiluwi bin Turki and Faisal bin Turki being brothers. This was in keeping with long-standing traditions in Arabia of marriage within the same lineage, and members of Al Jiluwi frequently intermarried with the members of Al Saud.

Khalid had one full-brother, Muhammad. His full sister, Al Anoud, married to the sons of King Abdulaziz's brother Sa'ad bin Abdul Rahman. She first married Saud bin Sa'ad. After Saud died, she married Fahd bin Sa'ad. Khalid attended the Mufirej school founded by Sheikh Abdul Rahman Al Mufirej in 1879 based in the Sheikh Abdullah bin Abdul Latif Mosque in the Dukhna neighborhood of Riyadh. There he acquired basic literacy skills and studied arithmetics.

== Early experience ==
Aged 14, Khalid was sent by Abdulaziz as his representative to the desert tribes to hear their concerns and problems. In 1928 he and his brother Muhammad were given the task of observing the Transjordan border during the Ikhwan revolt. Prince Khalid's preparation for ruling a modern state started through his visits with his brother Prince Faisal on foreign missions. He served as advisor to Faisal. Prince Khalid became an international figure due to his visits and service as a Saudi representative. He was more liberal in informing the press about the rationale behind foreign policy decisions.

Prince Khalid was made acting viceroy of Hejaz in early 1932 when his full brother Prince Muhammad carried out the task badly. The same year he was named as viceroy of Hejaz, replacing Prince Faisal in the post, who was named minister of foreign affairs, and Prince Khalid's term lasted until 1934. Prince Khalid joined the Saudi army led by his older brother Prince Faisal and fought against Yemeni forces in 1934. After the war, Prince Khalid served as the chairman of the Saudi delegation at the Taif Conference with Yemen in 1934. This was a diplomatic move that led to the Taif Treaty later that year which was signed by Prince Khalid on behalf of Saudi Arabia and Abdullah Al Wazeer on behalf of Yemen.

Prince Khalid was named interior minister in 1934 and was the Saudi representative at the peace negotiations in Yemen in 1935. In 1939, he participated in the St. James Conference on Palestine in London as the minister of interior as well as an assistant to Prince Faisal, head of the Saudi delegation.

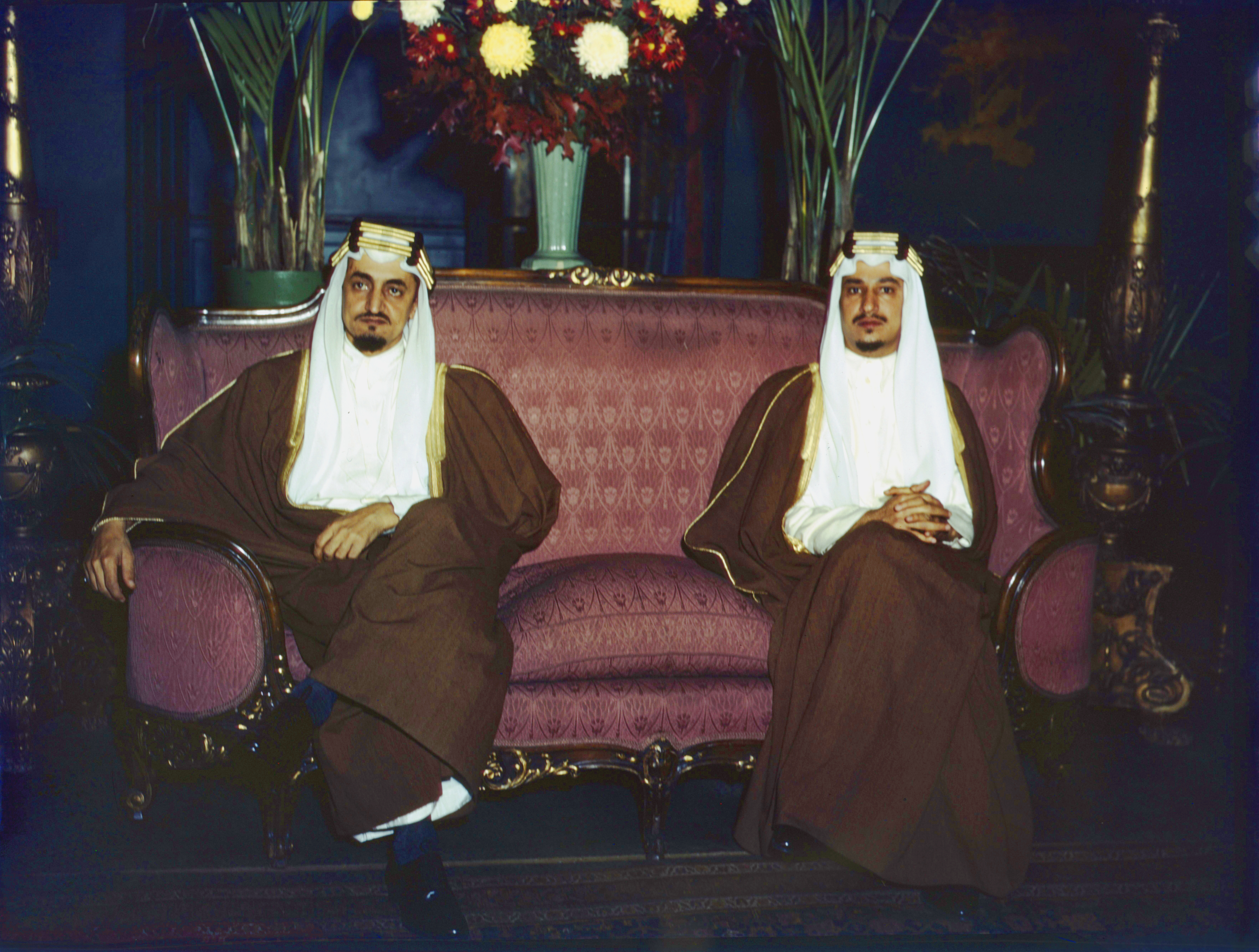
Prince Khalid (right) and Prince Faisal visiting the United States in 1943

In October 1943 Prince Faisal and Prince Khalid visited the United States representing their father, upon the July 1943 invitation of U.S. President Franklin D. Roosevelt. The visit was the earliest high-level contact between Saudi Arabia and the US. Vice President Henry A. Wallace organized a dinner for them at the White House. They also met with President Roosevelt. They stayed at the official government guest house, Blair House, and visited the West Coast by a special train that was officially provided by the U.S. government. A foreign diplomat described Prince Khalid following the visit as the "nicest man in Saudi Arabia."

However, after this visit and during most of the 1950s Prince Khalid did not play a significant role in the government partly due to the fact that his half-brother Mansour bin Abdulaziz and his nephew Abdullah bin Faisal became much more dominant political figures. Prince Khalid reemerged as a significant figure in 1960 when King Saud named him acting prime minister. In addition, on 31 October 1962 he was appointed deputy prime minister in the new cabinet formed by Crown Prince Faisal. This move indicated his prominence in the line of succession. During the rivalry between Crown Prince Faisal and King Saud, Prince Khalid supported the former together with other princes who were members of the Al Jiluwi branch of Al Saud through maternal lineage or marriage. The group was led by Prince Muhammad, Prince Khalid and Prince Abdullah.

At the beginning of King Faisal's reign Prince Khalid was made a member of the council which had been established by the king to guide the succession issues.

== Crown prince ==
Khalid's older full-brother Prince Muhammad declined a place in the succession. Khalid also refused the offer of King Faisal to be named as crown prince several times until March 1965. In addition, he asked King Faisal to remove him from the position various times. However, the King persuaded Khalid that his presence as crown prince was necessary to keep peace within the House of Saud. One of the speculations about Prince Khalid's selection as heir designate was his lack of predilection for politics. In short, by selecting him as heir designate the royal family could create intra-familial consensus.

Khalid was named crown prince on 29 March 1965. King Faisal announced Khalid's appointment on the same day through a broadcast over Mecca Radio:

Since the position of Crown Prince is a fundamental factor for the continuation and firmness of the reign, now the country enjoys stability, advancement and prosperity. Thanks to its adherence to Islam. It gives me great pleasure to announce...that I have chosen my brother Prince Khalid bin Abdulaziz as Crown Prince to rule after me.

Prince Khalid was also named first deputy prime minister following his appointment as crown prince. Although Joseph A. Kéchichian argues that Crown Prince Khalid was not active in daily issues, but acted as a representative during King Faisal's absences in meetings or ceremonies, he governed all organisational and executive powers of the Council of Ministers. He also dealt with the affairs of the Governorate of Mecca on behalf of King Faisal. However, in 1968 Crown Prince Khalid expressed his desire not to preside over the Council of Ministers against King Faisal's request which led to the appointment of Prince Fahd as second deputy prime minister with the task of leading the Council meetings.

In 1970 Crown Prince Khalid led Saudi delegations to Jordan to meet the needs of Palestinians who were seriously affected from Israel's attacks. According to the declassified US diplomatic documents of 1971, he enjoyed the support of the tribal chiefs, religious authorities and of Prince Abdullah, head of the Saudi National Guard, during this period.

== Reign ==
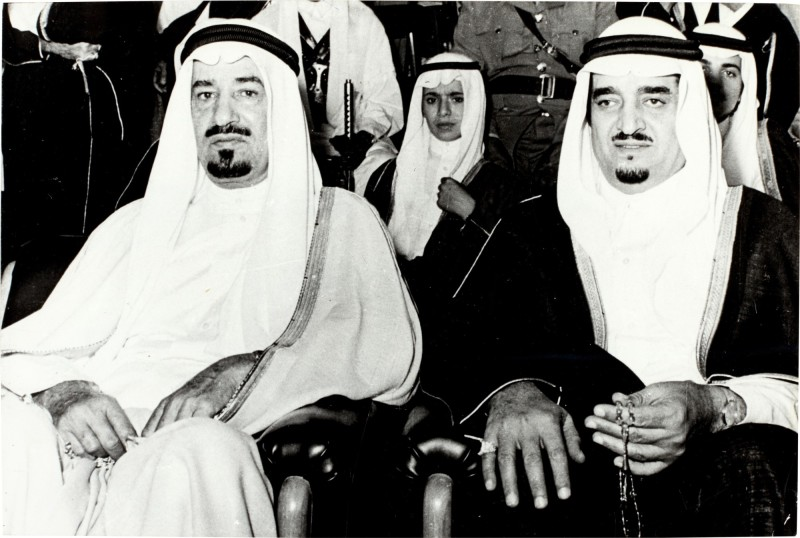
King Khalid and Crown Prince Fahd at a ceremony

Khalid succeeded to the throne on 25 March 1975 when King Faisal was assassinated. He was proclaimed king after a meeting of senior members of Al Saud: his uncle Abdullah bin Abdul Rahman and his brothers Muhammad, Nasser, Saad, Fahd, and Abdullah. The meeting occurred just hours after the assassination of King Faisal. Khalid also became the de facto prime minister of Saudi Arabia and the chairman of two significant councils, namely the Higher Council for Administrative Reform and the Supreme Council for National Security.

Although there are various reports stating that King Khalid was only a figurehead during his reign, he was in fact not a figurehead, but the final decision-maker on all major policy issues during his reign. King Faisal established a system in which the king was the final mediator in family problems. King Khalid reduced the power of the Sudairi Seven concerning succession in 1977 when he was in London for treatment. Following the unsuccessful attempt of the Sudairi Seven to overthrow King Khalid and to install one of their own, Prince Sultan, as deputy crown prince instead of Prince Abdullah, the King asked Crown Prince Fahd and Prince Abdullah to fully obey the existing succession plan without any change. King Khalid also closely checked the activities of Crown Prince Fahd due to the latter's clear support for the pro-Western policies and hostile tendency against Iran and Shia population of Saudi Arabia.

In addition, King Khalid was not an ineffective leader. Although he seemed to be reluctant to rule the country initially, he later warmed to the throne and displayed an apparent interest in improving the education, health-care and infrastructure of the country during his seven-year reign. During the first two years of his reign he was not active in politics due to his poor health condition, but later he became much more active as a result of his much better health.

King Khalid is also considered to have been a genial caretaker during his reign. However, he failed to monopolize power during his reign, leading to the empowerment of the princes who had been in powerful posts in late King Faisal's reign. He had some personal characteristics that made him a respected king. He was admired as an honest man who managed to have good relations with the traditional establishment of Saudi Arabia. Therefore, he was granted support by other princes and powerful forces of the country. Ghadah Alghunaim, a board member of the King Abdulaziz Center for National Dialogue, argues in her doctoral dissertation that Khalid's reign was a golden era and the "era of goodness" for the country.

=== Domestic affairs ===
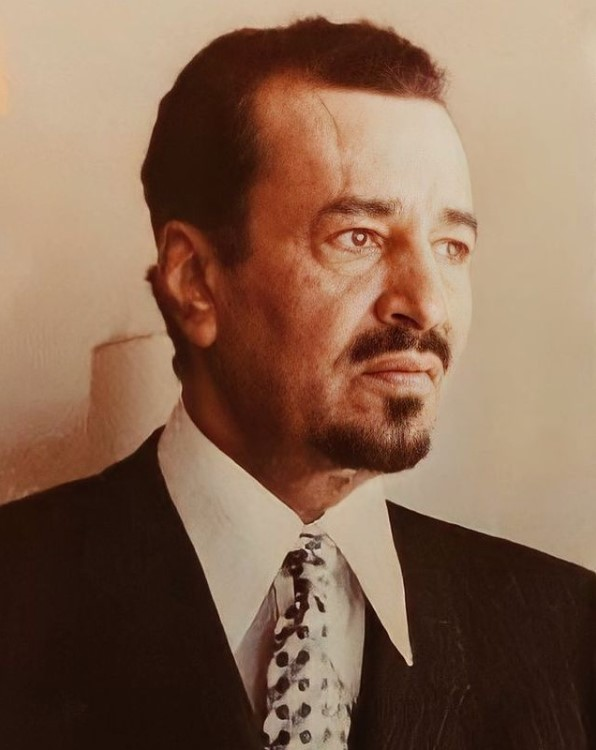
King Khalid in 1979

King Khalid's reign was of massive development in Saudi Arabia and therefore, the country became one of the richest countries in that the oil revenues became $40 billion in 1977 and $90 billion in 1980.

King Khalid primarily dealt with domestic affairs with special focus on agricultural development. The industrial cities of Jubail and Yanbu were created during the early days of his reign. In 1975 the Royal Commission for Jubail and Yanbu was founded to run the cities, and its first secretary general was Abdullah bin Faisal bin Turki. Jeddah Port Authority was established in September 1976 to expand the capacity of the existing port. The number of schools increased during his reign. In 1975, there were 3,028 elementary schools, 649 secondary schools and 182 high schools. In 1980, there were 5,373 elementary, 1,377 secondary and 456 high schools. The other significant development in the field of education during his reign was the establishment of King Faisal University. The others were the Higher Education Center for Women which was opened in 1976 as well as colleges of medicine and pharmacology established specifically for female students.

Immediately following his ascension to the throne King Khalid issued a general amnesty which allowed the release of political prisoners who had been members of the left wing movements and the return of those who had been in exile to Saudi Arabia. Most of them were arrested during the reign of King Faisal.

In terms of administrative functions King Khalid followed the structure established by King Faisal in which both royals and non-royals occupied significant positions. The political power consolidation of the ruling family was intensified during his reign. However, King Khalid expanded the role of nonroyals in bureaucracy without diminishing the roles of royal family members. These non-royals were mostly graduates of foreign universities, and by 1977 ten of the thirty-six members in the council of ministers were those who received a master's or doctorate degree from Western universities.

The strict financial policies of King Faisal, coupled with the aftermath of the 1973 oil crisis, created a financial windfall that fueled development and led to a commercial and economic boom in the country. Notable achievements in his reign included the institution of the second Five-Year Plan in 1975, which aimed to build up Saudi infrastructure and health care. The planned budget for the development plan was $142 billion. Although not all goals were achieved, the second development plan was much more successful than the first one. King Khalid also launched the Kingdom's third development plan with the budget of $250 billion in May 1980.

In a reorganization of the council of ministers on 30 March 1975, King Khalid named Crown Prince Fahd deputy prime minister and Prince Abdullah second deputy prime minister. Appointment of Prince Fahd as both crown prince and first deputy prime minister made him much powerful figure in contrast to the status of King Khaled when he was crown prince under King Faisal reign. Prince Nayef was named minister of interior succeeding Prince Fahd on 30 March 1975. King Khalid also appointed Prince Saud as the foreign affairs minister in March 1975.

In addition to the existing ministerial bodies six new ones were established by King Khalid in October 1975. One of them was the ministry of municipal and rural affairs established, and Prince Majid was appointed minister. Additionally, Prince Mutaib was appointed minister of public works and housing that was also established by King Khalid in October 1975. These two appointments were a move to reduce the power of Sudairi Seven in the cabinet. Besides, the ministry of industry and electricity, the ministry of higher education, the ministry of post, telegraph, and telephone and the ministry of planning were all founded by King Khalid. In the same government reshuffle he removed Prince Musaid, his uncle, from the post of finance minister which he had been held since 16 March 1962, and Mohammed bin Ali Aba Al Khail was made new finance minister. The number of non-royal members of the cabinet was decreased, and only eight royal family members were given ministerial posts in this reshuffle. King Khalid also expanded the internal structure of some ministries. For instance, the Public Security Administration was created in 1976 to preserve the public order and tranquility, to promote of the public health, safety, and morals, and to detect and punish the crimes, and attached it to the ministry of interior.

The members of the inner family council headed by King Khalid included his brothers, namely Prince Mohammad, Crown Prince Fahd, Prince Abdullah, Prince Sultan, and Prince Abdul Muhsin and two of his uncles, Prince Ahmed and Prince Musaid. Prince Mohammad was one of King Khalid's key advisors. In fact, they acted together on almost all political issues. Another of his advisors was Maarouf al-Dawalibi, former Prime Minister of Syria and founder of the Islamic Socialist Front.

Kamal Adham served as the president of Al Mukhabarat Al A'amah or the general intelligence directorate until 19 January 1979 which he had held since 1965. Adham's successor in the post was Turki bin Faisal.

In 1977 a coup attempt by Saudi Air Force personnel, backed by the Libyan Intelligence Service, was discovered and quickly defeated.

Saudi Arabia acquired full control of Aramco in 1980 during his reign and the company was renamed as Saudi Aramco. In March 1980 King Khalid established a constitutional committee with eight members under the presidency of Prince Nayef. However, the committee could not manage to produce the basic law that had been promised. King Khalid implemented a significant policy towards bedouins through a decree dated 15 March 1981 which required them to settle in a fixed place.

In November 1979, Khalid's reign saw two major local incidents which have had significant effects on the politics of Saudi Arabia: the Grand Mosque seizure and the Qatif Uprising.

==== Grand Mosque seizure ====
Some foreign observers thought traditionalism was no longer a strong force in Saudi Arabia. This idea was disproved when at least 500 dissidents invaded and seized the Grand Mosque in Mecca on 20 November 1979. The same day two other raids were made by the groups related to these dissidents in Medina and Taif. The dissidents in Medina were immediately defeated by the Saudi troops. The goal of the dissidents in Taif was to abduct King Khalid who escaped the attack due to the changes in his plans.

When the first news of the attack in Mecca reached Riyadh, the initial reaction of King Khalid was to consult the ulama, to get permission to use military force to eject the attackers. The ulama hesitated and refrained from a definite answer. Only after the assault had been underway for 36 hours did some ulama allow the use of force. At the time of the event, Crown Prince Fahd was in Tunisia for a meeting of the Arab Summit and the commander of the National Guard Prince Abdullah was in Morocco for an official visit. Therefore, King Khalid assigned the responsibility to Prince Sultan, the minister of defense, and Prince Nayef, the minister of interior, to deal with the incident.

The Grand Mosque was regained by Saudi forces on 4 December 1979 and 63 rebels were executed on 9 January 1980 in eight different cities. The executions were decreed by King Khalid after the edict issued by ulemas. Although the Saudi government under King Khalid executed the rebels, the religious establishment that inspired them were given greater powers. And ulema successfully pressed King Khalid to realize their intentions.

==== 1979 Qatif Uprising ====
In November 1979, Shiites in the Eastern Province, particularly in Qatif and in nearby villages, organized protests. Several demonstrators were arrested. The major reason for the uprising was negative conditions in villages. In the spring of 1979, King Khalid announced an annual budget of 160 billion riyals, indicating that this budget would be employed to improve the living conditions of all Saudi citizens. However, the budget did not make any significant contribution to the services. Instead, the royal family benefitted from the budget. Following the release of the demonstrators in February 1980, King Khalid and Crown Prince Fahd visited the Eastern region from town to town. Due to King Khalid's policy change towards the Shiite population in the region, they positively modified their approach towards the Saudi government and abandoned their oppositional ideas and actions.

=== International relations ===
Although King Khalid did not have an extensive interest in foreign affairs as much as King Faisal had, his reign witnessed many important international events, including the Iranian Revolution, the assassination of Anwar Sadat and the Soviet invasion of Afghanistan, all of which had significant effects for Saudi Arabia. In addition, the Saudi government led by King Khalid was much more active in improving the relations of Saudi Arabia with neighbouring states in contrast to the reign of Faisal. His government was also much more moderate and less conservative in regard to the Arab–Israeli conflict than that of King Faisal. Kamal Adham was King Khalid's key counsellor on foreign policy during his reign from 1975 to 1982.

King Khalid initiated a move to bring in foreign labor to help with the country's development.

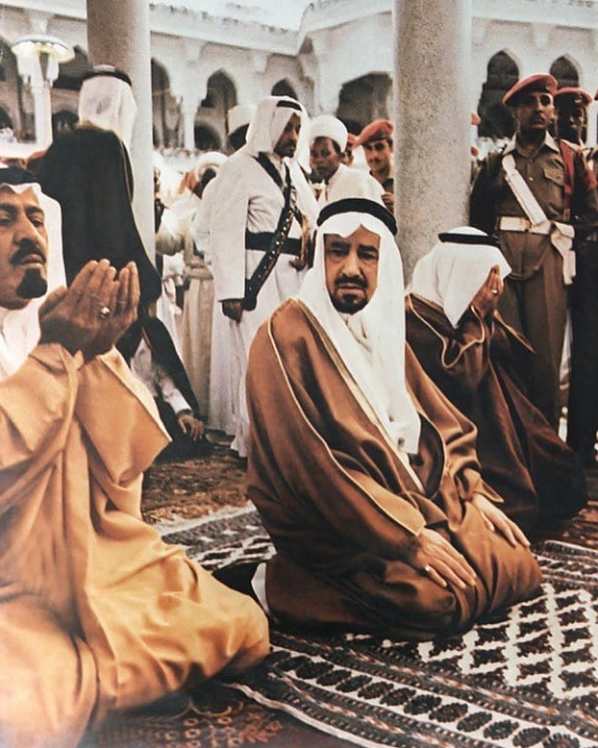
King Khalid praying at a mosque with Prince Abdullah

==== 1975–1980 ====
In April 1975, King Khalid's first diplomatic coup was the conclusion of a demarcation agreement concerning the Al Buraymi Oasis, where the frontiers of Abu Dhabi, Oman and Saudi Arabia meet. Claims and counterclaims over this frontier had exacerbated relations among them for years. Therefore, King Khalid aimed at settling this long-standing boundary disputes. The conclusion of negotiations under King Khalid added to his stature as a statesman. Between 21 and 23 April 1975 a high-level talk was held in Riyadh with the attendance of King Khalid, Egyptian President Anwar Sadat and Syrian President Hafez al-Assad concerning the peace negotiations as a result of the conflict in the Sinai between Egypt and Israel.

Another significant event was the visit of Shah Mohammad Reza Pahlavi of Iran to Riyadh on 28 April 1975. In June 1975, Saudi Arabia appointed an ambassador to the United Arab Emirates, which also assigned an ambassador to Saudi Arabia the same date.

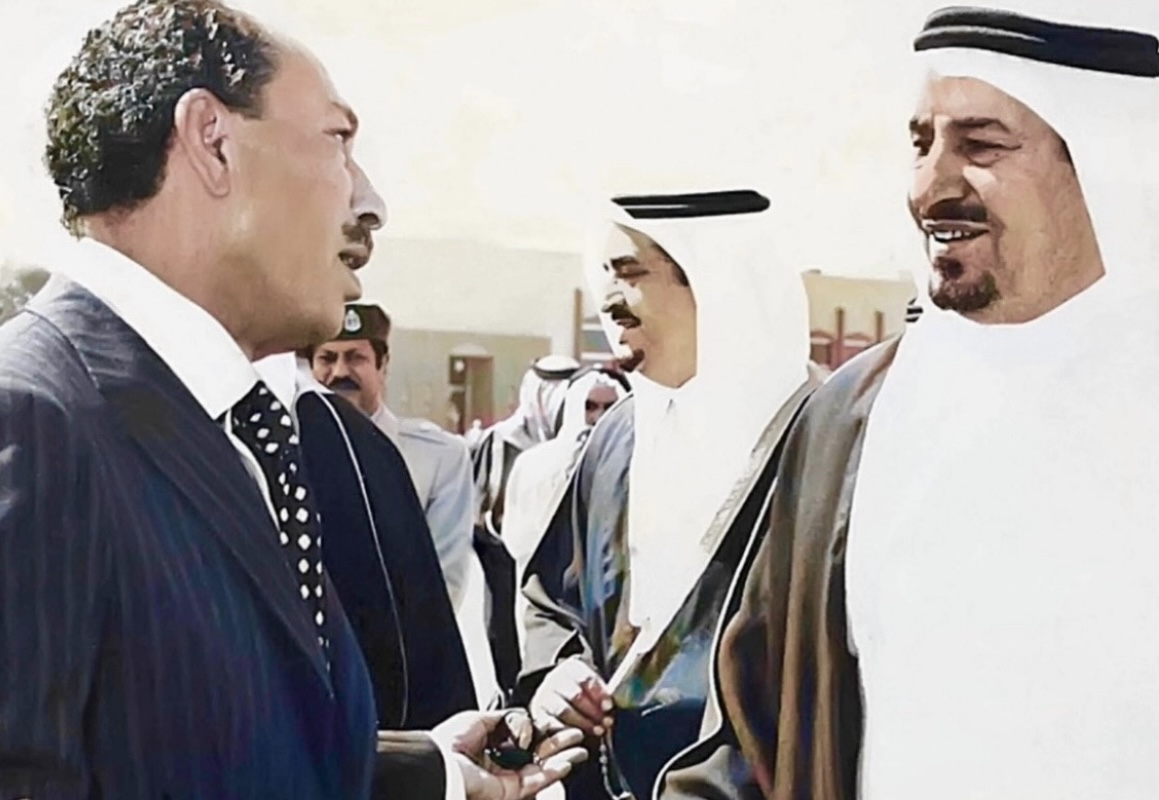
Egyptian President Anwar Sadat receives King Khalid and Crown Prince Fahd in Cairo, July 1975.

His first official visit as the King of Saudi Arabia was to Cairo, Egypt in mid-July 1975. The visit was an indication of Saudi Arabia's support of the initiatives of Anwar Sadat concerning peace settlement between the Arabs and Israel. King Khalid visited Damascus in December 1975 and met with Syrian President Hafez al-Assad to discuss the ways to support Muslims in Lebanon, where a civil war began in April 1975. He declared the Saudi Arabia's support to Syria's role in the war.

Diplomatic relations with the People's Democratic Republic of Yemen were reestablished in March 1976. A month later, in April 1976, King Khalid made state visits to all of the Gulf states in the hope of promoting closer relations with his peninsular neighbors. On 24 May 1976 King Khalid visited Tehran to meet with Shah Mohammad Reza Pahlavi. He also called numerous summits and inaugurated the Gulf Cooperation Council (GCC) in 1981 that is seen an outcome of his early visits. Then GCC was established along with Bahrain, Kuwait, Oman, Qatar and the United Arab Emirates.

One of the significant international moves occurred in the reign of King Khalid was the establishment of the Safari Club, of which the treaty was signed on 1 September 1976. It was a secret organization with the participation of Egypt, France, Iran, Morocco and Saudi Arabia to eliminate the potential influence of communism in the region. The treaty was signed by Kamal Adham on behalf of Saudi Arabia. King Khalid organized a conference in Riyadh in October 1976 to resolve the ongoing Lebanese civil war, and the conference contributed to end the war. The same month he also visited Pakistan, and the visit was mostly concerned with Saudi Arabia's financial support for the joint developmental projects in Pakistan. In addition, he visited Islamabad, Rawalpindi, Lahore and Karachi, and initiated the construction of King Faisal Mosque in Islamabad.

On 19 May 1977, King Khalid met Hafez al-Assad and Anwar Sadat in Riyadh to initiate a coordinated policy on the Arab–Israeli conflict. He also met Prime Minister of Pakistan Zulfikar Ali Bhutto in Riyadh on 18 June 1977. Lebanese Foreign Minister Fuad Butrus was received by King Khalid in Riyadh on 5 July 1977 to discuss the current situation in Lebanon. On 10 July 1977, Yen Chia-kan, President of Taiwan, visited Saudi Arabia and was received by the King in Riyadh. Two days later, on 12 July 1977, King Khalid and Somali President Mohamed Siad Barre met in Jeddah. Sudanese President Jaafar Nimeiry and King Khalid met in Ta'if on 2 August 1977. King Khalid's next visitors were Italian Prime Minister Giulio Andreotti and Foreign Minister Arnaldo Forlani who visited Saudi Arabia on 5–6 August.

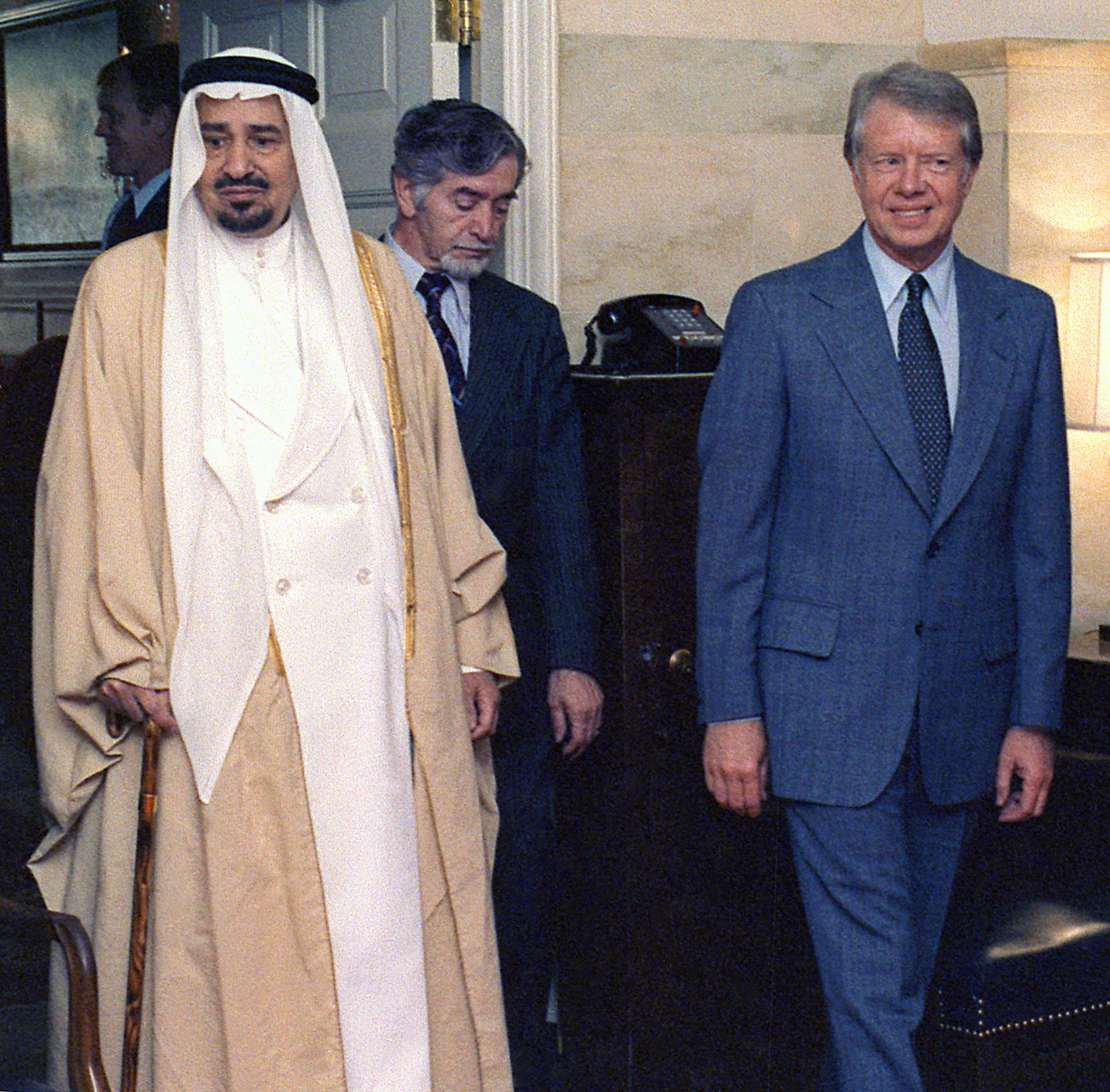
King Khalid with U.S. President Jimmy Carter, 27 October 1978

In early January 1978 the US President Jimmy Carter paid an official visit to Riyadh and met King Khalid to discuss the Middle East peace efforts. Immediately after this meeting Shah Mohammad Reza Pahlavi visited King Khalid on 11 January 1978 to discuss some topics related to the security of the region. Following King Khalid's heart surgery at the Cleveland Clinic on 3 October 1978 Jimmy Carter invited him to the White House for lunch, and they met on 27 October. The Camp David accord which was signed by Egypt and Israel in September 1978 severely affected the Saudi–Egyptian alliance, and Saudi Arabia's diplomatic relations with Egypt were terminated following the Baghdad Conference in November 1978. The same year King Khalid visited France to finalize the procurement of $24 billion military equipment, namely tanks, helicopters, and a complete radar network which was capable of covering the entire Red Sea. Much of this equipment was sent to North Yemen, Sudan, and Somalia to assist their resistance against communism.

Following the 1979 Islamic Revolution in Iran, King Khalid sent Khomeini a congratulatory message, stating that Islamic solidarity could be the basis for closer relations of two countries. He also argued that with the foundation of the Islamic Republic in Iran there were no obstacles that inhibited the cooperation between two countries. In addition, King Khalid requested the secretary-general of the Organization of the Islamic Conference to congratulate the new Iranian government. However, his initiatives were unsuccessful in that Saudi Arabia unofficially supported Iraq against Iran in the Iran–Iraq War in 1980.

On 24 December 1979 Pakistan President Zia ul Haq visited Riyadh and met King Khalid in relation to the Grand Mosque crisis which had been solved at the beginning of the month.

==== 1980–1982 ====
In April 1980 King Khalid cancelled the state visit to Britain as a protest over the broadcasting of Death of a Princess on 9 April 1980 in the United Kingdom that narrated the execution of Misha'al bin Fahd, the granddaughter of Prince Mohammad bin Abdulaziz. King Khalid had been invited by Queen Elizabeth II in June 1979, following the Queen's visit to Saudi Arabia in February 1979, during which King Khalid gave her a diamond necklace. In addition, the British ambassador was expelled from Saudi Arabia for five months due to the broadcasting of the documentary on ITV. Egyptian actress Suzan Abu Talib or Sawsan Badr and other actors who had roles in the documentary were banned from entering Saudi Arabia.

In the capacity of the chairman of the Organisation of Islamic Conference, King Khalid helped Pakistani authorities end the hijacking of the Pakistan International Airlines Flight 326 on 2 March 1981, which was diverted first to Kabul and to Damascus, after President Zia-ul-Haq requested his assistance. Upon meeting then-British Prime Minister Margaret Thatcher in Saudi Arabia in April 1981, King Khalid reportedly said he would be happy to discuss falcons with her, but for all matters of administration she should talk to Crown Prince Fahd. King Khalid's visit to the United Kingdom that had been cancelled in 1980 took place on 9 June 1981 and lasted four days. He then visited Spain on 15 June 1981.

King Khalid asked the U.S. President Jimmy Carter to sell advanced fighter planes to Saudi Arabia to assist in countering communist aggression in the region. The first of sixty F-15 fighter aircraft approved under the Carter administration was delivered to Saudi Arabia in 1982. He purchased a Boeing 747 with an operating room should he be stricken while on his travels. In his memoirs, Jimmy Carter wrote that King Khalid and Crown Prince Fahd assured him of "their unequivocal support for Sadat", but that they would take no concrete public action in support of him.

Just one week before his death, on 6 June 1982, King Khalid sent messages to U.S. President Ronald Reagan and other world leaders stating that urgent intervention was needed to stop what he described as the Israeli massacre in Lebanon, referring to Israeli attacks against Palestinians in the country.

== Views ==
Look after the weak, for the strong can look after themselves.

— King Khalid

In June 1974 when he was Crown Prince Khalid argued that France taught the Syrians to be stubborn, and the British instilled the idea for the Arabs to differ with each other.

At the very beginning of his reign King Khalid stated "Islamic law is and will remain our standard, our source of inspiration, and our goal." and "We are against communism and we will protect ourselves against it by all means. If the United States pressed Israel into making a just peace settlement, Russia would not acquire a single foothold in the Middle East."

He questioned the support of the US administration to Greece instead of Turkey in late May 1976 citing Turkey's contributions in the Korean War during the 1950s. In an interview on BBC Summary of World Broadcasts he expressed the following views on Zionism, Communism and colonialism on 3 July 1979: "We regard Zionism, communism and colonialism as a trinity allied against Arab and Islamic rights and aspirations. Our policy is based on that understanding, and it is natural for us to be always subjected to biased and poisonous campaigns at the hand of that very trinity." Following the defeat of invaders of Grand Mosque King Khalid expressed the following: "if [Juhayman] al Otaibi and his cohorts had targeted palaces rather than the Grand Mosque [in their 1979 uprising] the results of the uprising might have been very different."

At the third summit of the Organization of Islamic Cooperation in Taif in January 1981 he declared non-alignment of Saudi Arabia concerning the tensions between the US and Soviet Union: "Our loyalty must be neither to an eastern bloc nor to a western bloc. The security of the Islamic nation will not be assured by joining a military alliance, nor by taking refuge under the umbrella of a superpower."

== Personal life ==
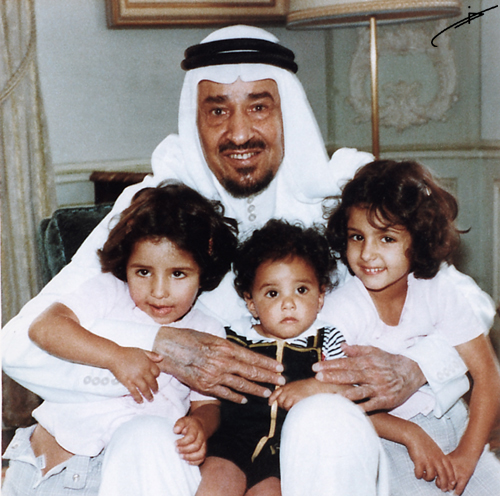
King Khalid with his grandchildren in the late 1970s

King Khalid married four times and was the father of ten children. While the sequence in seniority of his wives is not known clearly, his wives were:

- Latifa bint Ahmed Al Sudairi. Latifa was a daughter of King Abdulaziz's maternal uncle and Khalid was fifteen when he married her. They had no children.
- Tarfa bint Abdullah bin Abdul Rahman Al Saud. She was a daughter of his uncle, Abdullah bin Abdul Rahman. They had no children.
- Noura bint Turki bin Abdulaziz bin Abdullah bin Turki Al Saud. She was the mother of Khalid's elder sons, Prince Bandar and Prince Abdullah and his elder daughter, Al Bandari. Noura bint Turki died at age 95 on 12 September 2011.
- Seeta bint Fahd Al Damir had seven children with King Khalid: Al Jawhara, Fahd (died young), Nouf, Moudi, Hussa, Mishaal, and Faisal. She was from the Ujman tribe in Al Badiyah and was a niece of Wasmiyah Al Damir, wife of Abdullah bin Jiluwi. She died on 25 December 2012 at the age of 90.

Khalid had four sons and six daughters. Prince Bandar, the eldest son of King Khalid, was born in 1935. He was one of the members of Al Saud Family Council established by Crown Prince Abdullah in June 2000 to discuss private issues such as business activities of princes and marriages of princess to individuals who were not member of House of Saud. Prince Bandar died in Mecca in March 2018. His youngest child, Prince Faisal, is the former governor of Asir Province and a member of the Allegiance Council.

Khalid's eldest daughter, Princess Al Bandari, married her cousin Prince Badr, son of Prince Abdul Muhsin. Another of his daughters, Princess Hussa, married Abdullah bin Faisal bin Turki, grandson of Turki I bin Abdulaziz. She died at the age of 59 in November 2010. Two of his daughters married the sons of Abdullah bin Faisal: Princess Al Jawhara married Khalid bin Abdullah Al Saud and has a son, Mohammed, and Princess Nouf married Mohammed bin Abdullah and has four children, including Noura.

Another daughter of Khalid, Moudi, married Prince Abdul Rahman bin Faisal and is the general secretary of the King Khalid Foundation and the Al Nahda Foundation, and a former member of the Consultative Assembly. One of Khalid's daughters, Mishael bint Khalid died in Riyadh in April 2014.

=== Personality, pastimes and property ===
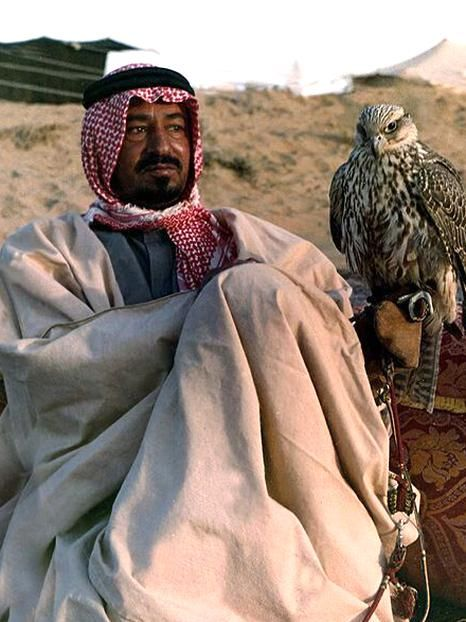
Falconry was an enjoyed pastime of King Khalid.

Khalid was described as warm, cheerful, attentive and devout and was adored by his sisters and brothers. An American journalist from Christian Science Monitor, John K. Cooley, following his observation of King Khalid at majlis stated that he carefully listened to his subjects showing his sense of humor and amused smile. During the first year of his rule King Khalid was said by his close observers to be an open and good man without any pretense representing the best example of Arab gentlemanly culture. His favourite topics to discuss at majlis with visitors were the problems related to education and youth.

Khalid had the capacity to settle conflicts which was first recognized by his father. It was the reason for sending him to Yemen in 1935 to handle the problems with local people. During his kingship Khalid acted as a mediator between the Sudairi brothers and Prince Abdullah although he was much closer to the latter.

Falconry and horse-riding were Khalid's favorite pastimes. He was described as a man of the desert. He had one of the best falcon collections. In the late 1970s King Khalid was given a rare Alberta-trained gyrfalcon by the Canadian government as a gift. Hunting was also one of his favorites, and he went to African countries to participate in hunting safaris when he was young. Khalid bought the first Toyota Landcruiser in 1955 for falconry. In December 1975 he bought the then longest Cadillac at 25 feet and 2 inches long again for falconry, and Time magazine called it "Khalidillac". In June 1974 while he was Crown Prince in a meeting with US Secretary of State Henry Kissinger Khalid stated that he had been interested in hunting with hawks for forty years.

In the same meeting Kissinger asked him where he lived. In response he stated that he lived in Riyadh, but in the summer he stayed in Taif. King Khalid owned a desert farm outside Riyadh at Um Hamam. He bought Beechwood House in the north London suburb of Highgate for £1.9 million in March 1977 to use following two operations on his hip in the Wellington Hospital in London.

=== Health ===
When Khalid bin Abdulaziz was crown prince, he had a massive heart attack in 1970 and had a heart surgery in 1972 at the Cleveland Clinic in the United States. Since King Khalid suffered from heart ailment for a long period of time, Crown Prince Fahd was in charge of ruling the country. On 3 October 1978, he underwent a second heart surgery again in Cleveland. He also had a hip operation at Wellington Hospital in London in 1976. In February 1980, King Khalid had a minor heart attack.

== Death and funeral ==
King Khalid died on 13 June 1982 due to a heart attack in his summer palace in Taif. On the same day his body was brought from Taif to Mecca. After funeral prayers at the Grand Mosque in Mecca, King Khalid was buried in Al Oud cemetery in Riyadh. Leaders of Qatar, Kuwait, Djibouti, the United Arab Emirates and Bahrain, as well as President of Egypt Hosni Mubarak, participated in the funeral.

== Legacy ==
King Khalid International Airport, King Khalid University, King Khalid Eye Specialist Hospital in Riyadh, King Khalid Military City and King Khalid Medical City in the Eastern province were all named after him. In Riyadh there is also a mosque named after him, King Khalid Grand Mosque, serving the Muslims since 1988. In Jeddah a bridge is named after King Khalid. There is a research center on wildlife in Saudi Arabia named after him, Khalid Wildlife Research Centre.

In addition, his family established King Khalid Foundation, which is being headed by his son, Abdullah bin Khalid. The foundation awards individuals who have achievements in the fields of corporate social responsibility, nonprofit management and social innovation.

=== Awards ===
In January 1981 King Khalid was awarded by the United Nations (UN) a gold medal which is the UN's highest decoration for the statesmen who significantly contributed to peace and cooperation worldwide. King Khalid also received the King Faisal International Prize for Service to Islam due to his efforts in support of Islamic solidarity in 1981.

== Honours ==
Styles of King Khalid
- Reference style: His Majesty
- Spoken style: Your Majesty

=== Foreign honours ===
- Indonesia:
  - First Class of the Star of the Republic of Indonesia (June 1975)
- Malaysia:
  - Honorary Recipient of the Order of the Crown of the Realm (January 1982)
- Spain:
  - Collar of the Order of Charles III (15 June 1981)
  - Grand Cross of the Order of Civil Merit (15 February 1974)
- Sweden:
  - Knight of the Royal Order of the Seraphim (20 January 1981)
- Taiwan:
  - Grand Cordon of the Order of Brilliant Jade (July 1977)

== See also ==
- List of Saudi rulers
- List of things named after king khalid

Khalid of Saudi Arabia House of Saud Born: 1913 Died: 1982
Regnal titles
Preceded by Faisal	King of Saudi Arabia; 1975–1982	Succeeded by Fahd
Saudi Arabian royalty
Preceded by Muhammad	Crown Prince of Saudi Arabia; 1965–1975	Succeeded by Fahd
Political offices
Preceded by Faisal	Prime Minister of Saudi Arabia; 1975–1982	Succeeded by Fahd
