= Abdul Rahman bin Faisal Al Saud (1942–2014) =

Saudi royal, military officer and businessman (1942–2014)

- Born: 1942; Taif
- Died: March 2014 (aged 71–72)
- Spouse: Moudi bint Khalid Al Saud
- Issue: List: Princess Sarah Prince Saud Princess Al Bandari
Names
- Abdul Rahman bin Faisal bin Abdulaziz bin Abdul Rahman Al Saud
- House: Al Saud
- Father: King Faisal
- Mother: Iffat bint Mohammad Al Thunayan
- Education: Royal Military Academy Sandhurst

Abdul Rahman bin Faisal Al Saud (Arabic: عبد الرحمن بن الفيصل آل سعود; 1942 – March 2014) was a Saudi royal, a son of King Faisal, one of the grandsons of Saudi Arabia's founder King Abdulaziz, military officer, and businessman.

== Early life and education ==
Prince Abdul Rahman was born in Taif in 1942. He was the fifth child and third son of King Faisal and Iffat bint Mohammad Al Thunayan. His full siblings were Sara bint Faisal, Mohammed bin Faisal, Latifa bint Faisal, Saud bin Faisal, Bandar bin Faisal, Turki bin Faisal, Luluwah bint Faisal and Haifa bint Faisal.

Prince Abdul Rahman graduated from the Hun School and then, from the Sandhurst Military Academy in 1963. During his studies at the Sandhurst Military Academy, he participated in fencing competitions representing the Academy.

== Career ==
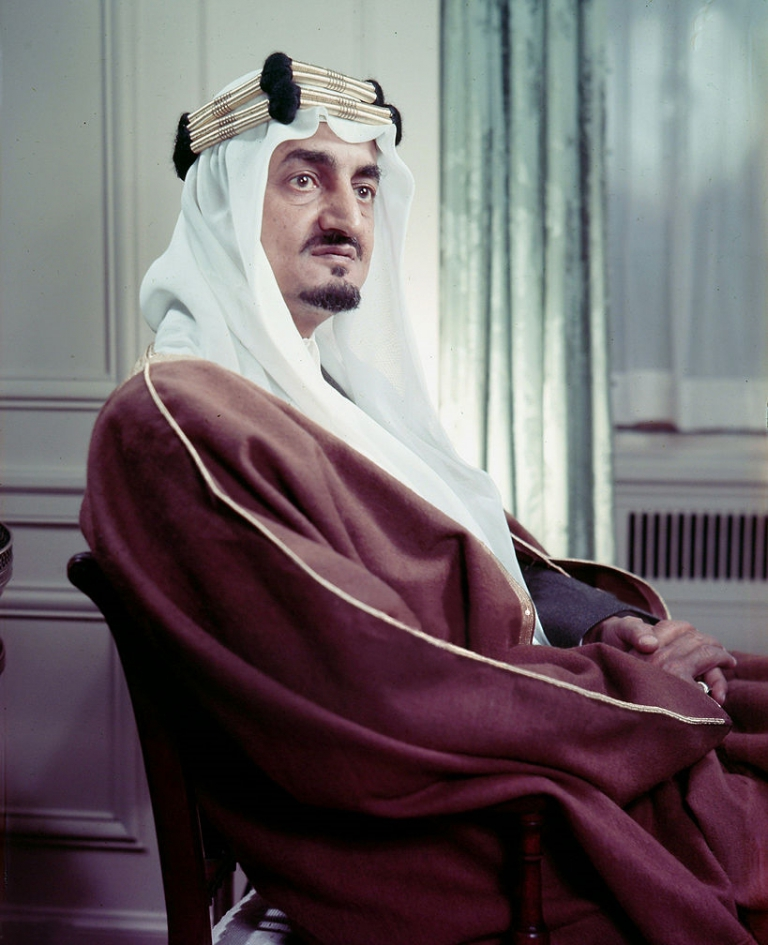
King Faisal, father of Abdul Rahman

Following his graduation, Prince Abdul Rahman joined the land forces of Saudi army. He served as a commander of an armoured brigade in the tank corps and headed the armour project of the army. Later, he retired from the military and was involved in business activities.

== Personal life ==
Prince Abdul Rahman married Moudi bint Khalid, daughter of King Khalid. He had three children with her: Princess Sarah, Prince Saud and Princess Al Bandari. Al Bandari bint Abdul Rahman died in March 2019. His son, Saud, is a businessman and a member of the board of trustees of Arab Thought Foundation. Prince Saud has also been a member of the Effat University's board of founders and board of trustees since 2014.

== Death ==
In early March 2014, Saudi royal court announced the death of Prince Abdul Rahman. Funeral ceremony was held after the afternoon prayer on 5 March 2014 at the Imam Turki bin Abdullah Mosque in Riyadh.
