= Effat University =

Private university in Jeddah, Saudi Arabia

- Motto: "Aspire to Achieve"
- Type: Private university
- Established: 1999; 27 years ago
- Chairman: HRH Princess Sara bint Faisal Al Saud
- President: Dr Haifa Reda Jamalallail
- Administrative staff: 221
- Undergraduates: 1,000
- Postgraduates: 90
- Location: Jeddah, Makkah, Saudi Arabia
- Colors: Blue
- Website: www.effatuniversity.edu.sa

Effat University (Arabic: جامعة عفّت) is a private non-profit institution of higher education for men and women in Jeddah, Saudi Arabia, operating under the umbrella of King Faisal Charitable Foundation. On 30 January 2009, Effat College became Effat University. The inauguration of its four colleges, the establishment of the Research and Consultancy Institute, and success achieved on the academic, education and social levels, paved the way to becoming a university.

In 2011, Effat University obtained approval for its first graduate program. In 2019, Effat University celebrated its 20th anniversary.

== History ==
Effat College was founded by the children of King Faisal and Effat Al Thunayyan. Princess Lolowah Al Faisal played a prominent role in its founding, from raising funds, developing the curriculum, overseeing construction to the hiring of faculty and staff. Sara bint Faisal is the chair of the board of founders and board of trustees, while Lolowah is vice chair and general supervisor of the university. Effat University is considered the first private woman college in Saudi Arabia.

For the first time it will open its doors to male students in 2022.

University rankings

Global – Overall
- QS World: 851-900 (2026)

== Departments ==
Effat University consists of the following departments:

- Effat College of Engineering:

Electrical and Computer Engineering, and Computer Science departments

- Effat College of Architecture and Design:

Architecture, Cinematic Arts, and Design departments

- Effat College of Business:

Finance, Marketing, Human Resources Management, Supply Chain Management, and Entrepreneurship

- Effat College of Humanities:

English and Translation and Psychology departments

- Graduate Studies:

Masters of Science in Finance (MSF), Master of Science in Urban Design (MSUD), Master of Science in Translation Studies (MTS), and Master of Science in Energy Engineering

== Partnerships ==
Effat University has built relationships and agreements with national and international institutions and universities. It has partnered with Syracuse University, Swarthmore College, Georgetown University, Mount Holyoke College, The Prince's School of Traditional Arts, American University of Cairo, the French General Consulate, Duke University, Pratt School of Engineering, University of Miami School of Architecture, University of Cincinnati College of Education Criminal Justice and Human Services, and the USC School of Cinematic Arts.

== See also ==
- List of universities and colleges in Saudi Arabia
- MEMP Students Create Labs for Saudi Arabian Women Engineering Students
- Engineering School at Effat University
- Effat University's Partnerships and Affiliations
