= Education in Saudi Arabia =

Kingdom of Saudi Arabia Ministry of Education
- Minister of Education: Yousef Al-Benyan (since 2022)

National education budget
- Budget: $53.4 billion (200 Billion SAR)

General details
- Primary languages: Arabic

Literacy (2020)
- Total: 98%
- Male: 99%
- Female: 96%

Enrollment
- Total: 7.5 million
- Primary: 3.8 million
- Secondary: 1.8 million
- Post secondary: 3.6 million

Attainment
- Post-secondary diploma: 71% (2008)

Public education in Saudi Arabia—from primary education through college—is open to every Saudi citizen. Education is the second-largest sector of government spending in Saudi Arabia. Saudi Arabia spends 8.8% of its gross domestic product on education, which is nearly double the global average of 4.6%. Saudi Arabia is an Islamic country and therefore Islam is interwoven in every part of society, also in education. Islamic studies are part of the education system alongside scientific and social studies that vary from one educational institution to another. Important goals of education in Saudi Arabia are to teach the students the economic, religious and social norms of the country. They also want to reduce the high illiteracy. The education system consists of 3 levels: primary education, intermediate education and secondary education.

In 1926 the Department of Education was established and in 1957 the first university. Before the King Saud University was founded, a number of Saudi Arabians went abroad to attend university. In 1955 the first school for girls was established. Saudi Arabia has special institutions for students with severe disabilities and autism.

== Background ==
The entrance gate of King Saud University, the kingdom's oldest university, founded in 1957

The first forms of education in Saudi Arabia can be traced back to the time when the message of Islam was revealed and spread. Education is important in Islam, because Islam obligates both men and women to learn and gain knowledge. Schools were established, first by wealthy Muslims and later by the Ottomans. These schools were called 'Kuttabs' (كُتَّاب) and were often connected to the mosque. Most of the time the imam of the mosque was also the teacher of the school, he taught the children how to read and write and recite Quran. During the 17th century education became more important, but all education was still mostly Islamic education.

In 1926 the country's first Department of Education was established by king Abdulaziz bin Abdul Rahman Al Saud. Through his reforms the number of schools and kuttabs started growing as well as the number of students that were enrolled. In 1951 this number had risen to 29,887 students and 226 schools. In 1957 the King Saud University was established, this was the first university in the country. In 1964 the first government school for girls was established.

The goal of the education system is to both reduce the illiteracy, as well as to educate the students on the social, economic and Islamic norms. Saudi education is noted for its religious content. As of 2016, religious studies averaged a total of nine periods a week at the primary school level, compared to an average about 23 periods a week total for mathematics, science (physics, chemistry, biology and geology), social studies, Arabic language, English language and physical education. At the university level, nearly two-thirds of graduates are women.

The education system was in the 1980s and 1990s criticized for "poorly trained teachers, low retention rates, lack of rigorous standards, weak scientific and technical instruction", despite generous budgets, that have compelled the kingdom to depend on large numbers of expatriates workers to fill technical and administrative positions. Cultural theology has also historically held influence over women's education in Saudi Arabia. In 2019, however, the Saudi embassy in the U.S. noted that "While the study of Islam remains at its core, the modern Saudi educational system also provides quality instruction in diverse fields of arts and sciences."

== Education management system ==
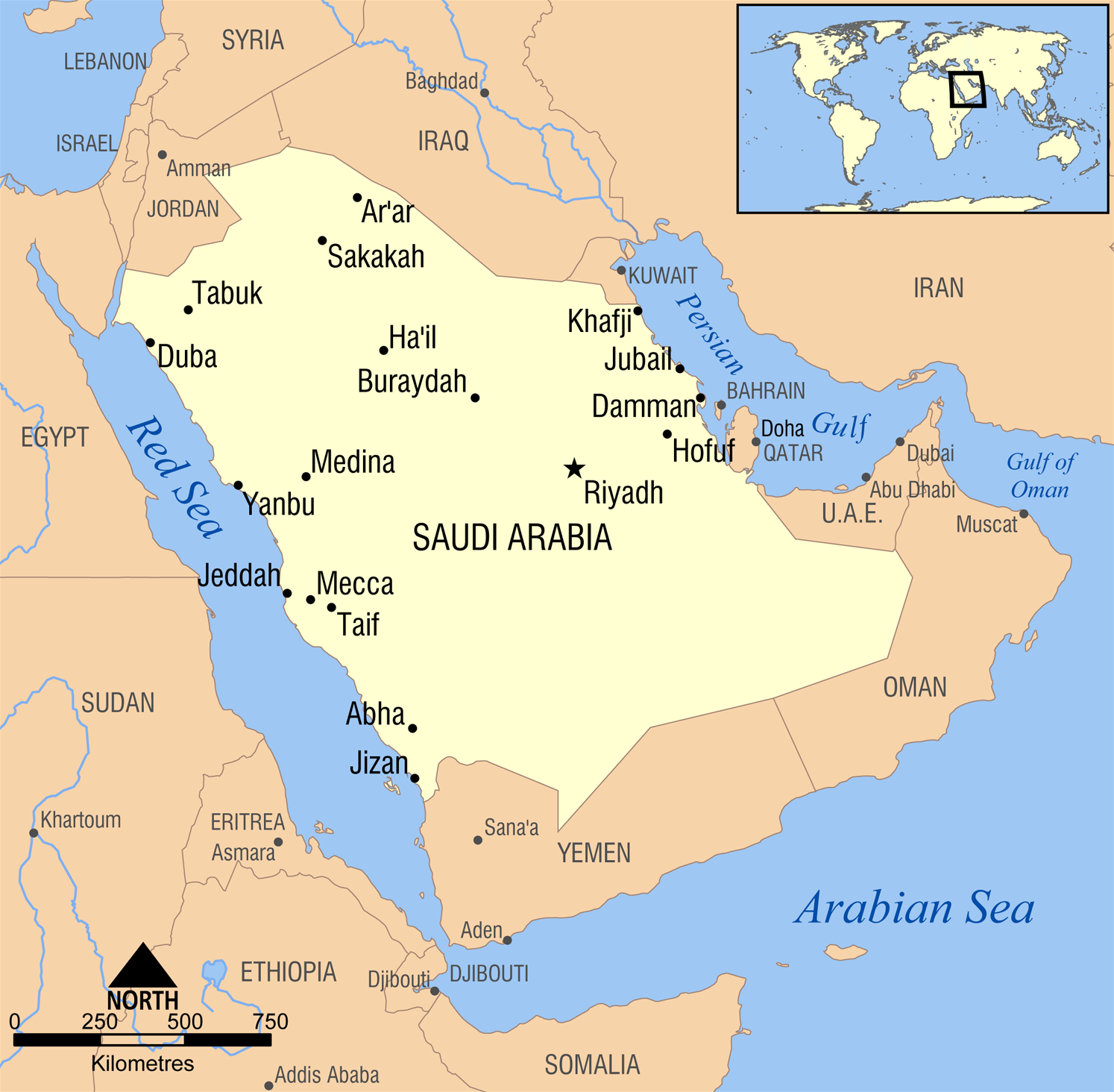
Map of Saudi Arabia

Education is free for all students at all levels. The education system in Saudi Arabia is primarily under the jurisdiction of the Ministry of Education and the Technical and Vocational Training Corporation (TVTC). Other authorities such as the Ministry of Defense and Aviation, the Presidency of the National Guard, and the Ministry of the Interior provide their affiliates and children with education at all levels, consistent with Ministry of Education guidelines. The highest authority that supervises education in Saudi Arabia is the Supreme Committee for Educational Policy, established in 1963.

According to the World Bank database, public spending on education was 5.1 percent of GDP in 2006, and public spending on education as a percentage of government expenditure was 27.6 percent in 2004. Education spending as a percentage of overall spending tripled from 1970 to 2000, and neither economic growth nor the price of oil had much impact on this trend.

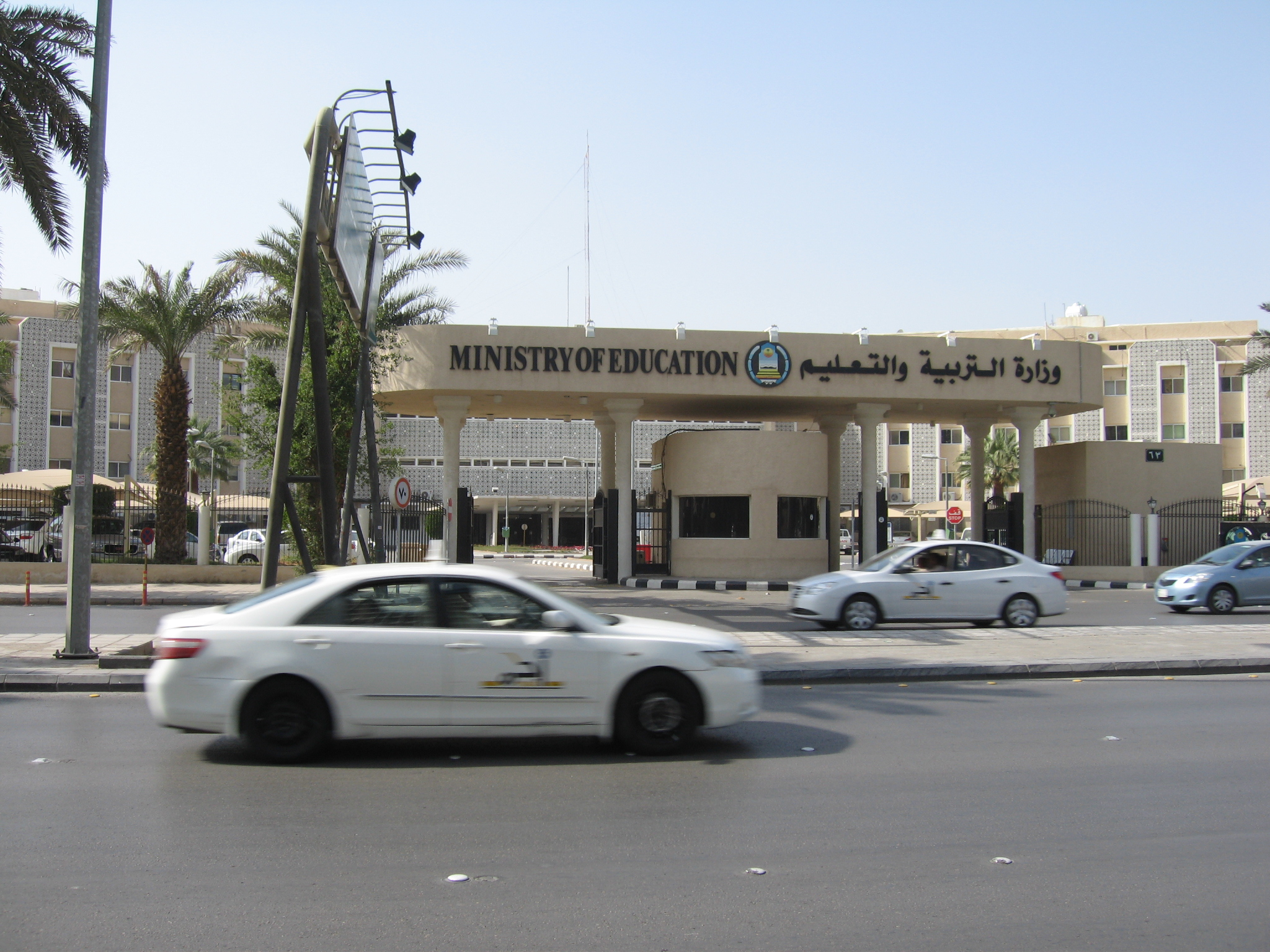
The Ministry of Education in Riyadh

The Ministry of Education developed The Ministry of Education Ten–Year Plan 1425–1435 Hijri, (Note: This figure is based on the Islamic calendar, the Gregorian calendar equivalent is 2004–2014.) which set the following goals:

- The education of 4- to 6-year-old children and the consideration of kindergarten as an independent stage as compared with other educational stages in terms of its buildings and syllabi
- Accommodation of all age categories from 6 to 18 years old at various stages of education
- Deepening the spirit of loyalty and pride of the country through intellectual awareness of Saudi Arabia's national issues
- Preparing students academically and culturally at the local and international levels to be able to achieve advanced international posts in the fields of mathematics and science for various age categories, taking into account International tests' standards
- Organization of girls' technical education
- Development of an educational system for students with special needs
- Development and growth of educational and administrative training for the Ministry's personnel
- Improvement of internal and external sufficiency for the educational system
- Development of syllabi based on Islamic values leading to the development of male and female students' personality and to their integration in society as well as to the achievement of scientific and thinking skills and life characteristics resulting in self-education and lifelong learning
- To improve the quality of male and female teachers and to increase the citizens' rate in the education sector to achieve the full use of Saudi human resources
- To develop the educational structure and to update the school map to meet the expected quantitative and qualitative changes in the next stage
- To develop the infrastructure of information and communication technology and its employment in education and learning
- To develop male and female adults' education and to eradicate illiteracy
- The Ministry's comprehensive administrative development
- Expansion of social participation in education
- To establish integrated systems for accountability

== Pre-primary education ==
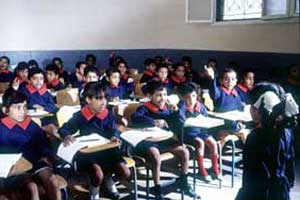
Saudi children at school in Sayhat, Qatif (1972)

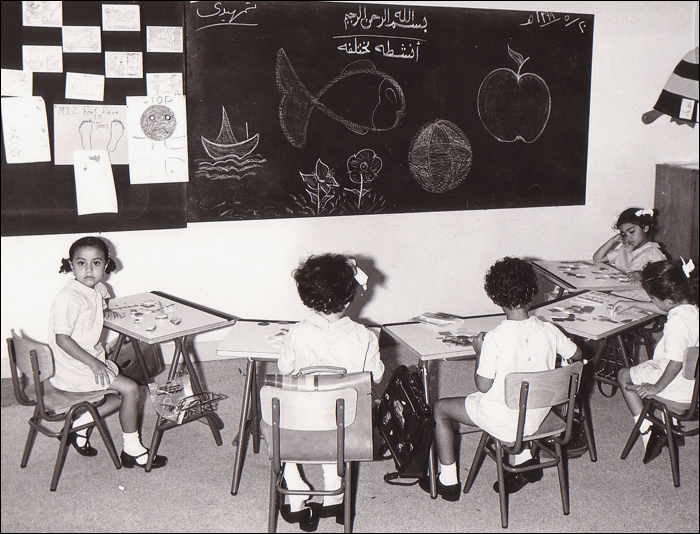
A classroom

In Saudi Arabia, children aged 3–5 years go to kindergarten. However, attendance of kindergartens is not a prerequisite for enrollment of first grade of primary education and kindergartens are not part of the official education ladder. Some private numbers have been established with technical and financial first aid-kit from the government. According to government data, 3,657,283 students were enrolled in pre-primary education in 2022. The gross enrollment percentage was 10.8%, for boys 11.1% for girls and 10.4% in total.

== Primary education ==
Primary education is compulsory for all children in Saudi-Arabia. Primary education lasts 6 years, from the age of 6 until 12. The curriculum consists of Arabic, Islamic education, mathematics, science and art. In 2021 the ministry of education introduced a new rule that required schools to start teaching English from first grade onwards as well. The goal of this requirement is to improve the education outcomes. In 2018, 9% of the students were enrolled in a private school.

== Intermediate and secondary education ==
Intermediate education in Saudi Arabia lasts three years. According to government data, 1,144,548 students (609,300 male and 535,248 female) were in intermediate education in 2007 and the number of teachers totaled 108,065 (54,034 male and 54,031 female) in 2007. According to gross enrollment the total rate was 95.9 percent in 2007.

Secondary education in Saudi Arabia also lasts three years and is the final stage of general education. After the intermediate education, students have the opportunity for both general and specialized secondary education. Technical secondary institute which provide technical and vocational education and training programs lasts three years in the fields of industry, commerce and agriculture.

According to the educational plan for secondary (high school) education 1435–1438 Hijri, students enrolling in the "natural sciences" path are required to take five religion subjects which are tawhid, fiqh, tafsir, hadith and Islamic education and Quran. However, in 2021 the Saudi Ministry of Education merged the multiple Islamic subjects into one single book as part of a series of reforms to revamp the school education system. In addition, students are required to take six science subjects which are mathematics, physics, chemistry, biology, geology and computer science.

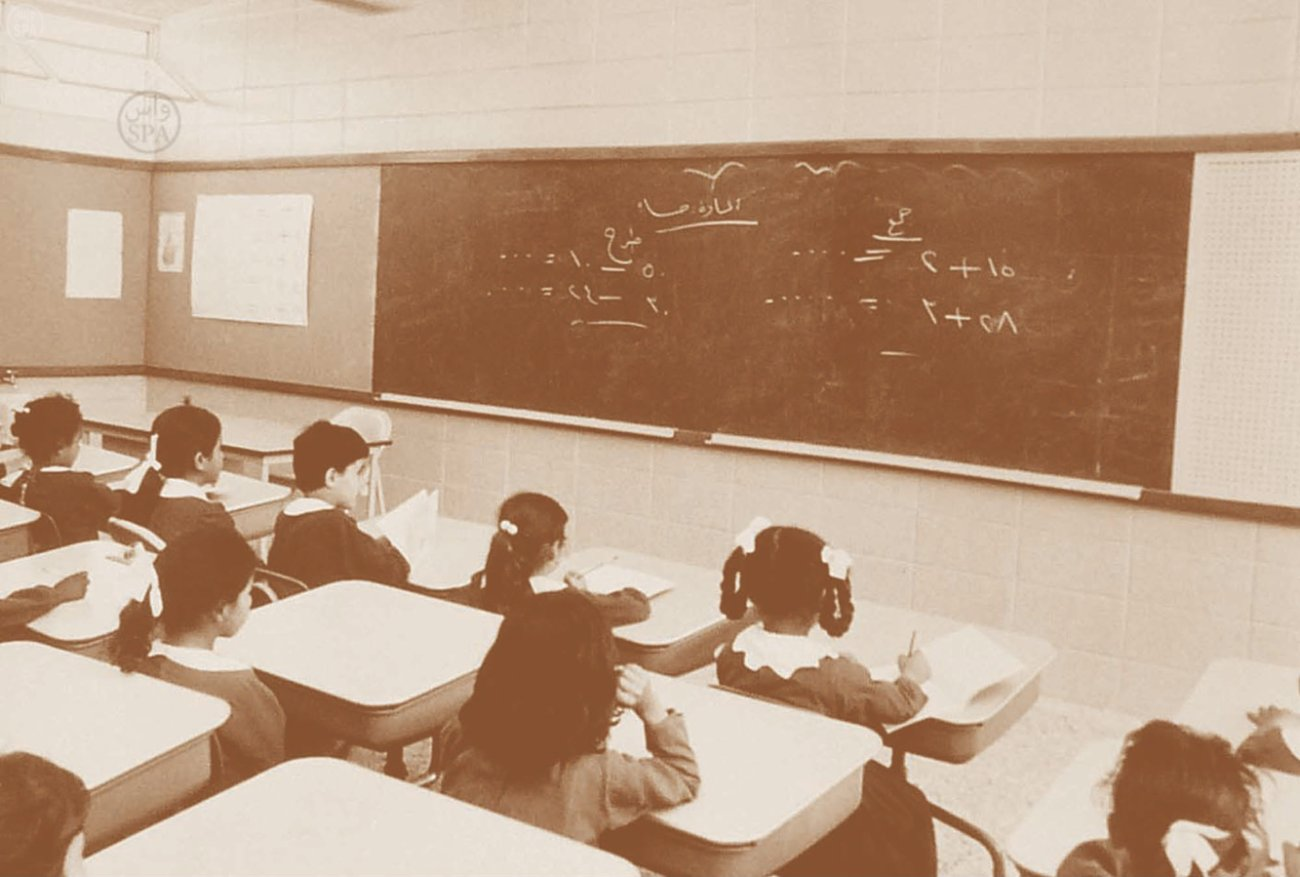
A mathematics class

According to government data, 1,013,074 students (541,849 male and 471,225 female) were in secondary education in 2007 and the number of teachers totaled 87,823 (41,108 male and 46,715 female) in 2007.

As of 2007, gross enrollment rates were 91.8% in secondary education.

== Post-secondary/higher education ==
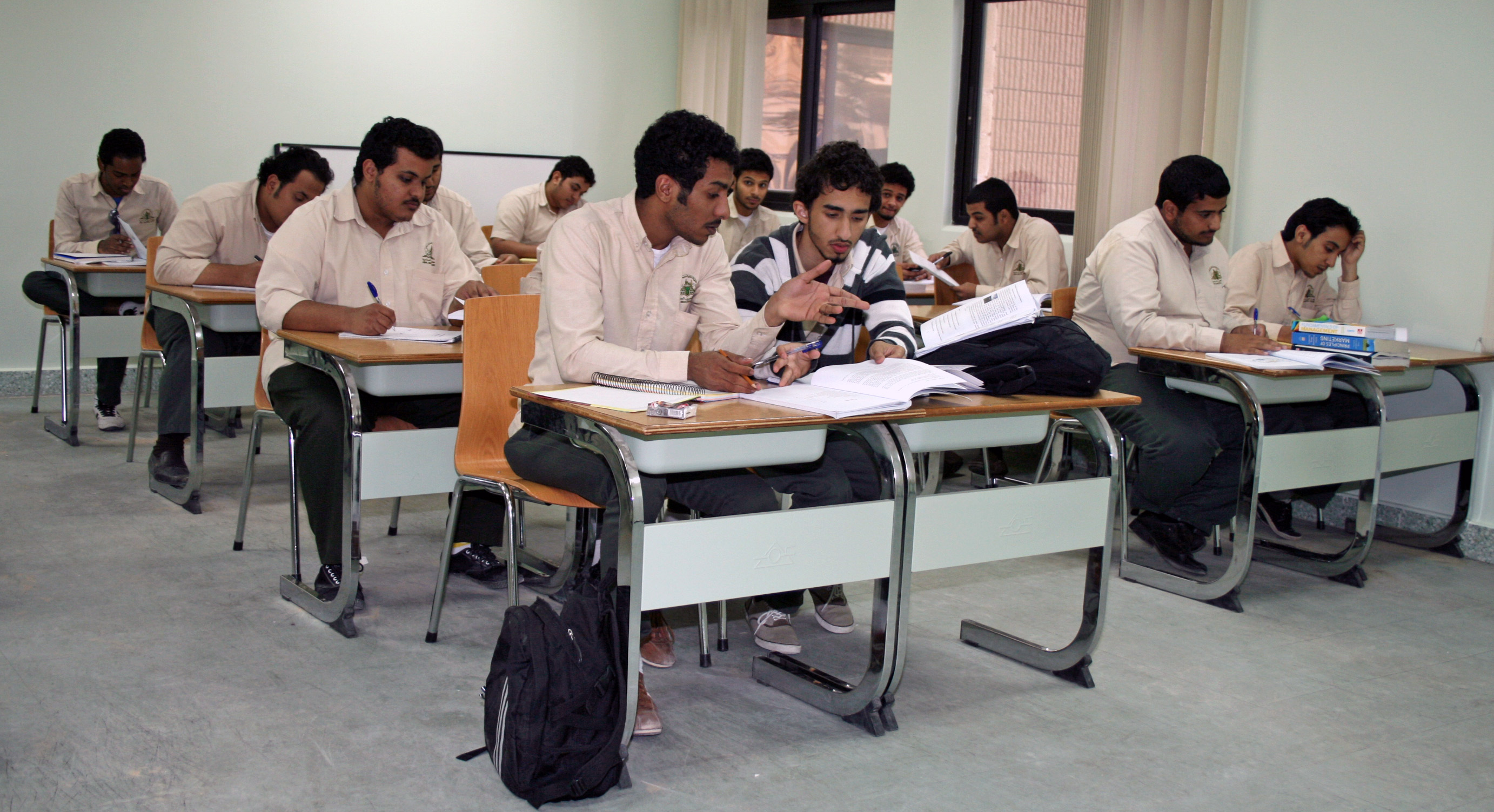
Saudi students at Jubail Industrial College

The first university was established in 1957. This was the King Saud University. This was also the first university in all the Arab states of the Arabian Gulf. There were only twenty-one students enrolled. But twenty-five years later, in 1982, Saudi Arabia already had seven universities with 63,563 students enrolled. Today investment in higher education has outstripped the western world in some cases.

Higher education in Saudi Arabia lasts four years in the field of humanities and social sciences, and five to six years in the field of medicine, engineering and pharmacy.

There are 24 government universities in Saudi Arabia, established in a short span of time. Among them, Taibah University, Qassim University and Taif University were established under the Seventh Development Plan. The universities consists of colleges and departments that offer diplomas, and bachelor's, master's and PhD degrees in various scientific and humanities specializations. Some colleges and departments also provide distance learning. There also exist private colleges, community colleges affiliated to universities, and girls colleges, in addition to government agencies and institutions that provide specialist university-level education.

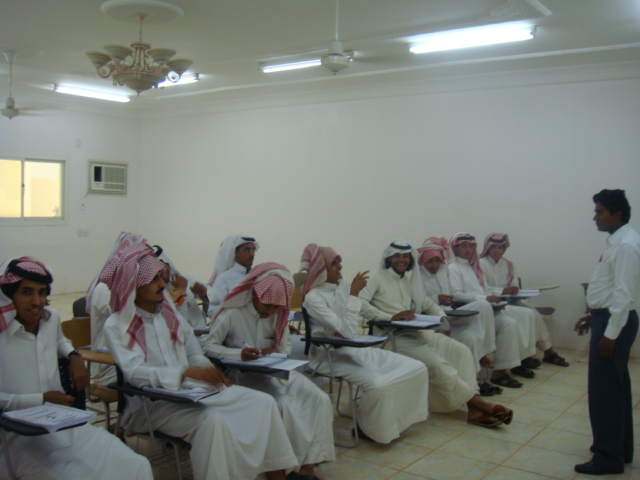
An instructor (right) interacting with Saudi students in class at Najran University

According to a World Bank report, more than 70 percent of the students in Saudi Arabia are in the fields of humanities and social sciences, a figure similar to that of other Arab countries, like Djibouti, Egypt, Morocco, Oman, United Arab Emirates, and West Bank and Gaza.

According to government data, a total of 636,245 (268,080 male and 368,165 female) students were enrolled in higher education in 2006. Among them, 528,146 students (187,489 male and 340,657 female) were in Bachelor programs, 9,768 students (5,551 male and 4,217 female) were in Master programs, and 2,410 students (1,293 male and 1,117 female) were in Ph.D. programs. Another 93,968 students (72,199 male and 21,769 female) were in Intermediate Diploma courses and 1,953 students (1,548 male and 405 female) were in Higher Diploma course. According to the World Bank, in 2006 the gross enrollment ratio for females was 36.1 percent, the gross enrollment ratio for males was 24.7 percent, and the total gross enrollment ratio was 30.2 percent.

Saudi Arabia continues to play a central role in the regional higher education, with several universities ranked among the Arab world’s top institutions, like King Fahd University of Petroleum & Minerals, King Saud University, King Abdulaziz University, Imam Abdulrahman Bin Faisal University, King Khalid University.

In 2005, King Abdullah implemented a government scholarship program to send young Saudi nationals to Western universities for undergraduate and postgraduate studies. The program offers funds for tuition and living expenses for up to four years. An estimated 5,000 Saudi students received government scholarships to study abroad for the 2007/2008 academic year. Students mostly studied at universities in Canada, the United States, the United Kingdom, Australia, New Zealand, Switzerland, France, and Germany.

The universities in the United Kingdom which provide distance learning in Saudi Arabia include the University of Leicester. It has ranked in the top 1% of universities in the world by THE World University Rankings.

In the United Kingdom alone, more than 15,000 Saudi students, 25% of whom are women, attend universities. The large number of students also includes Saudis paying their own tuition. The large influx of Saudi students to the United Kingdom prompted the Saudi Ministry of Higher Education in 2010 to close access to the country for further study.

== Girls' and women's education ==
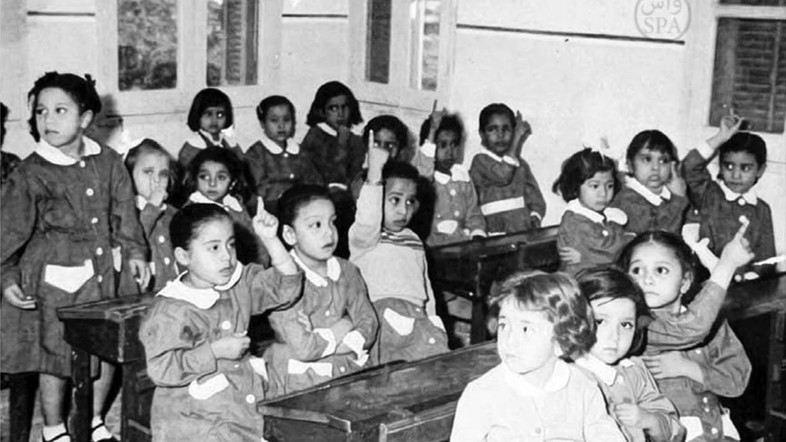
An all-girls school class in Saudi Arabia

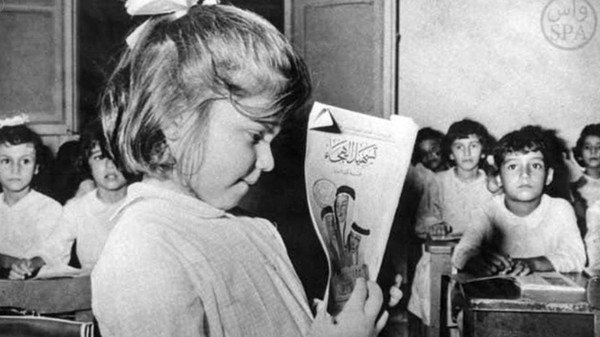
A young female pupil holds a book during a class in session

In 1955, the Dar al-Hanan and Nassif private schools for girls opened in the city of Jeddah. The openings were prompted by Iffat, the wife of Faisal of Saudi Arabia. Afterwards the Saudi government began opening state-operated girls schools. Religious fundamentalists protested the openings of the schools. In 1963 King Faisal brought soldiers to control protesters when a girls' school opened in Buraydah. During Saudi Arabia's first oil boom many Saudi males who studied abroad brought foreign wives back to Saudi Arabia. This caused concern among Saudi fathers with daughters eligible for marriage. In the late 1970s the Saudi government greatly increased university spots for women as a way of slowly progressing and not to clash with traditional culture at the time.

The General Administration of Girls' Education (also called the General Presidency for Girls' Education) was established independently from the Ministry of Education when girls education was started in Saudi Arabia in 1960. Girls education was put under the control of a separate administration controlled by conservative clerics as "a compromise to calm public opposition to allowing (not requiring) girls to attend school".

60% of university students in Saudi Arabia are Saudi women. In Saudi Arabia, women in the labor force are mainly in the education sector. The first group of women graduated from a law program in 2008. On 6 October 2013, the first four women received their legal licences to practice law, not only as legal consultants but as lawyers in courtrooms and before the Saudi judiciary.

According to the World Bank report, female students in higher education in Saudi Arabia outnumber those in Jordan, Tunisia and West Bank and Gaza.

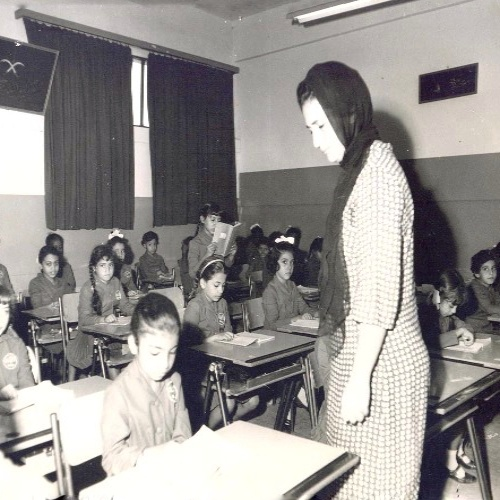
Iffat bint Mohammad Al Thunayan was a pioneer and activist for women's education in Saudi Arabia.

According to the World Bank, gross enrollment rate for females is 36.1 percent, gross enrollment rate for males is 24.7 percent, and gross enrollment rate for total was 30.2 percent in 2006. There are thousands of female professors throughout Saudi Arabia.

Around 2009, an expert on girls' education became the first female minister in Saudi Arabia. Nora bint Abdullah al-Fayez, a US-educated former teacher, was made deputy education minister in charge of a new department for female students. In addition, Saudi Arabia provides female students with one of the world's largest scholarship programs. By this program, thousands of women have earned doctorates from Western universities.

The building of colleges and universities for women, which was recently announced by the government, is critically important. Women constitute 60% of Saudi Arabia's college students but only 14.4% of its labor force, much lower than in neighboring countries. 85% of employed Saudi women work in education, 6% in public health, and 95% in the public sector. Princess Nora bint Abdul Rahman University (PNU) is the first women's university in Saudi Arabia and largest women-only university in the world, composed of 32 campuses across the Riyadh region.

According to the Saudi Ministry of Education, Saudi women's undergraduate enrollment rates surpassed those of men in 2015, with women comprising 52 percent of all university students in the kingdom.

== Gifted education ==
The early interest in gifted education in Saudi Arabia began in 1969 when the official educational policy was approved by the Council of Ministers, highlighting the need for special care and opportunities for gifted individuals. Subsequent developments in the field of gifted education in Saudi Arabia can be summarized in seven major historical movements, including the establishment of a national program for identifying and nurturing gifted students, the establishment of a foundation for giftedness and creativity, the implementation of school-based enrichment programs, and the establishment of the first special school for gifted students. More recent developments include the adoption of academic acceleration methods and the establishment of gifted education classes in public schools. Despite early policies and regulations, formal gifted education programs in public schools were established only in 2002. The vision for Saudi Arabia in 2030 emphasizes the importance of supporting gifted youth, creativity, and innovation, with strategic objectives aimed at improving the learning environment to stimulate creativity and innovation. This vision plays a leading role in reforming the policy and practices of gifted education in Saudi schools, paving the way for further advancements and opportunities for gifted students.

The Ministry of Education in Saudi Arabia defines gifted students as those who demonstrate exceptional abilities requiring special educational care not provided in regular academic programs. The definition of giftedness was developed based on Marland's definition of gifted children in 1972. Challenges they face include the lack of a suitable curriculum and insufficient differentiation between them and non-gifted children.

Efforts to differentiate education for gifted children in Saudi Arabia began as early as 1969 when the Council of Ministers approved an official educational policy which had three main regulations. They included a directive to the state to offer specialized care that developed and opened opportunities for talents, a framework for determining talented children be developed by authorities and talented individuals to be exposed to scientific research. Further policies were enacted from the Companions Foundations for Giftedness and Creativity in 2002 also commonly known as Mawhiba, to establishment of special education classes in schools by 2018. The definition of a gifted student in the country has also been subject to change. The current definition as prescribed by the country's Ministry of Education is "student who has extraordinary aptitudes and abilities or outstanding performance (...) in the areas of mental excellence, educational achievement, creativity and innovation, and special skills and abilities..".

The government has specialized on enrichment programs which talented students are enrolled in after identification based on set scientific standards and bases. The enrichment programs provide a variety of education with more depth and breadth than in normal schools. The programs are in different types and students' access is not limited meaning students can experience more than one. An example is the summer enrichment program (SEP) which mainly focuses on STEM subjects. SEP is mainly implemented as research in schools and impacts both students and teachers. The program is driven by Mawhiba and yields significant results e.g., in 2019, over 6000 students benefitted from the program. The Ministry of Education has not focused much on the SEPs compared to Mawhiba, but its significant improvement spearheaded by Mawhiba shows the success it has had.

The program is slowly growing and has not yet covered all gifted students. However, its impact on gifted students is evident as it helped 32% of the gifted students in the 2019–2020 school year. Enrollment into the program involves selection where the gifted kids are passed through other criteria. The reason for extra criteria is the limited classrooms and facilities available. While in the classrooms, the gifted students receive the normal curricular followed by an extra curricular that is based on their abilities. The extra curricular mainly focuses on STEM subjects and are taught after the normal curricular. Mawhiba works in conjunction with the Ministry of Education to improve the self-contained classroom programs. Mawhiba focuses on developing textbooks for the extra curricular education while the ministry focuses on adopting standards that are used in deciding on enriching the talented children.

The Ministry of Education has worked on improving educational standards for gifted children by offering gifted educational centers. The ministry currently has 91 educational centers, and the country has 94 school districts around the kingdom. The educational centers focus on research and problem-solving skills— the program aimed to serve at least 1% of students in each educational district.

Researchers have proposed the need for improving the educational programs from the limited educational context to a more social context. The suggestion has been termed as the differentiated paradigm where gifted children will be more involved in social programs. A differentiated program also aims at using the children's skills in social context so they can be well integrated with the society. Another important finding regarding the talented programs included a prevalence for teachers in the programs to be appreciated by the students compared to teachers in normal curricular. Teachers are also motivated when enrolled into such programs but improvements would be essential in the teaching methods. The country has been keen on gifted education and further changes are on the way with the help of Mawhiba and the Ministry of Education.

== Special education ==
Students with severe disabilities and autism are educated in special institutions. Students with less serious disabilities receive educational services at regular schools. Students with disabilities who attend regular schools might be partially mainstreamed, in which case they attend self-contained classrooms, or fully mainstreamed, in which case they learn in mainstream classrooms but may use special education services outside the classroom at times. However, not all schools offer mainstreaming. In the capital city of Riyadh, there are thirty inclusive elementary schools, eighteen inclusive middle schools, and eleven inclusive high schools.

Despite the prevalence of students with disabilities attending regular schools, general education teachers do not have much knowledge of working with students with autism, as they have received minimal training on this topic. A small study by Gibbs & Bozaid found that special education teachers in Saudi Arabia need more educational resources and professional development in order to successfully implement inclusive education practices.

A 2019 study by Alnahdi, et al., found that teachers in Saudi Arabia may agree with the inclusion of students with disabilities in mainstream classrooms, but they feel that the burden of ensuring that inclusion happens should be the responsibility of someone else. 62% of the teachers who participated felt that inclusive education would increase their workload.

Special education teachers work with students with disabilities, and they gain their qualifications through a four-year program in which they choose a specialization in a specific type of disability. Special education teachers are paid 30% more than mainstream classroom teachers. This pay increase has led to more students choosing special education as their major at university. As of 2020, there were more than 20 special education programs in Saudi Arabia.

In a study consisting of 1,100 special education major students at a university in Saudi Arabia, researchers found that 34% of participants did not want to teach for the rest of their careers. Female teacher candidates held a more positive view of teaching as a career. Additionally, students who chose special education as their first choice major were more likely to have positive views on teaching.

Students with disabilities in Saudi Arabia may use assistive technology (AT) such as smartboards, tablets, software, and computers to help them meet educational goals. Of eight teachers from the Makkah province surveyed, all believed that AT helps students with disabilities learn. Results found that AT also helps students with disabilities feel empowered, be motivated to complete assignments, and feel engaged.

Special education teachers work with students in planning for life post-school. Part of these transition services require schools to partner with local businesses, which help students' career development. In a 2021 survey of special education teachers in Riyadh, researchers found that special education teachers view these partnerships between schools and businesses positively, as the partnerships provide students with opportunities to volunteer, intern, and get general employment exposure. Most teachers surveyed believe that school-business partnerships help students improve social, communication, personal, and work skills. Another 2021 survey of special education teachers in Riyadh found that parents are not as involved in transition plans as they ought to be because schools do not provide them with enough guidance. Teachers also said that parents' busy lives and lack of knowledge on the importance of transition services are another barrier to parental participation. Additionally, schools do not have transition coordinators whose job it would be to help advise students on their transition plans. Instead, special education teachers are often required to take on this additional role.

In a 2020 survey of special education teachers and mainstream teachers in Riyadh, special education teachers viewed school culture and climate negatively when it came to collaborative leadership, respect for diversity, relationships, and collegial support and safe environment. 97.6% of special education teachers responded that their physical school buildings do not easily accommodate students with disabilities. Special education teachers additionally do not see principals and administrators as being knowledgeable and skillful in developing a positive school culture and climate. 74% of special education teachers perceive mainstream teachers in their schools as having negative views towards students with disabilities. However, smaller schools involved in the study were seen as having more positive culture and climate, while schools with more than 600 students were seen as having the most negative culture and climate.

== Private education ==
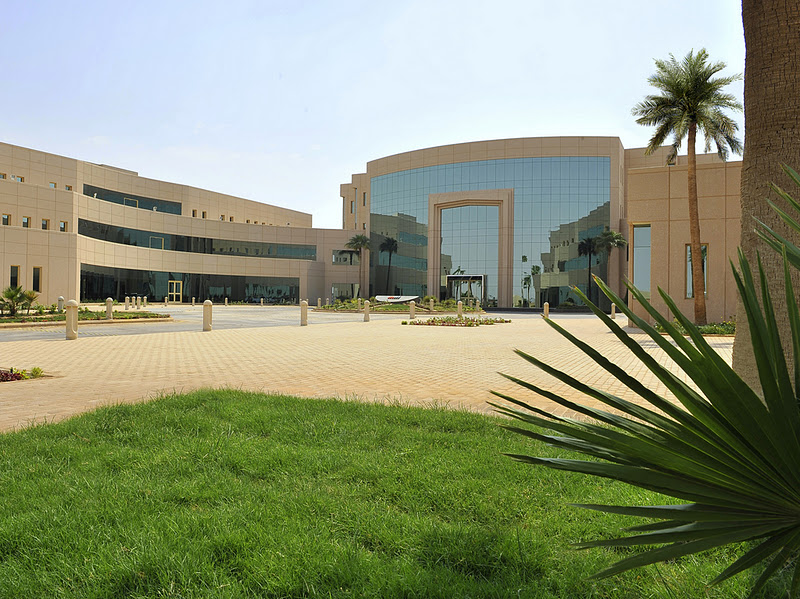
Al Yamamah University is a private university in Riyadh.

In Saudi Arabia, private education is one of the elements supporting governmental education at all education levels. The General Department for Private Education at the Ministry of Education supervises private schools for boys and private schools for girls and government provides private schools with free textbooks and an annual financial aid. Government also appoints and pays for a qualified director in every private school. According to UNESCO, in 2007, 48.9 percent of children enrolled in pre-primary schools, and 8.2 percent of children enrolled in primary school. As for the intermediate education, 6.4 percent of students enrolled in general programs were in private schools and 70.3 percent of students enrolled in technical and vocational programs were in private schools. As for the secondary education, 13.4 percent of students enrolled in general programs were in private schools and 61.6 percent of students enrolled in technical and vocational programs were in private schools. According to the World Bank, in 2004, 7.4 percent of students in tertiary education enrolled in private schools.

Before 2018, a large number of private schools (including international and foreign ones) were run in rented villas or buildings in several cities of the country. In April 2004, Asharq Al-Awsat reported that the education ministry crafted a plan to get rid of schools functioning in rented buildings by 2011. Several columnists and parents frequently expressed their displeasure and grievances regarding schools being run in villas and often asked the Saudi education authorities implement stringent rules for the same. In May 2013, the education ministry updated rules and regulations for schools operating in leased villas, instructing institution's authorities to ensure the premises strictly adhere to the building code and added that building owners and real estate companies were required to obtain approval prior to renting the premises to schools. In September 2013, Arab News reported that around 35% of the schools in Saudi Arabia were being operated in villa-turned campus buildings.

In June 2016, the education ministry led by Dr. Ahmed al-Issa stopped issuing licenses to private schools that did not have infrastructure designed for educational purposes and asked investors and stakeholders to shift their schools to educational buildings by 2018. In 2017, the education ministry announced that it would be closing down all the schools operating in rented buildings in Saudi Arabia despite the two-year deadline, prompting severe reactions from owners and investors which forced the ministry to review and subsequently rescind its decision. In May 2018, after reaching the deadline, the Saudi authorities closed down 113 schools across the country after they failed to shift their premises to buildings designed for educational purposes.

== International education ==
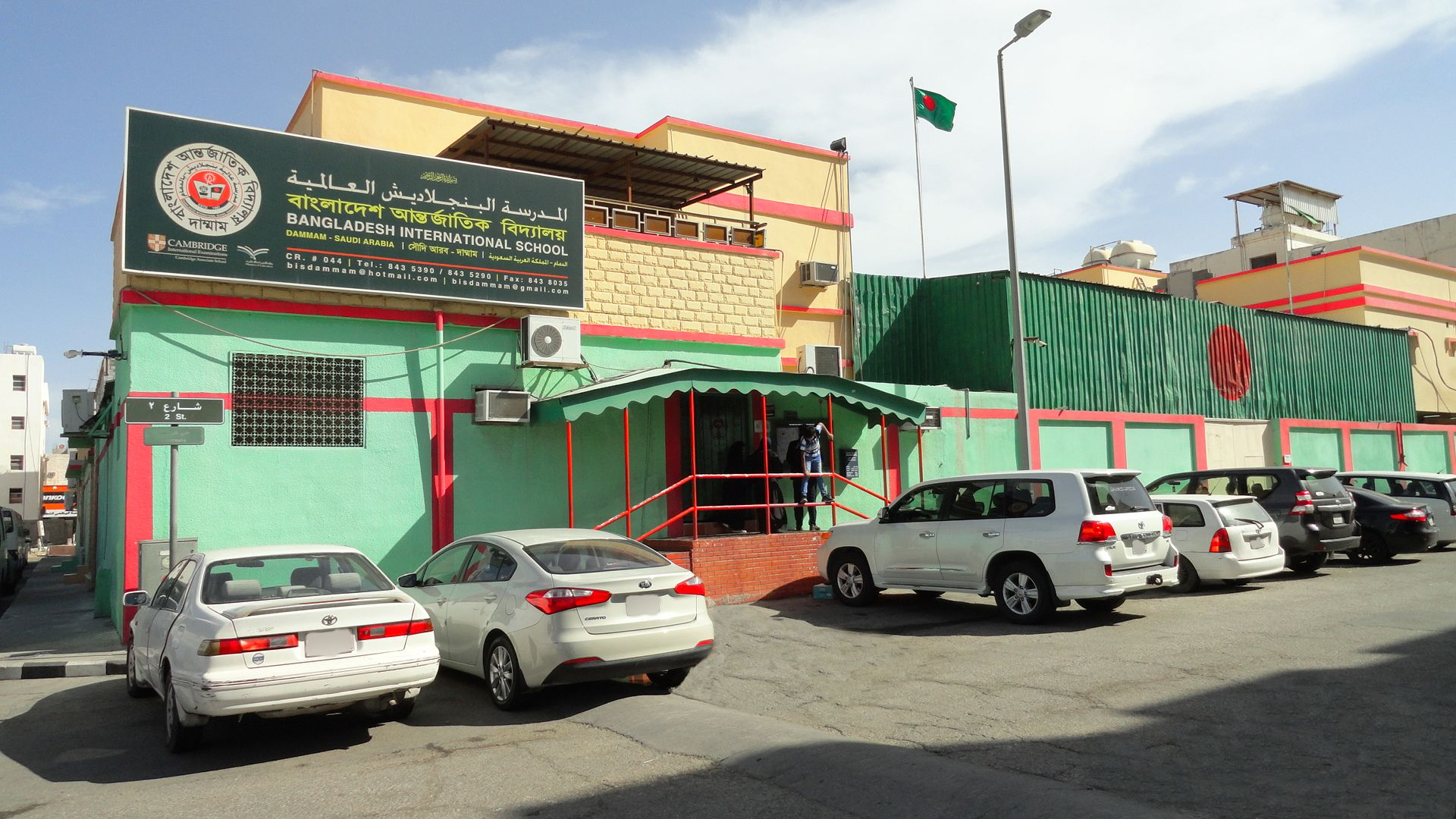
Bangladesh International School, Dammam

Saudi Arabia hosts almost 9 million foreign workers of various nationalities as of 2013, mostly from underdeveloped Asian and African countries. The Saudi government has granted permission to the diplomatic missions of the respective countries to operate community-based schools in the country to cater the educational needs of their children. According to the International Schools Statute issued by the Saudi Ministry of Education, schools implementing curricula other than Saudi ones are regarded as foreign schools. Foreign schools are further categorized as international schools who offer American or British curricula and community-based schools that teach national curricula of their home country and are run or sponsored by their respective diplomatic missions whereas being mostly owned by Saudi investors.

As of January 2015, the International Schools Consultancy (ISC) listed Saudi Arabia as having 203 international schools. ISC defines an 'international school' in the following terms "ISC includes an international school if the school delivers a curriculum to any combination of pre-school, primary or secondary students, wholly or partly in English outside an English-speaking country, or if a school in a country where English is one of the official languages, offers an English-medium curriculum other than the country's national curriculum and is international in its orientation." This definition is used by publications including The Economist.

In Saudi Arabia some international schools are owned by communities of foreign nationals, while others are private schools owned by individuals with Saudi citizenship.

The Saudi government limits community schools to one per locality or city per nationality; diplomatic missions either supervise or directly operate the community schools. These community schools are not required to separate male and female students into separate campuses and are allowed to host social activities with men and women mixed. They are not required to have Saudi citizens as sponsors since the Saudi authorities consider the schools to be under the sponsorship of the diplomatic missions. Czarina Valerie A. Regis and Allan B. de Guzman, authors of "A system within a system: the Philippine schools overseas," wrote that the Saudi Ministry of Education "still exercises restraint in implementing its regulatory functions" on community schools.

There may be more than one private school per nationality per city: the number of private schools that may be established is dependent upon the number of Saudi nationals willing to open a school in that city. Unlike community international schools, private international schools are required to follow Saudi regulations, including those related to gender segregation.

The British International School, Riyadh teaches from foundation one to high school. Over 80% of its students are British nationals, and the school follows the British curriculum.

=== Philippine schools ===
As of February 2006 about 75% of the Philippine international schools represented by the Commission on Filipinos Overseas (CFO) were located in Saudi Arabia. Community-owned Philippine schools, including the International Philippine School in Al Khobar (IPSA), the International Philippine School in Jeddah (IPSJ), and International Philippine School in Riyadh (IPSR), were by 2006 managed by independent school boards but were initially managed by the diplomatic missions themselves. As of 2006 Riyadh has 13 Philippine private schools and Jeddah has five Philippine private schools.

Large numbers of Philippine children came to Saudi after many Filipino workers arrived in Saudi Arabia in the 1980s. The first Philippine school in Saudi Arabia, Philippine School in Jeddah was established after the Philippine Consulate in Jeddah began making efforts to start a school in 1983, and Philippine schools were later established in Riyadh and other Saudi cities. In 2000 Saudi Arabia had nine accredited Philippine schools. By 2005 Jeddah alone had four Philippine international schools, with two more scheduled to open shortly. By 2006 there were 21 Philippine schools recognized by the CFO, reflecting a 133% growth rate from 2000. Regis and Guzman stated that in private Philippine schools multiple Saudi rules that are not consistent with the culture of the Philippines are enforced.

== Literacy ==
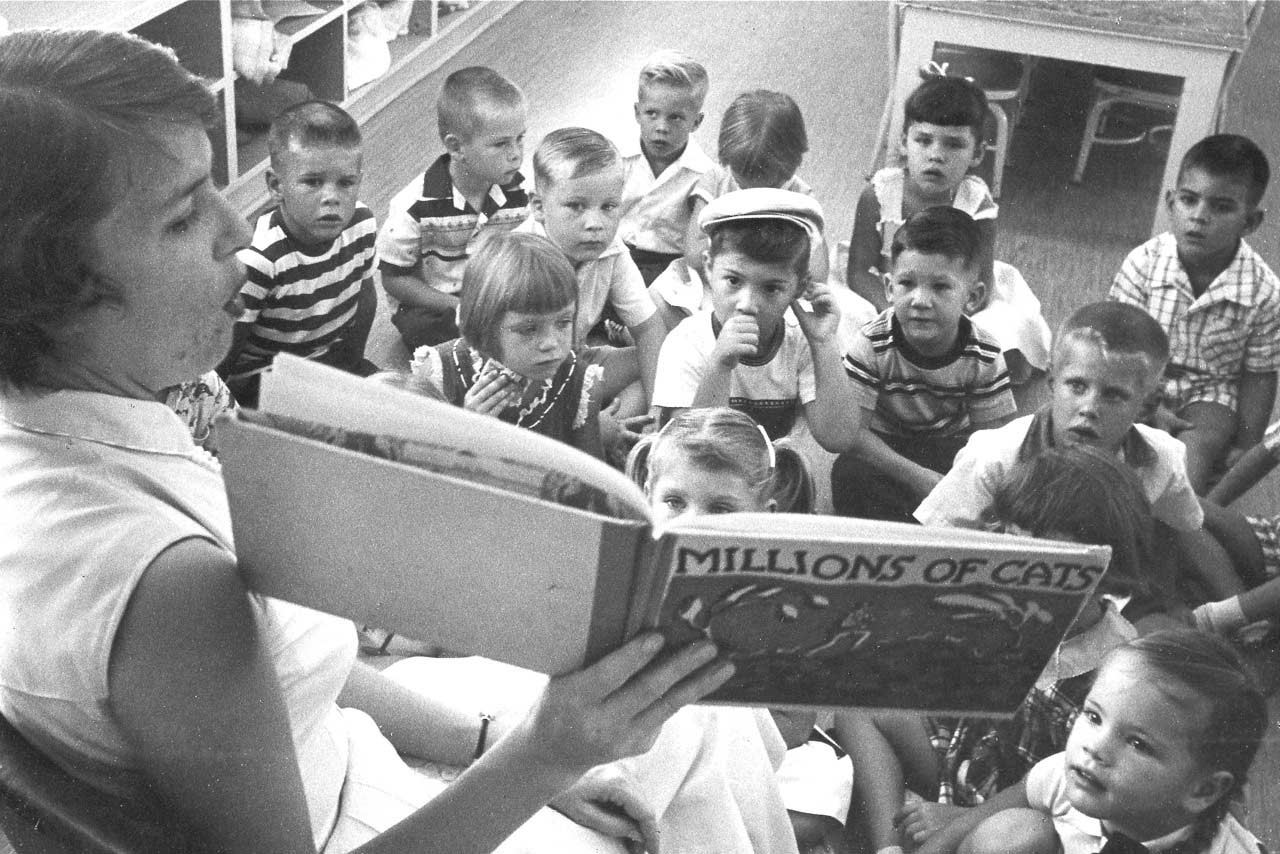
A teacher reading to students at Dhahran Elementary School in 1957

According to the results of the demographic survey conducted by the General Authority for Statistics, Ministry of Economy and Planning in 2007 the incidence of illiteracy among the Saudi population was 13.7%. The illiteracy rate stood at 1.4% for the age group 10 to 14 years, while the highest level in the age group between the ages of 65 and more than 509,573 people to the rate of 73.9%. With regard to the spread of illiteracy among Saudi Administrative Regions, as the study showed a large disparity between the regions of the Kingdom, while the figure for both sexes was at its lowest level in the Riyadh region, at 9.9%, the highest level was found in the Jizan area at 23.5%, and the lowest rate of illiteracy among males was in Riyadh region, as the minimum rate of 5.1% and in Jizan higher rate of 14.8%, while the lowest rate of illiteracy of Saudi women was in the eastern region at 14.7% and the highest rate was in the region of Jizan at 31.6%.

According to the World Bank, there is gender disparity in the literacy rate. In 2007, 85.0 percent of adult (people ages 15 and above) were literate and 98.1 percent of youth (people ages 15–24) were literate, 89.1 percent of male adults were literate and 79.4 percent of female adults were literate. As for youth literacy rate (people ages 15–24), 97.0 percent were literate, 98.1 percent of male youths were literate, and 95.9 percent of female youths were literate.

One of the World Bank reports suggested the relatively high adult literacy rate of Saudi Arabia, considering the continued low level of primary enrollment, derived from the successful use of religious organizations, particularly local mosques and local religious institutions such as Koranic schools for the provision of ancillary educational services, which is a trend of particular note in the MENA region.

== King Abdullah Project for General Education Development ==
The King Abdullah Project for General Education Development is a SR9 billion (US$2.4bn) project to be implemented over the next six years to create a skilled and work force for the future. A number of schools in Jeddah, Riyadh and Dammam have been selected for the implementation of this project. More than 400,000 teachers will be trained for the new program. In addition, this project will emphasize extracurricular activities for the purpose of developing intellectual, creative and communicative skills.

== Criticism of the Saudi education system and reform proposals ==
The Saudi education system has been criticised. One observation was, "The country needs educated young Saudis with marketable skills and a capacity for innovation and entrepreneurship. That's not generally what Saudi Arabia's educational system delivers, steeped as it is in rote learning and religious instruction."

The study of Islam dominates the Saudi educational system. In particular, the memorization by rote of large parts of the Qu'ran, its interpretation and understanding (Tafsir) and the application of Islamic tradition to everyday life is at the core of the curriculum. Religion taught in this manner is also a compulsory subject for all university students. Saudi youth "generally lacks the education and technical skills the private sector needs". Similarly, The Chronicle of Higher Education wrote in 2010 that "the country needs educated young Saudis with marketable skills and a capacity for innovation and entrepreneurship. That's not generally what Saudi Arabia's educational system delivers, steeped as it is in rote learning and religious instruction." Indeed, such control has stifled critical thought, and as a result, the education system does not necessarily foster innovation and creativity, both of which are essential to development. Saudi education has also been strongly criticized for promoting intolerance, including antisemitic views, anti-Christian rhetoric, and referring to non-Muslims as "infidels", enemies of God, and enemies of all Muslims.

The religious sector of the Saudi national curriculum was examined in a 2006 report by Freedom House which concluded that "the Saudi public school religious curriculum continues to propagate an ideology of hate toward the 'unbeliever', that is, Christians, Jews, Shiites, Sufis, Sunni Muslims who do not follow Wahhabi doctrine, Hindus, atheists and others". The Saudi religious studies curriculum is taught outside the kingdom via Saudi-linked madrasah, schools, and clubs throughout the world. Critics have described the education system as "medieval" and that its primary goal "is to maintain the rule of absolute monarchy by casting it as the ordained protector of the faith, and that Islam is at war with other faiths and cultures".

The consequence of this approach is considered by some, including perhaps the Saudi government itself, to have encouraged Islamist terrorism. To tackle the twin problems of extremism and the inadequacy of the country's university education, the government is aiming to modernise the education system through the Tatweer reform program. The Tatweer program is reported to have a budget of approximately US$2 billion and focuses on moving teaching away from the traditional Saudi methods of memorization and rote learning towards encouraging students to analyze and problem-solve as well as creating a more secular and vocationally based education system.

A comprehensive Human Rights Watch review of the Education Ministry-produced school religion books for the 2016–17 school year found that some of the content that first provoked widespread controversy for violent and intolerant teachings in the aftermath of the September 11, 2001 attacks remains in the texts today, despite Saudi officials' promises to eliminate the intolerant language. The texts disparage Sufi and Shia religious practices and label Jews and Christians "unbelievers" with whom Muslims should not associate.

In 2021, The Washington Post newspaper published a report on the measures taken by Saudi Arabia to clean textbooks from paragraphs considered anti-Semitic and anti-women. The paragraphs dealing with the punishment of homosexuality or same-sex relations have been deleted, and expressions of admiration for the extremist martyrdom. Anti-Semitic expressions and calls to fight the Jews became fewer. David Weinberg, director of international affairs for the Anti-Defamation League in Washington, said that references to demonizing Jews, Christians and Shiites have been removed from some places or have toned down, noting the deletion of paragraphs that talk about killing gays, infidels and witches. The US State Department expressed in an email that it welcomed the changes to the materials affecting Saudi educational curricula. The Foreign Ministry supports a training program for Saudi teachers.

Other criticism of the Saudi education system have also come from a local level, raising business concerns regarding the ability of Saudi graduates to be able to compete in the global economy. Many of these criticism point out the fact that the current economic development in the region can not be supported by traditional Arab educational culture that emphasizes on rote learning. The wide implementation of the English language in the education system is especially seen as an important reform that must happen, as it is the lingua franca used in large multi-national oil and gas companies.

== See also ==
- List of universities and colleges in Saudi Arabia
- Educational technology in Saudi Arabia
- Libraries in Saudi Arabia
- Najd National Schools
- Youth in Saudi Arabia
- Women's education in Saudi Arabia
