= Arabian Journal for Science and Engineering =

Scientific journal

- Discipline: Natural sciences, engineering
- Language: English, Arabic
- Edited by: Bassam El Ali

Publication details
- History: 1975–present
- Publisher: Springer
- Frequency: Monthly
- Impact factor: 2.9 (2024)

Standard abbreviations
- ISO 4: Arab. J. Sci. Eng.

Indexing
- CODEN: AJSEBW
- ISSN: 2193-567X (print); 2191-4281 (web)

Links
- Journal homepage; Online access; Online archive

The Arabian Journal for Science and Engineering is a peer-reviewed scientific journal published monthly by Springer Science+Business Media on behalf of King Fahd University of Petroleum and Minerals. It covers developments in all branches of natural sciences and engineering. Established in 1975, the journal was split into three parts devoted to sciences, engineering and theme issues in 1996. The journals were merged in 2011. Its current editor-in-chief is Bassam El Ali (King Fahd University of Petroleum and Minerals).

== Abstracting and indexing ==
The journal is abstracted and indexed in:

- Current Contents/Engineering, Computing & Technology
- EBSCO
- Inspec
- ProQuest databases
- Science Citation Index Expanded
- Scopus
- zbMATH Open

According to the Journal Citation Reports, the journal has a 2024 impact factor of 2.9.
