= Educational technology in Saudi Arabia =

This article describes the history of using educational technology in Saudi Arabia. It highlights the history of using educational technology in the Kingdom of Saudi Arabia since the mid-1700s, the beginning, the improvements and the current status. It also describes the rapid increase in using technology in schools, institutes and universities, and presents the attitudes of Saudi people towards this global phenomenon.

== Timeline of education and technology in Saudi Arabia ==
Education in Saudi Arabia has gone through diverse stages. Regarding the technology emergence in Education in Saudi Arabia, it is displayed below that technology has emerged just recently.

=== Emergence of education in Saudi Arabia ===
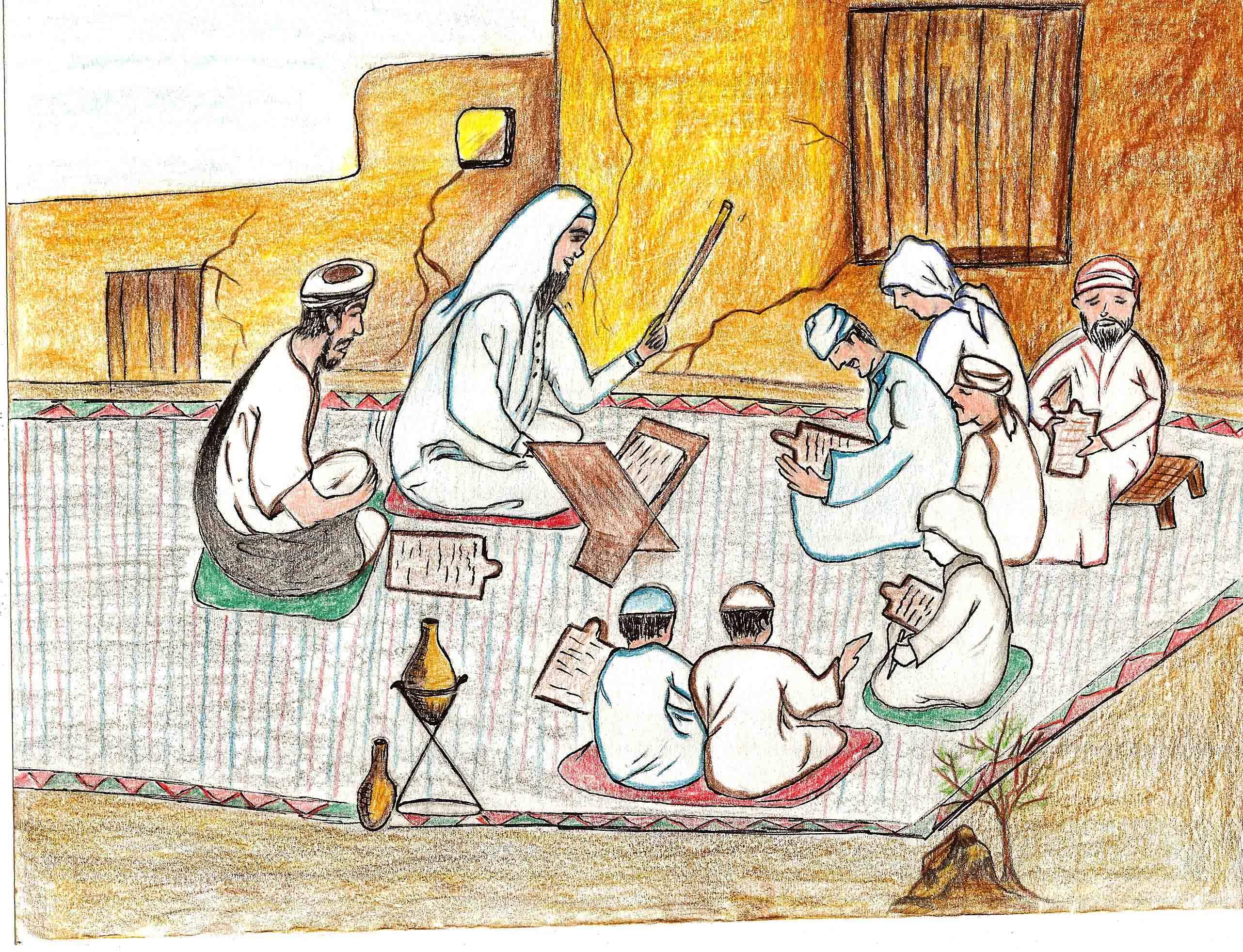
Saudi Kuttab (elementary school) teaching

1. In 1930s, formal primary education began in Saudi Arabia.
2. In 1945, King Abdulaziz bin Abdelrahman Al-Saud, the country's founder, had initiated an extensive program to establish schools in the kingdom.
3. In 1954, the Ministry of Education was established.

=== Emergence of technical education in Saudi Arabia ===
1. In the early 1950s, technical education and vocational training in Saudi Arabia started and was integrated with general education.
2. In 1980, General Organization for Technical Education and Vocational Training (GOTEVOT) was formally established. It acknowledged the need for technological education at the college level to generate highly qualified national cadres.

Learning Resources Centre

=== Pre-internet technology and education in Saudi Arabia ===
1. In 1979, Saudi radio channels broadcast radio education programs with support from the Ministry of Higher Education and the Ministry of Education. Although not official distance-learning programs, these radio programs were designed to assist students in the traditional learning system.
2. In around 1980, correspondence education started when students participated in courses provided by international universities outside the kingdom.
3. In 1985, Saudi Arabia and other Arab countries launched two communications satellites called ArabSat....Their use in...education is limited only by the imagination and resources of the user.

=== Post-internet technology and education in Saudi Arabia ===
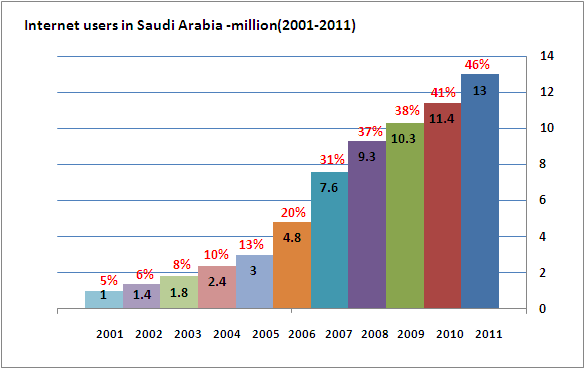
The number and percentage of the population of internet users in Saudi Arabia (2001–2011)

1. In 1993, King Fahd University of Petroleum and Minerals (KFUPM) in Dhahran becomes the first Saudi institution to connect to the internet.
2. In 1994, Internet was first introduced to Kingdom of Saudi Arabia when state academic, medical and research institutions got access to it.
3. In 1997, public access to Internet was allowed.
4. In 1999, the Internet was provided for college and government use. Then, Internet access begins the move from government and academic into the mainstream. Though the first few years did not notice much progress, but in following years, Internet subscription and use increased rapidly.
5. In 2000, Al-Sharhan suggested that a country like Saudi Arabia with a land area of over 2 million square kilometers and a population of 16 million should consider the adoption of the use of satellite technology in its educational system. In addition, the general public was granted Internet access.
6. In the early 21st century, Saudi universities use Interactive Television Technology (ITT) transmitted via fiber optic lines- a technology that provides visual and auditory communication to students in remote area who are seeking an education.
7. In 2001, King Abdul Aziz City of Science and Technology (KACST) decided to fund a study that will explore the use of Internet along three major topics: .... Implications of the Internet technology for education .... Also, Saudi Telecom Company (STC) introduced asymmetric digital subscriber line (ADSL) service for the kingdom, which significantly reduced the cost of the Internet service. ADSL made it possible for all the universities to implement more web-based instruction (WBI).
8. In 2002, Saudi Arabia's nationwide educational system consisted of 11 universities, over 24.000 schools, 48 women's colleges, and over 30 colleges.

=== Emergence of e-learning ===
1. In 2003, Aum Alqura University and King Fahad University of Petroleum and Minerals calibrated to establish e-learning center under the deanery of academic development to be the main task help academic population in university to benefit from learning technology to develop the process of education.
1. Starting from 2006, there is a significant development in E-learning in Saudi Arabia.
2. In 2007, National Center for E-learning and Distance Learning was established. Also, Saudi television channels broadcast educational programs with assistance from the Ministry of Higher Education and the Ministry of Education. As with the use of radio offerings, those programs are not official distance learning, but they are presented to help students who are in the traditional learning system.
3. In 2008, Al-Harbi (2011) stated that e-learning in Saudi Arabia is still in its infancy with a paucity of information on its use at the time of the study. Saudi Arabia called for a national plan to adopt information technology across the country. The plan recommends implementation of e-learning and distance learning, and their prospective applications in higher education.
4. In 2009, the first international conference e-learning and distance learning was held and organized by the Ministry of Higher Education and National Center for E-learning and Distance Learning.
5. In 2010, the list of distance education in higher education institutions in the Kingdom of Saudi Arabia was officially published and ratified.
6. In 2011, The King Abdullah Ibn Abdul-Aziz Al Saud, the Premier and the Chairman of Higher Education Council, has approved the council's decision on the establishment of Saudi Electronic University.
7. In the school year 2011–2012, there were first distance education graduate students of King Abdulaziz University among Saudi universities.

== Internet connection for everyone ==
=== Recent statistics ===
The number of the internet users grew from around million in 2001 to an estimated 13 million at the end of 9 M 2011.

== See also ==
- Education in Saudi Arabia
- Technical and Vocational Training Corporation (TVTC)
