= Saud bin Khalid Al Saud =

Saudi royal and government official

Deputy Governor of the Saudi Arabian General Investment Authority (SAGIA)
- In office: December 2010 – April 2017
Names
- Saud bin Khalid bin Faisal bin Abdulaziz Al Saud
- House: Al Saud
- Father: Khalid bin Faisal Al Saud
- Mother: Al Anoud bint Abdullah bin Mohammad bin Abdul Rahman Al Saud
- Education: King Fahd University of Petroleum and Minerals

Saud bin Khalid bin Faisal Al Saud (Arabic: سعود بن خالد آل سعود), also known as Saud bin Khalid Al Faisal, is the former deputy governor of Saudi Arabian General Investment Authority (SAGIA) and a member of House of Saud. From 2017 to 2026 he was deputy governor of Al Madinah Region.

== Early life and education ==
Prince Saud is the third son of Khalid bin Faisal Al Saud. He is the brother of Prince Bandar and Prince Sultan. Their mother is Al Anoud bint Abdullah bin Mohammad bin Abdul Rahman Al Saud.

Saud bin Khalid received a Bachelor of Science degree in finance from King Fahd University of Petroleum and Minerals in 2001.

== Professional experience ==
Since April 2017, Saud bin Khalid has been the deputy governor of Al Madinah Al Munawarrah province of Saudi Arabia. From December 2010 to April 2017, Saud bin Khalid served as deputy governor for investment affairs of the Saudi Arabian General Investment Authority (SAGIA) and was the head of investment affairs department, which was responsible for managing the investment environment and competitiveness agenda of Saudi Arabia. The department focused on establishing a more liberal investment conditions in the Kingdom. As part of these efforts, he also chaired the Saudi negotiation team for bilateral investment treaties. Saud bin Khalid was also vice chairman of the Saudi's joint economic commissions with Switzerland, Russia, Uzbekistan, Kazakhstan, Greece, Azerbaijan, and Senegal.

He was also named the president of the National Competitiveness Center (NCC) in December 2010. The NCC was established by Saudi Arabian General Investment Authority in 2006 to act as an independent body to monitor, assess and support the enhancement of competitiveness in the Kingdom. The NCC fulfills this role by serving as a think tank, facilitator and communicator of change. He was also a board member of the Saudi Industrial Property Authority (MODON).

He also served in the positions of chief operations officer for Investment Affairs at Saudi Arabian General Investment Authority (SAGIA) and NCC from January 2009 to December 2010, chief financial officer for Investment Affairs at SAGIA and NCC from July 2008 to January 2009, and financial analyst at Saudi Aramco from May 2001 to July 2008.

Saud bin Khalid was based in the Treasury Department and worked in a number of departments including Internal Auditing, New Business Development and other financial and planning related departments.

== Personal life ==
Prince Saud married a daughter of Khalid bin Saud bin Khalid Al Abdul Rahman in 2010.

== Membership ==
Saud bin Khalid is a member of the following organizations: Global Federation of Competitive Councils; Board of trustees of the King Faisal Foundation; several government commissions and several regional investment councils.
