= Bandar bin Khalid Al-Faisal =

Saudi royal and businessman (born 1965)

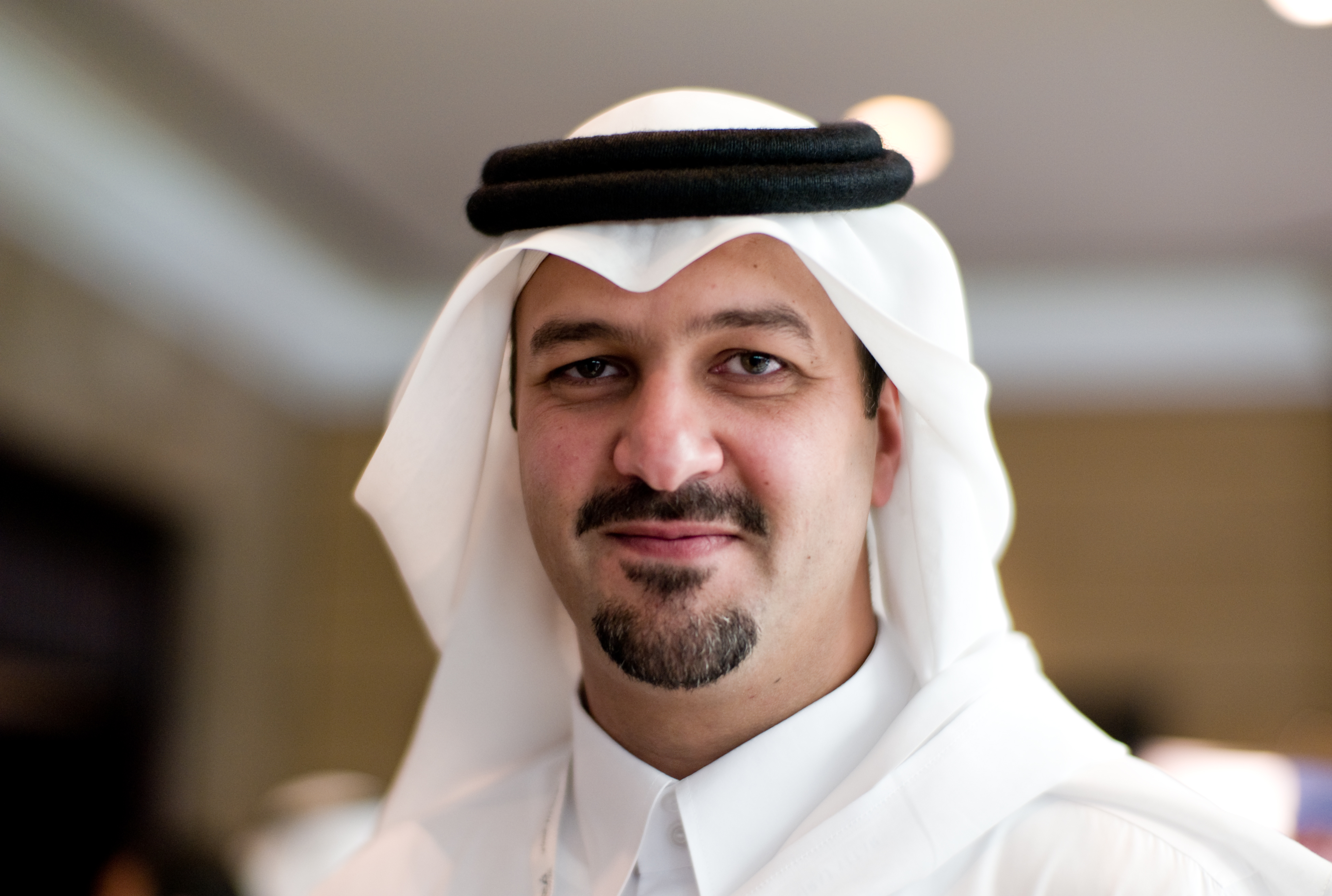
- Prince Bandar in 2007
- Born: 1965 (age 60–61)
- Spouse: Princess Nouf bint Mohammed
- Issue: Prince Khalid; Princess Louloah; Prince Faisal; Princess Haya
Names
- Bandar bin Khalid bin Faisal bin Abdulaziz bin Abdul Rahman Al Saud
- House: Al Saud
- Father: Khalid bin Faisal Al Saud
- Mother: Al Anoud bint Abdullah bin Mohammad bin Abdul Rahman Al Saud
- Education: King Fahd University of Petroleum and Minerals; Tufts University

Bandar bin Khalid bin Faisal Al Saud (Arabic: بندر بن خالد آل سعود; born 1965), better known as Bandar bin Khalid Al-Faisal, is a Saudi prince and businessman. He is a minister-ranking advisor at the Royal Court and chairman of Advanced Media Holding Company (AMHC), a media group parenting an FM radio station and Al Watan.

== Early life and education ==
Bandar bin Khalid was born in 1965. He is the eldest son of Khalid bin Faisal Al Saud and the brother of Sultan bin Khalid Al Faisal and Saud bin Khalid Al Faisal. Their mother is Al Anoud bint Abdullah bin Mohammad bin Abdul Rahman Al Saud.

Bandar bin Khalid received a computer science degree from King Fahd University of Petroleum and Minerals in Dhahran in 1988. He then continued his education, receiving a master of arts degree in international business management from the Fletcher School of Tufts University in 2005. He also attended several courses in the field of executive management, and has more than “4000” flight hours.

== Career ==
Bandar bin Khalid is the chairman of the board of directors of Assir Foundation for publishing and printing, publisher of Al Watan newspaper. He is also the chairman of Investments Enterprises. He is co-founder and a member of the board of trustees of the Arab Thought Foundation, which works to promote better understanding between Arabs and the Western world. He is also deputy managing director of the King Faisal Foundation. He is founder and chairman of the board of directors of Alttmir Company Ltd., and Sama Airlines, He is a member of the board of directors of the Arab House, and Harvey Nichols Riyadh, as well as a managing director and board member of the Saudi Aviation Club. He was appointed vice president of Painting and Patronage in 2010.

Prince Bandar was named as a royal consultant in June 2017. He is also the chairman of the Jockey Club Saudi Arabia.

He is also President of Saudi Climbing and Hiking Federation

== Personal life ==
Prince Bandar is married to Nouf bint Mohammed bin Abdullah bin Mohammed Al Saud, with whom he has four children: Khalid, Louloah, Faisal, and Haya.
