= Khaled S. Al-Sultan =

Khaled S. Al-Sultan (born 1 January 1963 in Al Qasim, Saudi Arabia) was the fourth rector of King Fahd University for Petroleum and Minerals (KFUPM) a public university in Dhahran, Saudi Arabia and the first to have graduated from the institution to hold this position. Al-Sultan is married and has two children.

== Education ==
- Ph.D. in Industrial and Operations Engineering (Operation Research), The University of Michigan, Ann Arbor, U.S.A., 1990.
- M.S. in Mathematics (Applied Mathematics), The University of Michigan, Ann Arbor, U.S.A., 1990.
- M.S. in Systems Engineering, King Fahd University of Petroleum and Minerals (KFUPM), Dhahran, Saudi Arabia, January 1987.
- B.S. (with Highest Honor) in Systems Engineering, KFUPM, January 1985
