= Muhammad M. Al-Saggaf =

President of King Fahd University of Petroleum and Minerals

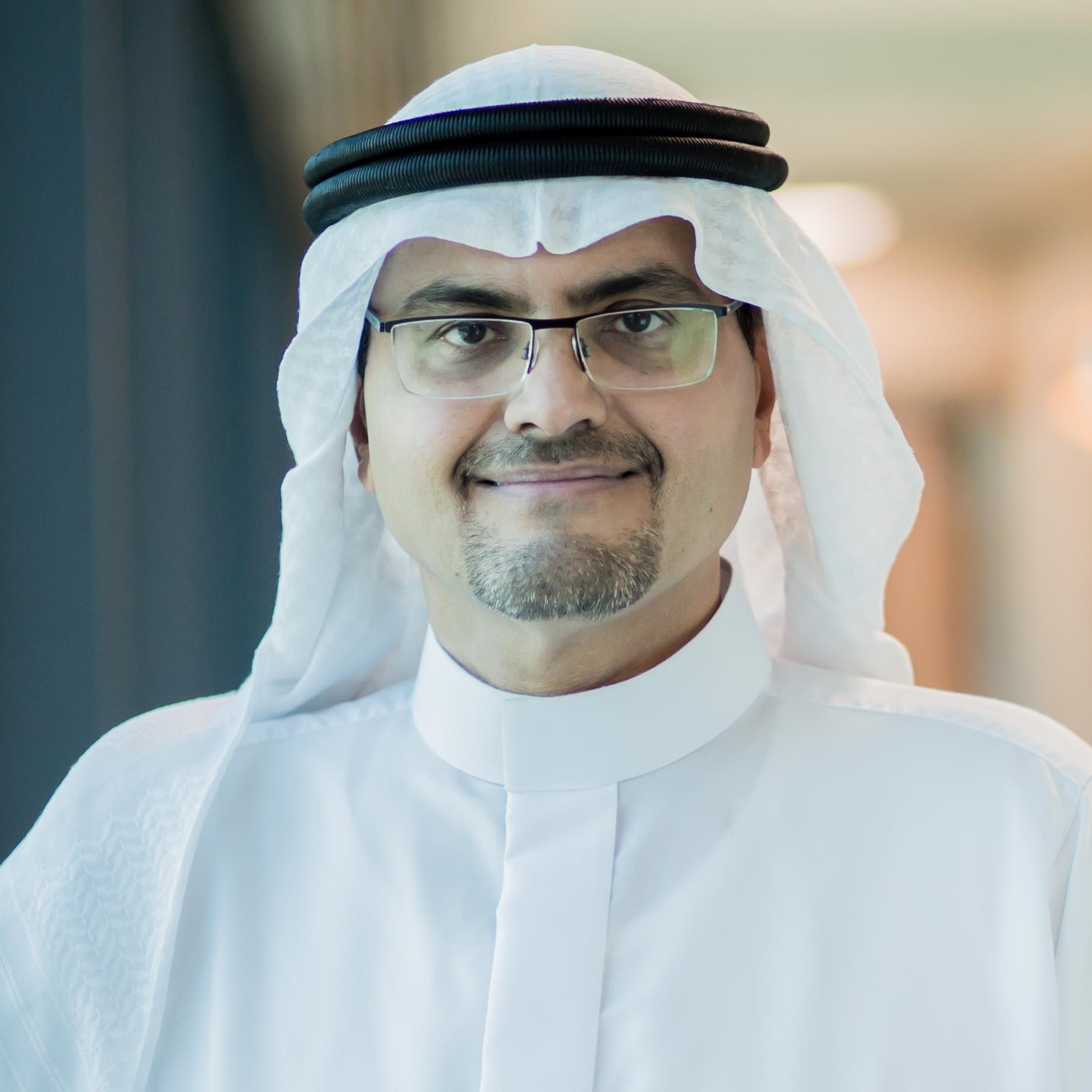

6th President of King Fahd University of Petroleum and Minerals
- Incumbent
- Assumed office January 2020
- Preceded by: Sahel N. Abduljauwad

Personal details
- Education: King Fahd University of Petroleum and Minerals (B.S.); Massachusetts Institute of Technology (M.S.) and (PhD); King Fahd University of Petroleum and Minerals (MBA)
- Awards: J. Clarence Karcher Award from the Society of Exploration Geophysicists (SEG); Lester C. Uren Technical Excellence Award from the Society of Petroleum Engineers (SPE); Distinguished Member Award from the Society of Petroleum Engineers (SPE); Eisenhower Fellowship
- Scientific career
- Fields: Mathematics; Geophysics; Petroleum Engineering
- Institutions: King Fahd University of Petroleum and Minerals; Saudi Aramco

Muhammad Al-Saggaf is the 6th President of King Fahd University of Petroleum and Minerals (KFUPM). He brought a wealth of industry experience to the role, having spent the bulk of his career in the industry before returning to academia. He started his career at KFUPM then spent 30 years at Saudi Aramco, culminating in his position as Senior Vice President of Operations and Business Services for six years, before re-joining the University in January, 2020. He is credited with moving KFUPM from a rank of #200 worldwide in 2020 into #63 in 2027, and opening admission for women, whose enrollment reached 40-50% from nil.

== Early life and education ==
Born in Jeddah, Saudi Arabia, Al-Saggaf moved after high school to the Eastern Province to attend King Fahd University of Petroleum and Minerals, from which he earned a B.S. degree in Mathematics. He later earned M.S. and Ph.D. degrees in Geophysics from the Massachusetts Institute of Technology, and an MBA from KFUPM. He is also a graduate of Harvard Business School’s Program for Management Development.

== Career ==
He worked for 30 years in Saudi Aramco, moving through the ranks from a junior geophysicist to the rank of senior vice president, second only to the company's president.

== Awards ==
He has received international recognition in Geoscience and Petroleum Engineering, including the J. Clarence Karcher Award from the Society of Exploration Geophysicists (SEG), the Lester C. Uren Technical Excellence Award, and the Distinguished Member Award from the Society of Petroleum Engineers (SPE), the Eisenhower Fellowship., and the LEWAS women empowerment award.

== KFUPM Transformation ==
KFUPM was spun off by the government and became independent in 2020. This was the time at which Al-Saggaf was brought in as president to lead a broad transformation of the university. Some of the key changes at KFUPM include the following:

Improved the global ranking from #200 in 2020 to #63 globally, and to Top-100 globally in all Engineering disciplines: Petroleum #4, Minerals & Mining #15, Civil & Structural #51, Chemical #58, Mechanical & Astronautical #73, and Electrical #73. Moreover, it has been recognized by the National Academy of Inventors as #2 worldwide in US granted patents, ahead of well established universities such as Stanford and Harvard.

Introduced the AI+X^{®} platform (train students on Artificial Intelligence then build their major on it). All academic programs since 2020 are based on this platform, which includes courses in AI + Machine Learning, Data Science + Big Data, Business + Entrepreneurship, and Career Essentials for all students.

Launched over 100 new programs in future-facing disciplines, including: 45 industry-focused interdisciplinary master’s programs to help expand the global economic base, in artificial intelligence, cybersecurity, renewable energy, smart cities, nuclear engineering, etc.; Eight undergraduate departments and programs, including Control & Instrumentation Engineering, Materials Science & Engineering, Bioengineering, Environmental Science & Engineering, Smart & Sustainable Cities, Integrated Design, Electrical Engineering and physics, and mining science & engineering; 43 undergraduate interdisciplinary concentrations (CX) in key sectors, such as renewables, hydrogen mobility, non-metallics, quantum computing, nuclear power, etc.

Increased the number of post-doctoral fellows (postdocs) several folds, and increased the number of graduate students from 12% to 40% of the student population, and their diversity to 80+ countries from a very limited number of countries of origin previously. Also, changed the graduate program to allow direct admission to the PhD, in line with the practices of top international universities.

He oversaw the opening of undergraduate and graduate programs at KFUPM to female students. Female students were admitted through a merit-based process, with women comprising 40-50% of the engineering intake. During this period, the university increased the recruitment of female faculty and professionals across various colleges, beyond roles previously limited to the clinic.
