= Order of the Montenegrin Grand Star =

Montenegro order

Order of the Montenegrin Grand Star Orden Crnogorske velike zvijezde
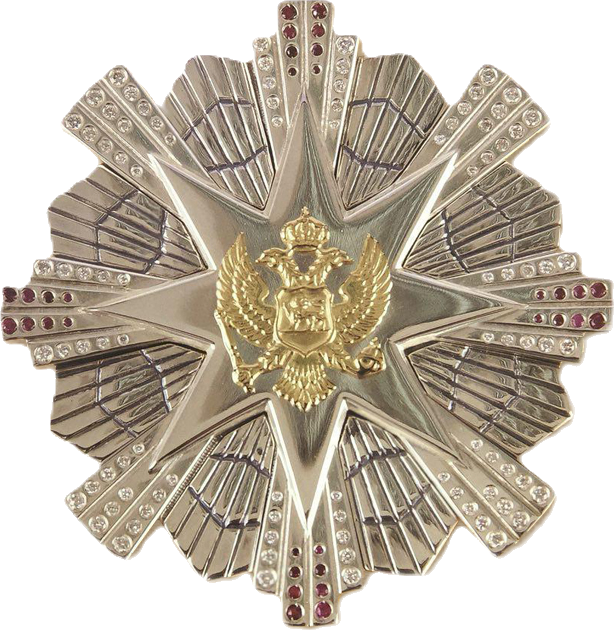

Awarded by Montenegro
- Type: State order
- Eligibility: Montenegrin and foreign citizens
- Status: Active

Statistics
- First induction: 2006

Precedence
- Next (higher): Order of the Republic of Montenegro
- Next (lower): Order of Montenegrin independence
- ribbon bar

Order of the Montenegrin Grand Star (Montenegrin: Orden Crnogorske velike zvijezde) is the second highest state order of Montenegro. The order is awarded by the President of Montenegro.

It is awarded for special merits in developing and strengthening cooperation and friendly relations between the Republic of Montenegro and other countries and international organizations and for contributing to the international reputation and influence of Montenegro.

== Notable recipients ==
- 2026 – (Sovereign Military Order of Malta) John T. Dunlap
- 2025 – (Montenegro) Amfilohije Radović (posthumously)
- 2022 – (San Marino) Oscar Mina
- 2022 – (San Marino) Paolo Rondelli
- 2021 – (Montenegro) Radivoje Brajović
- 2018 – (United States) Joe Biden
- 2017 – Queen Rania of Jordan
- 2016 – (Slovakia) Miroslav Lajčák
- 2015 – (Serbia) Zoran Đinđić (posthumously)
- 2013 – (United Arab Emirates) Mohamed bin Zayed Al Nahyan
- 2010 – (Saudi Arabia) Khalid bin Faisal Al Saud
- 2009 – (United States) Richard Sklar

== See also ==
- Orders, decorations, and medals of Montenegro
