= KFUPM Program of Industrial and Systems Engineering =

Bachelor of Science degree, Saudi Arabia

The Industrial & Systems Engineering Program offers a Bachelor of Science degree in industrial engineering at the King Fahd University of Petroleum & Minerals (KFUPM) in the Kingdom of Saudi Arabia. With a total of 133 credit hours, the program covers the major areas of industrial engineering, such as operations research, production planning, inventory control, methods engineering, quality control, facility location, manufacturing, and facility layout.

== History ==
The Industrial & Systems Engineering (ISE) program in the Systems Engineering Department was first introduced in 1984 and has been revised in 1996 based on the Accreditation Board for Engineering and Technology (ABET) recommendation after their first visit in 1993. The revision made in 1996 came after when the number of credit hours of the Bachelor of Science (B.Sc) was reduced from 141 to 133 credit hours. The program has received ABET accreditation extension in 2010.

== Program courses ==
The ISE program has a total of 50 credit hours on required ISE courses, with the following descriptions:

- Introduction to I&SE
- Probability & Statistics
- Regression for Industrial Engineering
- Linear Control Systems
- Numerical Methods
- Operations Research I
- Statistical Quality Control
- Principles of Industrial Costing
- Engineering Economics
- Manufacturing Technology
- Work and Process Improvement
- Fundamental of Database Systems
- Seminar
- Industrial Engineering Design
- Production Systems
- Stochastic Systems Simulation
- Operations Research II
- Facility Layout and Location
- Senior Design
