= Ali Abdullah Al-Daffa =

- Born: علي بن عبدالله الدفـّاع; 1943 (1362 H); Unaizah (Al Gassim, Saudi Arabia)
- Education: Stephen F. Austin State University, East Texas State University, Vanderbilt University

Ali Abdullah Al-Daffa (Arabic: علي بن عبدالله الدفـّاع) (born 1943 (1362 H) in Unaizah, Al Gassim, Saudi Arabia) is a mathematician, scientist, author, professor, and expert on the history of science and Islam.

He obtained his Bachelor of Science degree from Stephen F. Austin State University in 1967, his Master of Science degree from East Texas State University in 1968, and his PhD from Peabody College of Vanderbilt University in 1972.

Upon receiving his PhD, Al-Daffa joined King Fahd University of Petroleum and Minerals in Dhahran, Saudi Arabia in 1972 as an assistant professor. Five years later, in 1977, he was promoted to associate professor. He also served as Chairman of the Department of Mathematical Sciences, at the same university, from 1974 to 1977, and then as Dean of the College of Sciences from 1977 to 1984. In 1980, he was promoted to Full Professor, the highest academic rank in Saudi Arabia.

A visiting professor at King Saud University, Riyadh (1979–1982), and at Harvard University, USA (1983), Al-Daffa was twice elected President of the Union of Arab Mathematicians and Physicists (1979–1981 and 1986–1988). Prof. Daffa is/was member of the following organizations: the Committee of the Islamic Civilization Encyclopedia, the Royal Academy of Islamic Civilization Research, Jordan; the Academy of the Arabic Language, Jordan (honorary); the Scientific Council of the Islamic Foundation for Science, Technology and Development (IFSTAD), Jeddah, Saudi Arabia; the Board of King Faisal Center for Islamic Studies and Research, Riyadh (Saudi Arabia); and the Arab Scientific Society, Baghdad, Iraq.

He is the author of 36 books on mathematics and the history of sciences (32 in Arabic, 4 in English) and more than 250 articles in international and Saudi magazines. One of his better known books in English is The Muslim Contribution to Mathematics (Croom Helm, 1977, reissued in 2015 by Routledge Library Editions as part of its series, "Islamic Thought In The Middle Ages") He has been honored as one of the best researchers in the Islamic world. With respect to the history of science, one of his major concerns is to remind persons that in many areas of astronomy, architecture, mathematics and the natural and social sciences, scientific knowledge was preserved by Arab scholars translating from Greek to Arabic, from which such knowledge was ultimately disseminated to medieval Europe.

Al-Daffa’ is a Founding Fellow of the "Islamic World Academy of Sciences (IAS)" (1986).
