= Dammam Community College =

College in Saudi Arabia

Coordinates: 26°23′43″N 50°7′15″E

Dammam Community College (DCC)
- كلية المجتمع الدمام
- Type: Public
- Established: 2003; 23 years ago
- Affiliations: King Fahd University of Petroleum and Minerals
- Dean: Haithem
- Location: Dammam, Eastern Province, Saudi Arabia
- Website: www.dcc.kfupm.edu.sa

Dammam Community College (كلية المجتمع في الدمام) is a college located in Saudi Arabia Eastern Province. The college offers two years Associate Degree with six majors, Computer and Information Technology, Accounting, Marketing, Supply Chain Management, Human Resource Management and Safety Technology. Part-time option is also available for Saudi nationals as well as for expats and foreigners. The college is part of King Fahd University of Petroleum and Minerals.

== Mission ==
Founded in 2003, Dammam Community College is a newly established academic institution for higher education that enrolls high school graduates. It offers multiple educational streams to meet the increasing demand of local and international labor market. The DCC aims to develop skilled and competent workforce.

DCC is a vocational college that offers Associate Diploma. The college will keep on planning and establishing new vocational programs according to the strategic plans and the requirements of local and international labor market. The College offers diploma and associate degree programs in fields such as business, engineering, health sciences, and information technology.

== See also ==
- List of universities and colleges in Saudi Arabia
