= Khalid Al-Faisal =

Saudi royal, politician, and artist (born 1939)

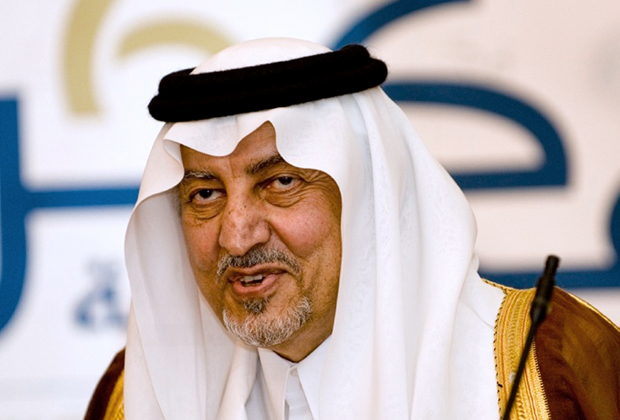
- Khalid Al-Faisal in 2007

Governor of Makkah Region
- Incumbent
- Assumed office 29 January 2015
- Appointed by: King Salman
- Preceded by: Mishaal bin Abdullah Al Saud
- In office 16 May 2007 – 22 December 2013
- Appointed by: King Abdullah
- Preceded by: Abdul Majeed bin Abdulaziz Al Saud
- Succeeded by: Mishaal bin Abdullah Al Saud

Minister of Education
- In office 22 December 2013 – 29 January 2015
- Monarchs: King Abdullah; King Salman
- Prime Minister: King Abdullah; King Salman
- Preceded by: Faisal bin Abdullah bin Mohammed Al Saud
- Succeeded by: Azzam bin Mohammad Al Dakheel

Governor of Asir Region
- In office 1971–2007
- Appointed by: King Faisal
- Preceded by: Fahd bin Saad bin Abdul Rahman Al Saud
- Succeeded by: Faisal bin Khalid bin Abdulaziz Al Saud

Personal details
- Born: 24 February 1939 (age 87) Mecca, Saudi Arabia
- Spouse: Princess Al Anoud bint Abdullah bin Mohammad
- Children: Bandar; Sultan; Saud
- House: Al Saud
- Parents: King Faisal (father); Haya binti Turki bin Abdulaziz Al Turki (mother)

Khalid bin Faisal Al Saud (Arabic: خالد بن فيصل ال سعود Khālid bin Fayṣal Āl Suʿūd; born 24 February 1939), commonly known as Khalid Al-Faisal, is a Saudi Arabian politician, artist, and poet who is the current governor of Makkah Province, in office from 2007 to 2013 and again since 2015. He was the Saudi minister of education from 2013 to 2015. He was also the governor of Asir Province from 1971 to 2007. He served as an adviser to King Salman. He is a grandson of Saudi Arabia's founder King Abdulaziz and a son of King Faisal.

== Early life and education ==
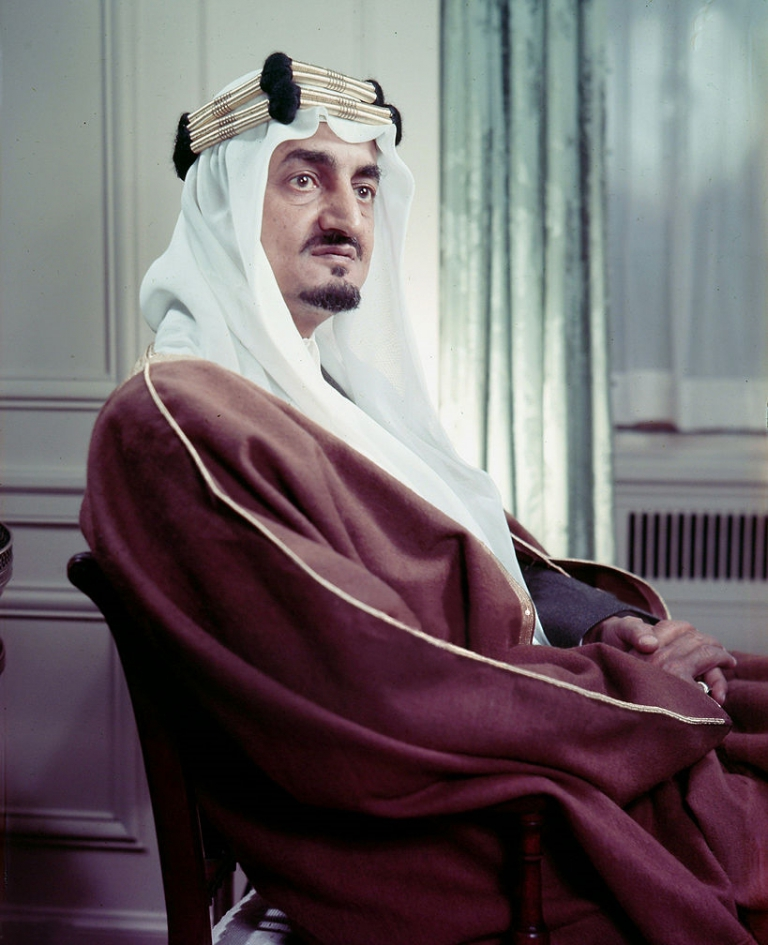
King Faisal, father of Khalid

Prince Khalid was born in Mecca on 24 February 1939. He is the third son of King Faisal. His mother is Haya bint Turki bin Abdulaziz Al Turki. Prince Khalid's full siblings are Prince Saad and Princess Noura.

In 1948, Prince Khalid attended Model School in Taif to receive secondary education. Like King Faisal's other children, Prince Khalid was educated abroad after completing secondary education in Saudi Arabia. He attended the Hun School of Princeton in New Jersey and graduated with a Bachelor of Arts degree in political economy from the University of Oxford in 1966.

== Political career ==
After returning to Saudi Arabia, Prince Khalid served as director general of the Presidency of Youth Welfare in the ministry of Labour and Social Affairs in 1967. His term lasted until April 1971 when he was appointed as governor of Asir Province, replacing Fahd bin Saad in the post. Khalid was governor of the province until 2007. He was credited with bringing the province a measure of modernity and prosperity. At the end of the 1990s and the beginning of the 2000s, he sought to use its natural beauty and cool climate to attract Arab tourists. But many inhabitants were resentful that the oil-based welfare state had not provided for them.

As governor, Prince Khalid held majlis, an open-house meeting with citizens, twice a day. The region also had its first telephone line under his governorship.

According to a leaked diplomatic cable, Prince Khalid went to extraordinary lengths to renovate his late father's palace to host a party for Prince Charles during his 2006 visit. The cable revealed that at the time Khalid had been living in the old palace which was in dire need of renovation. He directed a Western business associate to renovate the palace in three weeks and rewarded the businessman with $13,000 when Prince Charles was impressed. Khalid then built a new palace while the old palace was converted into a university.

On 16 May 2007, Khalid was appointed governor of Makkah Province by King Abdullah, replacing Prince Abdul Majeed bin Abdulaziz who died in office. The province includes the Muslim holy city of Makkah and the second largest city in Saudi Arabia, Jeddah. In 2010, he ordered hotels, restaurants, shops and wedding halls in the province to drop all their non-Arabic names and use Arabic only for signboards.

As governor, he played a major role in managing the annual Hajj in Makkah.

On 22 December 2013, he was appointed as minister of education, replacing Faisal bin Abdullah Al Saud in the post. On 29 January 2015, Prince Khalid was appointed once again the governor of Makkah Province by King Salman.

== Other roles ==
Prince Khalid is managing director of the King Faisal Foundation a large philanthropic and charitable organisation. The Foundation runs Alfaisal University in Riyadh where Prince Khalid is the chairman of the board of trustees, and also runs Effat University in Jeddah where Prince Khalid is a member of the board of trustees. He is the founder and current president of the organisation Painting and Patronage. In addition, he is a member of Allegiance Council. Prince Khalid is also the president of the Arab Thought Foundation.

== Influence ==
Prince Khalid is believed to be respected in the family, and appreciated for his combination of both modern and traditional sensibilities.

In 2010 Prince Khalid was mentioned as a future king when succession in the Al Saud passes on to the grandsons of King Abdulaziz. He was also considered to be among the possible contenders after Prince Nayef's death in June 2012. However, the other sons of King Faisal, Turki bin Faisal and Saud bin Faisal, were said to be regarded unfavourably within the royal family due to their perceived air of intellectual superiority. On the other hand, Prince Khalid might have advantages over brothers as a result of his long-term tenure as governor in that he is well known to the public.

== Views and alliances ==
Khalid Al Faisal criticized the negative coverage of Saudi Arabia by the Western media. He spoke out against misconceptions that characterize Saudi society as backwards and uneducated. During his tenure in Asir province, he was close to then Crown Prince Abdullah.

== Personal interests ==
Prince Khalid is an avid painter, poet and patron of the arts. In 1999, he founded Painting and Patronage to "build and foster valuable bridges of cultural, artistic and educational understanding between the Arab world and the international community". While he was governor of Asir, Khalid founded the Literary Club of Abha, the Abha Singing Festival, the Abha Prize for cultural excellence, and the Al-Miftaha Visual Arts Village in the capital city Abha. As governor of Makkah, he established the Cultural Council of Makkah. He is a close friend of King Charles III, former Prince Charles, who is a supporter of artistic painting.

== Personal life ==
Prince Khalid is married to Al Anoud bint Abdullah bin Mohammad bin Abdul Rahman Al Saud. Her mother is Noura bint Saud bin Abdulaziz, a daughter of King Saud. Her father, Abdullah, is a son of Mohammad bin Abdul Rahman who is King Abdulaziz's stepbrother.

Prince Khalid's eldest son, Prince Bandar, is the chairman of the board of directors of Al Watan, a reformist newspaper. His second son, Prince Sultan is a naval officer in Saudi army. His third and youngest son Prince Saud is the former deputy governor for investment affairs at the Saudi Arabian General Investment Authority (SAGIA).

== Honours and awards ==
=== Foreign honours ===
- Two Sicilian Royal Family: Knight Grand Cross of the Royal Order of Francis I
- Knight Grand Cross of the Order of Prince Henry the Navigator (Portugal)
- National Order of the Montenegrin Great Star, First Class (Montenegro)

=== Awards ===
Khalid bin Faisal was celebrated by the World Travel Awards as the World Travel Personality of the Year in 2010. This award is given to a personality whose achievements support the industry.

He was named the best Arab personality in the field of solving issues related to Arab youth in 2012. The award was given by the Arab Youth Media Forum, which is currently being held in Manama under the sponsorship of Bahrain's King Hamad bin Isa Al-Khalifa. In 2015, Prince Khalid was named the Cultural Personality of the Year by the Sharjah International Book Fair.
