= Al Watan (Saudi Arabia) =

Saudi Arabian newspaper

Al Watan الوطن
- Type: Daily newspaper
- Format: Broadsheet
- Owner: Bandar bin Khalid Al Faisal
- Founder(s): Assir Establishment for Press and Publishing
- Editor-in-chief: Othman al Sini
- Founded: 30 September 2000; 26 years ago
- Political alignment: Islamic, pro-reform
- Language: Arabic
- Headquarters: Abha
- Circulation: 150,000 (as of 2007)
- Website: Official website

Al Watan (Arabic: الوطن, lit. 'The Homeland') is a daily newspaper in Abha, Saudi Arabia. The chairman of the newspaper is Bandar bin Khalid.

The paper was previously based in the Asir province, the south-west of Saudi Arabia. Its headquarters were later moved to Jeddah. It also operates publishing facilities in London, New York, Amman, and Cairo.

== History and profile ==
Al Watan was launched on 1 September 2000 by Assir Establishment for Press and Publishing. Al Watan is said to be influenced by the perspectives of Khalid Al Faisal, who initiated the idea of establishing a national newspaper that reflects the pulse and lifestyle of Saudi Arabia, and seeks to engage a mass audience across all regions of the Kingdom. The publishing facilities of the paper were constructed on a site donated by late Crown Prince Sultan.

Al Watan was initially established as a small regional newspaper, eventually becoming one of the top three Arabic dailies in the Kingdom (ranked by IPSOS and PARC). It tied for first place in an independent bookshop audit conducted by PARC. Its vision was to become the number one most read newspaper in the Kingdom by 2012. It was rated among the most credible local newspapers and the most quoted by international media.

In early 2009, Al Watan presented its news identity to its readers in the Kingdom, which was a milestone for the newspaper. It also expanded its printing facilities across the Kingdom, making it the only Saudi daily that is printed every morning in four major cities within the Kingdom. The 48-pages of the new edition published in broadsheet format cover in depth Saudi affairs with a wide range of feature stories, news, analysis, lifestyle and reports. During the tenure of Jamal Khashoggi as editor-in-chief, Al Watan columnists aggressively poked at the contradictions and oppressive effects of Saudi Islam, especially with regard to women. Eventually, religious conservatives, under pressure of social change, regarded Al Watan as a major enemy.

The online edition of the paper was the 34th most visited website for 2010 in the MENA region.

== Political position ==
Al Watan is considered to be one of the most liberal newspapers in Saudi Arabia, the other one is Okaz.

It is further considered one of the most pro-reform newspapers in the country. However, in Saudi context, the liberalism is largely based on the capacity of the shareholders and the very powerful self-censorship of the journalists. World Association of Newspapers considers Al Watan as an outspoken paper, although newspapers in Saudi Arabia express more or less similar views on critical topics.

== Prominent columnists ==
Al Watan's editor-in-chief, Jamal Khashoggi, was an influential journalist who worked in the newspaper until May 2010. Khashoggi was assassinated in 2018. Additionally, it hosts relatively liberal columnists such as Turki Al Dakhil, Amira Kashari and Mahmoud Sabaagh. Talal Al Sheik serves as editor-in-chief and a member in board of directors of Saudi Journalists Association (SJA). Mahmoud Trawri, a former literary editor of Al Watan, won the Sharjah Award for Arab Creativity for his first novel Maimouna in 2001. The novel is about the role of local merchant in slave trade and the racism experienced by the North African people in Saudi Arabia. However, his book was banned in the Kingdom. Saudi activist Manal Al Sharif also wrote for the daily. Another Saudi Arabian woman journalist, Samar Al Mogran, is among the former contributors of Al Watan.

== Influence ==
Al Watan became a forum for reformist issues in the early 2003. Columnists initiated a discussion regarding whether the teachings of strict Muslim scholars were granted too much credence within Saudi society. They also began to challenge the authority of the mutaween, the religious police force. Late Interior Minister Prince Nayef, who effectively controlled the press in Saudi Arabia, clearly showed his distaste for the new discussions taking place. As a result of its progressive approach, religious conservatives began to call Al Watan Al-Wathan, which means "the idol" in Arabic. The paper is regarded as the youngest and one of the highest distribution papers in Saudi Arabia.

== Controversy ==
=== Resignation of editor-in-chief in 2002 ===
In March 2002, fifteen students at a girls' school in Mecca died due to fire. It was alleged that the feared religious police, or mutawaeen, had not attempted to rescue the students immediately, because the students inside the burning building were not wearing the requisite black body covering. In the following months, some editors were dismissed, including Qenan al Ghamdi, the brash editor-in-chief of Al Watan. Al Ghamdi was fired after a report described poor living conditions for Interior Ministry soldiers deployed to Mecca for the annual Hajj pilgrimage.

=== First resignation of Jamal Khashoggi, editor-in-chief, in 2003 ===
After the resignation of former editor-in-chief, Kenan Al Ghamdi, Jamal Khashoggi became editor-in-chief of Al Watan. However, his term lasted for less than two months in 2003. More specifically, his term lasted only for 54 days. May 2003 attacks in Saudi Arabia led to the liberals' attack against Wahhabi ideas that financially support salafism. Such criticisms were openly expressed through articles published in Al Watan. Specifically, after a week of intense debate following the bombings of three Riyadh housing complexes in May 2003, an Al Watan journalist asked the minister of interior, Nayef, if the attacks meant that the mutaween would be restructured. Prince Nayef replied, "As a Saudi, you should be ashamed to be asking this question". One week later, the government fired the editor-in-chief of the paper, Jamal Khashoggi.

=== Second resignation of Jamal Khashoggi, editor-in-chief, in 2010 ===
Jamal Khashoggi began to work as editor-in-chief again in Al Watan in 2007 after being an advisor to Turki Al Faisal during his post as Saudi Ambassador to the U.S. However, Khashoggi resigned from his post for a second time in May 2010. Al Watan announced that Khashoggi resigned "to focus on his personal projects". This statement was published on the website of the paper and in its Sunday edition. His resignation came three days after a column by poet Ibrahim al Almaee criticising Salafism was published. The column by al Almaee challenged the Salafists' rejection of popular religious traditions such as patronising shrines and graves of important Islamic figures. It is speculated that his resignation was related to official displeasure with articles critical of the state's harsh Islamic rules. After Khashoggi's resignation, Bandar bin Khalid al Faisal, the chairman of the newspaper, published a statement and praised him as "a loyal son... who left a clear mark on its (Al Watan's) progress."

=== Lawsuit and censorship ===
In March 2002, the Libyan government sued Al Watan due to its criticisms over the positions of Libya and its then leader, Muammar Gaddafi, leading to deterioration of the strong ties between Libya and Saudi Arabia.

Faisal bin Abdullah, president of the Saudi Red Crescent Society, filed a lawsuit due to perceived defamation against one of Al Watan journalists, Saleh al Shehy, in June 2007. The other controversy experienced by the paper was about Kenan bin Abdallah al Ghamidi. On 30 November 2007, the Ministry of Information and Culture asked him to stop writing for Al Watan without giving any explanation. This incident is seen as a clear example of censorship in Saudi Arabia by Reporters without Borders.

In February 2013, a criminal complaint was filed against Al Watan due to its publishing of a caricature criticizing Maronite Patriarch Bechara Al Rahi's visit to Syria.

== Content ==
Al Watan provides extensive but uncritical coverage of local news in addition to the usual positive reporting on the activities of the ruling family and the government.

An extraordinary article was published by Bandar bin Sultan, then-Saudi ambassador to Washington, in Al Watan, on 1 June 2004. Prince Bandar regarded the efforts of the Saudi security forces against terrorism as 'feeble', and declared that terrorism "has nothing to do with America or Israel or the Christians or Jews . . . So let us stop these meaningless justifications for what those criminals are doing and let [us] stop blaming others while the problem comes from within us'. He also pointed out that the Kingdom's religious scholars 'have to declare jihad against those deviants and to fully support it, as those who keep silent about the truth are mute devils". He further argued that religious fighters operating inside the kingdom should be "vanquished" the way "King Abdul Aziz did at the Battle of Sabilla [in 1929]".

Majed Garoub, the head of the Jeddah lawyers' committee, in three articles published in Al Watan in the period of May–June 2010, called for the adoption of certain measures against domestic violence.

On 8 June 2010, Al Watan published a story about the religious police entering a woman's flat after midnight in the Fahd neighbourhood of Najran without apparent cause two days earlier. Nearly two weeks later, on 21 June 2010, the commission issued an apology, again published in Al Watan, stating "we express our apology about the unintentional inconvenience and injury this matter has caused, and we apologize to all regarding what our brothers, the members of the commission, have rushed into".

In August 2013, an editorial of the paper stated that a foreign military strike against Syria due to civil war in the country was inevitable whatever its form would be.

== Sponsorship ==
Al Watan is a partner of Saudi Falcons, a Saudi motosport team of which one of its members is Abdulaziz bin Turki Al Faisal.

== International sister newspaper ==
Al Watan's international sister newspaper is Harian Metro in Malaysia.

== See also ==
- List of newspapers in Saudi Arabia
