= Najd National Schools =

- Riyadh; Saudi Arabia

Information
- Type: Private
- Established: 1983
- Founder: Rafic Hariri
- Principal: Bandar Almogbel
- Grades: Kindergarten to 12
- Gender: boys-girls
- Language: Arabic - English - French
- Accreditation: NEASC
- Website: nns.edu.sa

Najd National Schools (Arabic: مدارس نجد الأهلية) is one of the main educational institutions located in Riyadh, Saudi Arabia. It is in the northern part of the capital, Riyadh, and is built in a very prominent part of the city; between King Fahd Street and Olaya Street which are some of the most used streets in Riyadh. The school was first built in 1983 by Mr Rafic Hariri as a contribution to community development. The current principal of Najd National Schools is "Bander Ibn Saud Almogbel", past principals include "Khalid Ibn Ibrahim Abanmi", "Dr. Zaid bin Muhammed Albattal", "Dr. Abdulrahman bin Abdullah Alsaikhan " and "Fayez Abdullah Alsaweed".

The school has been running for more than 30 years. It is supervised by the Saudi Ministry of Education. The school prepares its students to pass several international foreign language exams, such as the TOEFL, SAT, and DELF.

Notable former students include Prince Mansoor bin Abdullah bin Abdulaziz, Lebanese Prime Minister Saad Hariri. For a number of years it has also been known to send a number of its students on an educational trip to Lebanon, The United Kingdom, Switzerland, The United States, and Spain; For a plethora of different activities, Including: Football academy trips to Madrid, skiing trips to Gstaad, and academic trips to Boston and Oxford. Additionally, students are sent to numerous trips across Saudi Arabia for educational opportunities in Khobar and Jeddah.

== See also ==
- Education in Saudi Arabia
- Youth in Saudi Arabia
- Riyadh, Saudi Arabia
