= Order of the Republic of Montenegro =

Republic of Montenegro order

Order of the Republic of Montenegro Orden Republike Crne Gore

Awarded by Montenegro
- Type: Order of merit
- Eligibility: Heads of state

Statistics
- First induction: 2006

Precedence
- Next (higher): None
- Next (lower): Order of the Montenegrin Grand Star
- Ribbon of the order

Order of the Republic of Montenegro (Montenegrin: Orden Republike Crne Gore, Орден Републике Црнe Горe) is the highest state order of Montenegro. The order is awarded by the President of Montenegro to prominent individuals. It is awarded on a large necklace, and on a sash. The order was designed by Serbian sculptor and university professor Miroljub Stamenković.

== Ranks ==
Order of the Republic of Montenegro has two classes.

1st class	2nd class

== Recipients ==
- 2018 – (Bulgaria) Boyko Borisov
- 2017 – (Norway) Jens Stoltenberg
- 2017 – Abdullah II of Jordan
- 2016 – (Bulgaria) Rosen Plevneliev
- 2025 – (Italy) Sergio Mattarella
- 2026 – (France) Emmanuel Macron

== See also ==
- Orders, decorations, and medals of Montenegro
