= Qenan Al-Ghamdi =

Saudi Arabian journalist

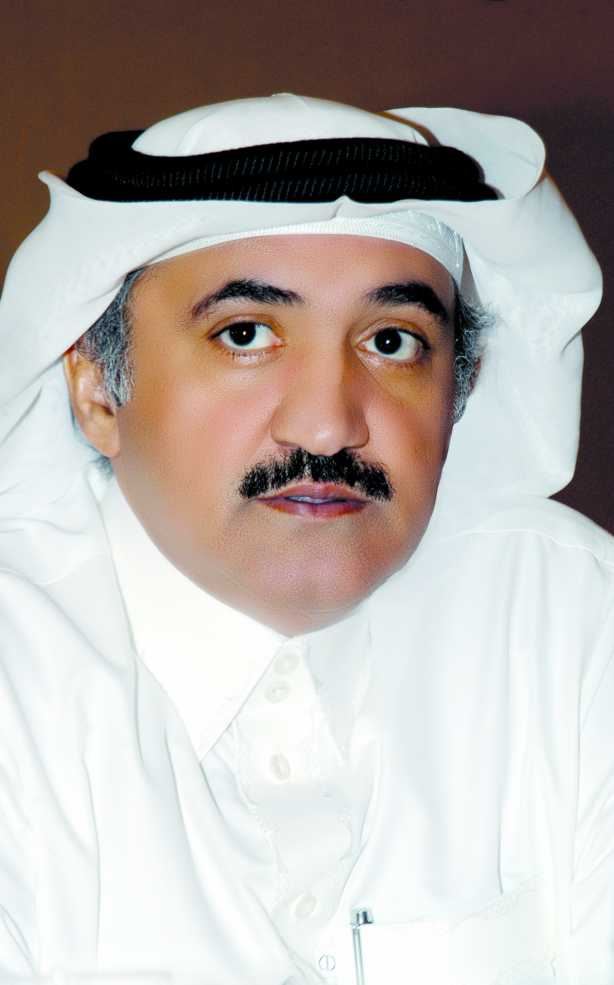
Portrait of Qenan Al-Ghamdi

Mr Qenan Al-Ghamdi (Arabic: قينان الغامدي) is a Saudi Arabian journalist and former editor in chief of Al-Watan (Arabic: جريدة الوطن السعودية), a popular newspaper based in the south of Saudi Arabia.
