= Antisemitism in Saudi Arabia =

In the 2000s, Saudi Arabian media often attacked Jews in books, news articles, and mosques. Saudi Arabian government officials and state religious leaders often promoted the idea that Jews are conspiring to take over the entire world; as proof of their claims, they published and frequently cited The Protocols of the Elders of Zion as factual.

== Antisemitism in public administration ==
Barring people with either Israeli passports or Israeli stamps in their passport from visiting Saudi Arabia, has been a long-established practice. When in February 2004, Saudi Arabia started issuing visas to non-Muslims for the first time, in order to attract more foreign visitors, the website of the Saudi Arabian Supreme Commission for Tourism initially stated that Jews would not be granted tourist visas to enter the country. The discriminatory stipulation was widely reported and drew strong criticism, renewing the notion of Saudi Arabia being a "backward country". Subsequently, the Saudi embassy in the U.S. distanced itself from the statement, apologizing for posting "erroneous information", which was later removed.

Members of religions other than Islam, including Jews, are not permitted to practice their religion publicly in Saudi Arabia; according to the U.S. State Department, religious freedom "does not exist" in Saudi Arabia. Islam is the official religion of Saudi Arabia, and the tenets of that religion are enforced by law.

== Antisemitism in school textbooks ==
Saudi textbooks vilify Jews (as well as Christians and non-Wahhabi Muslims): according to the 21 May 2006 issue of The Washington Post, Saudi textbooks claimed by them to have been "sanitized" of antisemitism still call Jews apes (and Christians swine); demand that students avoid and not befriend Jews; claim that Jews worship the devil; and encourage Muslims to engage in jihad to vanquish Jews.

The Center for Religious Freedom of Freedom House analyzed a set of Saudi Ministry of Education textbooks in Islamic studies courses for elementary and secondary school students. The researchers found statements promoting hatred of Christians, Jews, "polytheists" and other "unbelievers," including non-Wahhabi Muslims. The fictitious Protocols of the Elders of Zion was being taught as historical fact. The texts described Jews and Christians as enemies of Muslims, and the clash between them was described as an ongoing fight that will end in victory over the Jews. Jews were blamed for virtually all the "subversion" and wars of the modern world. A "38-page overview" (PDF). Archived from the original (PDF) on 2007-09-25. (371 KB) of Saudi Arabia's curriculum has been released to the press by the Hudson Institute.

== Antisemitism in Saudi media ==
Saudi Arabian media often attacks Jews in books, news articles. Saudi Arabian government officials and state religious leaders often promote the idea that Jews are conspiring to take over the entire world; as proof of their claims they publish and frequently cite The Protocols of the Elders of Zion as factual.

One Saudi Arabian government newspaper suggested that hatred of all Jews is justifiable. "Why are they (the Jews) hated by all the people which hosted them, such as Iraq and Egypt thousands years ago, and Germany, Spain, France and the UK, up to the days they gained of power over the capital and the press, in order to rewrite the history?"

Even during the height of the Saudi crackdown on extremism in 2004, a Saudi IQRA TV "man on the street" segment on feelings toward Jews, was entirely antagonistic. Interviewees described Jews as "our eternal enemies", "murderous", "the enemies of Allah and His Prophet," "murderers of prophets," "the filthiest people on the face of this earth", etc.

In 2001, Arab Radio and Television of Saudi Arabia produced a 30-part television miniseries entitled "Horseman Without a Horse", a dramatization of The Protocols of the Elders of Zion. One Saudi Arabian government newspaper suggested that hatred of all Jews is justifiable.

== Antisemitism in religious circles ==
Antisemitism is common within religious circles. Abdul Rahman Al-Sudais, the imam of the Grand mosque in Mecca, Saudi Arabia, has been described as an antisemite for publicly praying to God to 'terminate' the Jews.

The BBC aired a Panorama episode, entitled A Question of Leadership, which reported that Abdul Rahman Al-Sudais, the leading imam of the Masjid al-Haram located in the Islamic holy city of Mecca, Saudi Arabia, referred to Jews as "the scum of the human race" and "offspring of apes and pigs". Al-Sudais further stated: "the worst [...] of the enemies of Islam are those [...] whom he [...] made monkeys and pigs, the aggressive Jews and oppressive Zionists and those that follow them [...] Monkeys and pigs and worshippers of false Gods who are the Jews and the Zionists." In another sermon, on 19 April 2002, he declared that Jews are "evil offspring, infidels, distorters of [others'] words, calf-worshippers, prophet-murderers, prophecy-deniers [...] the scum of the human race whom Allah cursed and turned into apes and pigs".

Famous Saudi da'is such as Assim Al-Hakeem (who has a large English-speaking following worldwide) have been known to spread antisemitic tropes, and saying that Jewish hatred toward Muslims is part of the Jews' DNA.

== See also ==
- History of the Jews in Saudi Arabia
- Islam and antisemitism
- Israel–Saudi Arabia relations
