= Sama (airline) =

Saudi low-cost airline

IATA	ICAO	Call sign
ZS	SMY	NAJIM
- Founded: 2007
- Ceased operations: 24 August 2010
- Operating bases: King Abdulaziz International Airport; King Khalid International Airport
- Fleet size: 6
- Destinations: 10 (upon closure)
- Parent company: Investment Enterprises Ltd
- Headquarters: Dammam, Saudi Arabia
- Key people: Bandar bin Khalid Al Faisal (Chairman); Bruce Ashby (CEO)
- Website: www.flysama.com

Sama LelTayaran Company Limited, operating as Sama, was a Saudi low-cost airline based at King Fahad International Airport in Dammam, operating scheduled flights within Saudi Arabia and the Middle East. The airline's registered address was in Riyadh.

== History ==
Sama was founded in March 2007 by Investment Enterprises Ltd, chaired by Bandar bin Khalid Al Faisal. Initial investment was received from 30 major Saudi private and institutional investors including Olayan Financial Co, Xenel Industries Ltd, Saudi Industrial Services Co, Sara Development Company Ltd and Modern Investment Company for Trade and Industries. The airline initially focused on domestic flights, then added international destinations during 2008. Another major restructuring occurred during 2009, when the airline's timetables were optimized towards high aircraft utilization in an attempt to improve the financial results of the company (which also saw unprofitable routes being dropped, and frequencies for successful destinations being increased).

On 24 August 2010, the airline was forced to shut down because of budgetary constraints arising out of poor funding, which had resulted in a 266 million U.S. dollar loss.

== Destinations ==
Sama Airlines served the following destinations (as of February 2010):

- Egypt
  - Alexandria - Borg El Arab Airport
  - Assiut - Assiut Airport
- Jordan
  - Amman - Queen Alia International Airport
- Lebanon
  - Beirut - Beirut Rafic Hariri International Airport
- Saudi Arabia
  - Dammam - King Fahd International Airport
  - Jeddah - King Abdulaziz International Airport Base
  - Riyadh - King Khalid International Airport Base
- Syria
  - Aleppo - Aleppo International Airport
  - Damascus - Damascus International Airport
- United Arab Emirates
  - Sharjah - Sharjah International Airport

=== Terminated destinations ===
- Egypt - Sharm el Sheikh
- India - Mumbai
- Saudi Arabia - Abha, Bisha, Gassim, Gurayat, Ha'il, Jizan, Madinah, Rafha, Tabuk, Ta'if
- Syria - Latakia
- United Arab Emirates - Abu Dhabi

== Fleet ==
During its time of operation the airline operated the following aircraft:

- 6 Boeing 737-300
- 1 British Aerospace Jetstream 41

== See also ==
- List of defunct airlines of Saudi Arabia
