= King Fahd University of Petroleum and Minerals =

Public university in Dhahran, Saudi Arabia

Coordinates: 26°18′35″N 50°08′38″E

King Fahd University of Petroleum & Minerals جامعة الملك فهد للبترول و المعادن Jāmiʿat al-Malik Fahd li-l-Bitrūl wa-l-Maʿādin
- Former names: College of Petroleum and Minerals (1963–1975); University of Petroleum and Minerals (1975–1986)
- Motto: نحلم ونحقق
- Motto in English: Dream Big and Accomplish
- Type: Nonprofit Research University
- Established: 23 September 1963; 63 years ago
- President: Dr. Muhammad M. Al-Saggaf
- Faculty: 800+
- Students: 13,772 (2025)
- Undergraduates: 9,674 - 61% (2025)
- Postgraduates: 4,098 - 39% (2025)
- Location: Dhahran, Eastern Province, Saudi Arabia
- Campus: Enclosed
- Colors: Green & White
- Nicknames: جامعة البترول; University of Petroleum
- Website: www.kfupm.edu.sa

King Fahd University of Petroleum and Minerals (KFUPM) is the first Arab university to be ranked amongst the top 100 in the world. A research university in Dhahran, Eastern Province, Saudi Arabia, KFUPM aims to prepare the next generation to create new sectors and address global challenges aligned with the UN SDGs.

Founded near the earliest local oil fields, initially as the College of Petroleum & Minerals (1963) in response to the booming energy industry of Saudi Arabia, the university centers around science, technology, engineering, and business subjects. In 2025, the university was ranked 2nd globally for its number of U.S. utility patents, by the National Academy of Inventors (NAI),. Also, according to the NAI, KFUPM has consecutively held the record of the highest STEM patent-per-capita rate in the world since 2023. In 2026, the university placed first in the Middle East & North Africa (MENA) region, based on Times Higher Education rankings, and in 2027, it reached 63rd globally according to QS Ranking. KFUPM's engineering subjects also rank among the top 80 globally, according to the QS subject rankings.

== History ==
KFUPM is a reputable university in Saudi Arabia, as well as the Middle East and Africa. It was initially established as the College of Petroleum and Minerals on September 23, 1963, by a Saudi royal decree, with the goal to provide high-level education in the academic fields of petroleum and minerals, two of the most valuable natural resources in Saudi Arabia at that time.

During its very first admissions round, 67 young men were registered. The original campus was designed by CRS Design Associates, architects and engineers of Houston, Texas. The college was elevated to university status in 1975 when it expanded its academic offerings in science, engineering, technology, and business. In 1984, the Program of Industrial and Systems Engineering was first introduced. The university was renamed after King Fahd in 1986. Since that time, enrollment has grown to over 10,000 students by the 2021 academic year and has graduated more than 39,000 students since its inception.

In 2019, the university put in place a transformation plan whose primary goal was to support the transformation of the Kingdom of Saudi Arabia from a natural resource monetizing economy primarily focused on oil and gas resources, into a diversified knowledge economy.

Part of this transformation plan presents an important milestone in the history of the university with the inclusion of female students in the engineering and technical academic programs. In 2019, male and female students were equally accepted into new graduate programs for the first time in the history of the university, and in 2021 admissions started for female students at the undergraduate level, on a merit basis. It now has one of the highest enrollment rates for female engineering students in the world, placed between 40 and 50% yearly. In 2026, KFUPM graduated its first batch of female undergraduate students.

== Academics ==
=== Academic programs ===
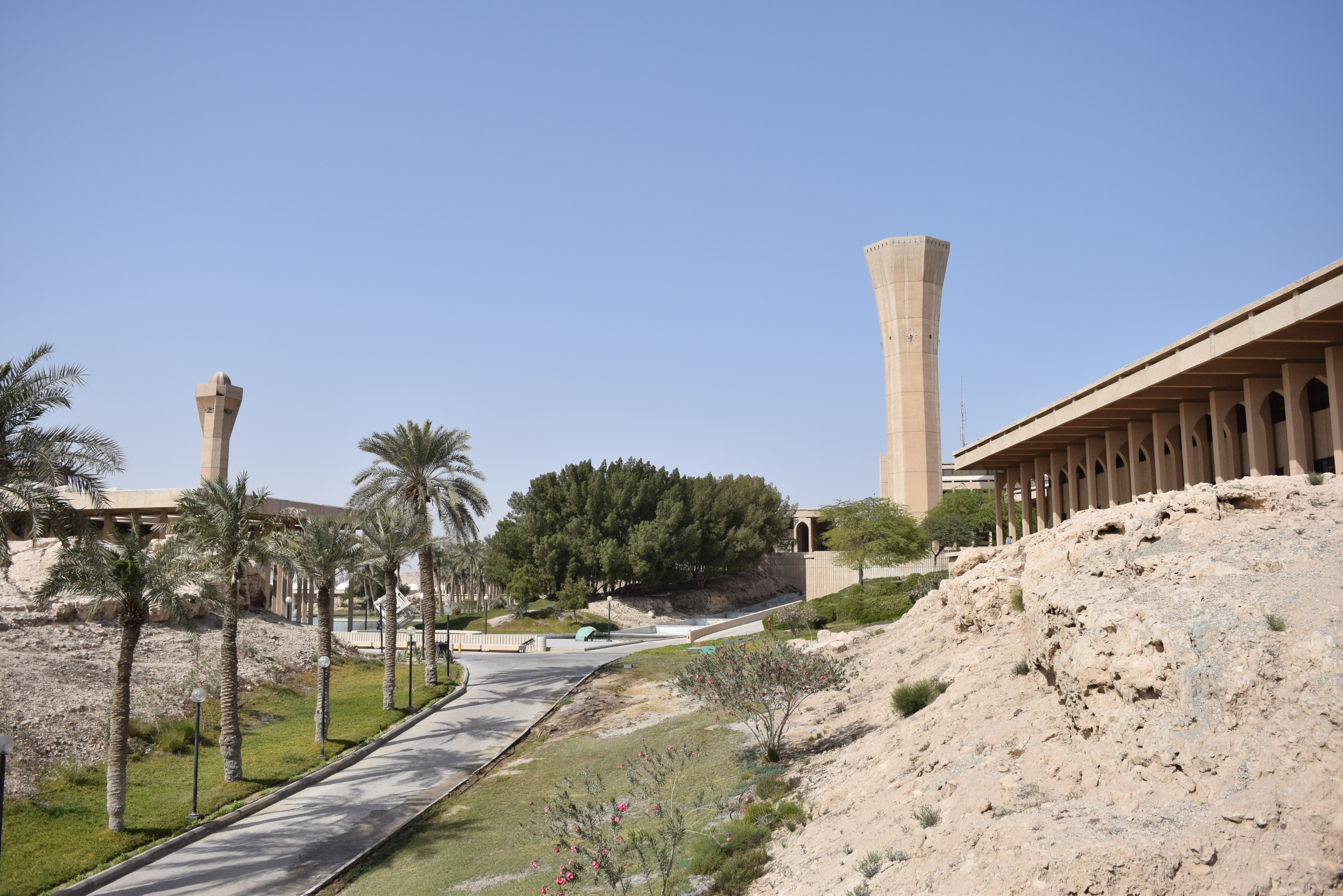
KFUPM's Campus

KFUPM degree offerings include Bachelor of Science, Master of Science, Master of Engineering, Master of Business Administration, and Doctor of Philosophy.

The university's academic programs are focused on engineering, sciences, technology, and business, being accredited by international bodies such as ABET, AACSB, as well as the national accrediting body NCAAA.

Since 2020, the university has introduced new aspects to its academic programs through undergraduate concentrations (CX) and professional master's degrees (known as project-based MS). As of June 2026, KFUPM had reached 43 undergraduate concentrations (CX) throughout its disciplines, along with 36 one-year master's degrees, and 20+ interdisciplinary research centers.

=== Innovative learning ===
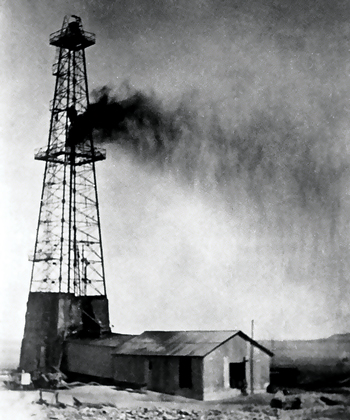
Dammam No. 7 on March 4, 1938, near where KFUPM would later be built

The initial 35 undergraduate degrees offered were recently revised to include the study of emerging fields, including modern programming languages, data science, big data analysis, artificial intelligence, machine learning, cybersecurity, quantum computing and more. Currently, every major starts with Artificial Intelligence (AI) courses and then branches into more specific topics.

Additionally, KFUPM has launched an effort to migrate some of its courses into additional instructional methods, such as inquiry-based learning (IBL), where research on the topics is encouraged to enhance the class time with discussions, debates, as well as questions and answers. It also offers hybrid attendance options (HIVE) for several of its project-based master's degrees.

KFUPM's 43 undergraduate concentrations (CX) allow students to add a specialization in an area beyond their major. A few examples of these concentrations are Hydrogen Mobility, Renewable Energy and Energy Storage, Artificial Intelligence and Machine Learning, Business Analytics, Robotics and Autonomous Systems.

KFUPM offers 36 one-year professional master's degrees (project-based MS) in several fields such as Artificial Intelligence, Supply Chain Management, Quantum Computing, Smart and Sustainable Cities.

=== Admissions ===
KFUPM is a merit-based admissions academic institution. With an acceptance rate of 4% (2023), it is considered to be one of the most coveted universities in Saudi Arabia, recruiting roughly the top 1% of the national talent based on admission criteria that include performance on the nationwide aptitude tests to ensure the acceptance of the most promising students.

KFUPM continues to attract the most outstanding high school graduates by accepting winners in international scientific Olympiad competitions. The progression of students in the first year has also been accelerated by developing programs to bypass the preparatory year (SkipPrep).

=== Rankings ===
University rankings

Global – Overall
- QS World: 63 (2027)
- THE World: =184 (2026)
- USNWR Global: =400 (2023)

Regional – Overall
- QS Arab region: 1 (2026)
- USNWR Asia: 75 (2022)

KFUPM was named the top university in the Arab Region as per the QS University Rankings for 2027, and repeatedly since 2015. In 2026, it was ranked the first university in the Middle East and North Africa.

Since the KFUPM transformation phase started in 2019, the university's rankings have seen a steady rise. According to the QS World University Rankings, KFUPM is 63rd university in the world for 2027.

=== Accreditation ===
All programs of the engineering colleges were evaluated for "Substantial-Equivalency" recognition by the Accreditation Board for Engineering and Technology (ABET). They were found substantially equivalent to similar accredited programs in the United States. All Business & Management related programs offered by KFUPM Business School (including its flagship Master of Business Administration) are accredited by the Association to Advance Collegiate Schools of Business (AACSB). KFUPM has been a member of AACSB since 1975 and it is among the first few schools outside the US to get this prestigious recognition. KFUPM is also accredited by the national accrediting body NCAAA.

== Organization ==
=== Colleges ===
KFUPM undergraduate and graduate programs are divided into seven colleges. As part of the university's recent transformational initiatives, all colleges recently underwent a complete restructuring to encourage collaboration among disciplines, and encourage cross-discipline research.

- College of Engineering and Physics
- College of Computing and Mathematics
- College of Petroleum Engineering and Geosciences
- College of Chemicals and Materials
- College of Design and Built Environment
- KFUPM Business School
- College of General Studies

In addition, Dammam Community College is under the auspices of King Fahd University of Petroleum and Minerals as a fully approved academic entity by the Minister of Higher Education.

=== AMAAD Business Park ===
AMAAD is a mega real estate investment project of KFUPM Endowment spread across an area of 214,000 sqm in Dhahran.

== Research ==
=== Research Innovation ===
KFUPM's research ecosystem is led by its Research and Innovation Office, which oversees 20+ research centers (shown below) and is continuously expanding. Spanning multiple emerging fields, the centers are divided into interdisciplinary, applied and joined research centers, as well as two consortia, bringing together faculty members, researchers, and students. The Research and Innovation Office has produced hundreds of research reports for industrial and government sponsors. KFUPM offers different scholarships for international students. These scholarships cover all tuition, fees, living costs, monthly expenses, medical coverage, free textbooks, subsidized meals in the university's dining facilities, funds for projects, and many other privileges.

Research Center	Director
Artificial Intelligence (SDAIA-KFUPM)	Dr. Maad Al Owaifeer
Advanced Materials	Dr. Mohannad Mayyas
Membranes & Water Security	Dr. Essam Aljundi
Intelligent Manufacturing & Robotics	Dr. Abul Fazal Muhammad Arif
Smart Mobility & Logistics	Dr. Sami Elferik
Integrative Petroleum Research	Dr. Theis Solling
Intelligent Secure Systems	Dr. Muhamad Felemban
Sustainable Energy Systems	Dr. Atif AlZahrani
Refining & Advanced Chemicals	Dr. Wael Ahmed Fouad
Hydrogen Technologies & Carbon Management	Dr. Sulaiman Alturaifi
Construction & Building Materials	Dr. Mohammed Al-Osta
Communication Systems & Sensing	Dr. Daniel Benevides da Costa
Finance & Digital Economy	Dr. Yogesh Kumar Dwivedi
Environment & Marine Studies	Dr. Luai M. Alhems
Development of Non-profit Organizations	Dr. Basem M. Almadani
Metrology, Standards, & Testing	Dr. Obaidallah Munteshari
Industrial Nuclear Energy	Dr. Afaque Shams
Petroleum Conversion Center	Dr. Wael Ahmed Fouad
Aviation & Space Exploration	Dr. Ayman Abdallah
Biosystems & Machines	Dr. Yaqub Mahnashi
Energy Research (KACARE-KFUPM)	Dr. Fahad Al-Sulaiman
Energy Efficiency (KACST-KFUPM)	Dr. Fahad A. Al-Sulaiman
Hydrogen Future (consortium)	Dr. Zain Hassan Yamani
Sustainable Future (consortium)	Dr. Mohannad Mayyas

=== Innovation & Technology Transfer (ITT) Center ===
Students (local and international), faculty and researchers are encouraged and supported with launching their startup. Through its "0-0-0" policy (0 fees, equity, royalty), KFUPM ensures that intellectual property remains with the inventors. At the ITT Center, students and researchers receive support for copyright, trademark registration, licensing, and patent filing.

=== Dream Realization Lab (DRL) ===
The DRL is designed to bring product ideas to life through access to prototyping tools, fabrication facilities, and technical support. Inventors can work alongside specialists, participate in skill-building workshops, and refine their business concept in preparation for real-world testing.

KFUPM students regularly go on to present their ideas at global competitions such as the Startup World Cup and the Geneva International Exhibition of Inventions. Internally, the annual KFUPM Student Projects Expo offers them the chance to connect with industry representatives and showcase progress, thus providing a potential bridge to either an external business incubator/accelerator or patent registration.

=== Dhahran Techno Valley ===
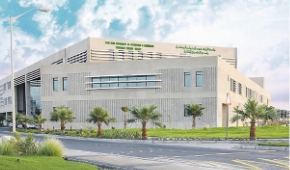
Dhahran Techno Valley Company headquarters in Dhahran, Saudi Arabia

The Dhahran Techno Valley Holding Company (DTVC) is a subsidiary company fully owned by KFUPM. It was created to promote a knowledge-based economy in Dhahran and the Eastern Province. It is a hub for entrepreneurship and a launchpad for innovators from within and outside KFUPM. The ecosystem includes KFUPM and national companies like Saudi Aramco, SABIC, Saudi Electricity Company, technology partners, small to medium size companies, and multiple startups.

The mission of the Dhahran Techno Valley Holding Company is to foster an environment for innovation and collaboration by attracting and supporting industry players focused on creating innovative technologies and adding value to its stakeholders.

DTVC also plays an important part in revitalizing the role of entrepreneurship in the research system by rejuvenating and encouraging a spirit of developing new business opportunities for faculty, students, and stakeholders from outside the university.

== University bodies ==
=== President ===
The president is the head of the institution and the university's chief academic and executive officer. The current president of KFUPM is Muhammad M. Al-Saggaf.

Previous presidents:

- Dr. Sahel N. Abduljauwad (acting)
- H.E. Dr. Khaled S. Al-Sultan
- H.E. Dr. Abdulaziz Al Dukhayyil
- H.E. Dr. Bakr Bin Bakr
- Dr. Saleh Ambah

=== International advisory board (IAB) ===
The international advisory board (IAB) of King Fahd University of Petroleum & Minerals provides KFUPM's senior management with a global perspective on trends and issues that may affect the university. Since its establishment in March 2007, the IAB membership has included renowned academics and some of the most influential local and international corporate figures.

IAB members discuss a wide variety of topics related to the university and have been very effective in guiding the university's academic programs, research activities, faculty recruitment, outreach to peer institutions, and others. The IAB has guided the development of action plans and specific strategies on key educational and research areas of national interest.

The current IAB Members are as follows:

- Charles Elachi: IAB Chairman, director of NASA's Jet Propulsion Laboratory (JPL), Pasadena, California.
- Amin H. Nasser: President and CEO, Saudi Aramco, Saudi Arabia.
- Muhammad M. Al-Saggaf: President, King Fahd University of Petroleum and Minerals (KFUPM), Saudi Arabia.
- Munier Eldesouki: President, King Abdulaziz City for Science and Technology (KACST), Saudi Arabia.
- François Ortalo-Magné: Former Dean and CEO, London Business School, United Kingdom.
- Santiago Iñiguez de Onzoño: President, IE University, Spain.
- Robert Wilt: CEO, Ma'aden, Saudi Arabia.
- Arun Majumdar: Dean, Stanford Doerr School of Sustainability, United States.

Former IAB Members

- Martin C. Jischke: chairman international advisory board, president emeritus, Purdue University, Indiana, United States.
- Abdulaziz Saleh Aljarbou: chairman, Saudi Basic Industries Corporation (SABIC), Saudi Arabia.
- Seifi Ghasemi: chairman, president, and CEO Air Products, United States.
- Paal Kibsgaard: CEO of Katerra Menlo Park, California.
- Suh Nam-pyo: president of Korea Advanced Institute of Science and Technology (KAIST), South Korea.
- Tony F. Chan: president of King Abdullah University of Science and Technology (Kaust), Saudi Arabia.
- Samir A. Al Baiyat: secretary-general of international advisory board, and director of the Office of International Cooperation, KFUPM, Saudi Arabia.
- Abdallah S. Jum'ah: former vice chairman of international advisory board, former president and CEO [Saudi Aramco], Saudi Arabia.
- Tony Meggs: former group vice president – technology BP, London, England
- Kazuo Oike: former president of Kyoto University, Japan.
- David J. O'Reilly: chairman and chief executive officer, Chevron Corporation, U.S.
- G. Wayne Clough: secretary of the Smithsonian Institution, U.S.
- Shih Choon Fong: president of King Abdullah University of Science and Technology, Thuwal, Saudi Arabia; former president of the National University of Singapore, Singapore.
- Wolfgang A. Herrmann: president, Technical University of Munich (TUM), Germany.
- Henry Rosovsky: Lewis P. and Linda L. Geyser, professor emeritus at Harvard University, Massachusetts, United States.
- Robert J. Birgeneau: chancellor, University of California, Berkeley, United States.
- Andrew Gould: non-executive chairman of the board, BG Group, England
- John Etchemendy: provost of Stanford University, California, U.S.
- Khalid A. Al-Falih: chief executive officer of Saudi Aramco, Saudi Arabia.
- Mohamed Al-Mady: vice-chairman and chief executive officer, Saudi Basic Industries Corporation, Saudi Arabia.
- Olivier Appert: chairman and chief executive officer Institut Francais du Petrole (IFP), France.
- Joe Saddi: vice chairman, Booz & Company, U.S.
- Khaled S. Al-Sultan: ex-rector of KFUPM and president of King Abdullah City for Atomic and Renewable Energy (K.A.CARE).
- Yousef Abdullah Al-Benyan: vice-chairman and CEO, Saudi Basic Industries Corporation (SABIC), Saudi Arabia.
- Didier Houssin: chairman and CEO, IFP Energies Nouvelles (IFPEN), Paris, France
- George P. "Bud" Peterson: president, Georgia Institute of Technology, United States.
- John G. Rice: vice-chairman, General Electric and president and chief executive officer of GE Technology Infrastructure, United States.
- Jean-Lou Chameau: president, King Abdullah University of Science & Technology (KAUST), Saudi Arabia
- Hugo F. Sonnenschein: president emeritus and Adam Smith Distinguished Service Professor, University of Chicago, Illinois, United States.
- Khattab G. Al-Hinai: former secretary-general of international advisory board.
- Muhammad A. Al-Arfaj: former secretary-general of international advisory board.

== Notable alumni ==
=== Government and Public Services ===
- Abdulaziz bin Salman, Minister of Energy (BSc and MBA, in industrial administration, '85)
- Abdullah Abdulrahman Almogbel, former minister of transport and mayor of Riyadh
- Abdulaziz bin Majid, former governor of Al Medina Al Monawwarah.
- Bandar bin Khalid Al Faisal, former chairman of Sama Airlines and member of Arab Thought Foundation Board of Trustees (BSc, Computer Science, '88)
- Saud bin Khalid Al Faisal, deputy governor of Saudi Arabian General Investment Authority and president of National Competitiveness Center(NCC) (BSc, Finance '01)
- Ghazi Mashal Ajil al-Yawer, was President of Iraq under the Iraqi Interim Government after the 2003 invasion of Iraq.
- Fahd bin Abdul Rahman Balghunaim, former Saudi minister of agriculture (BSc, Civil Engineering, '75).
- Abdullatif bin Ahmed Al Othman, former governor of Saudi Arabian General Investment Authority and former senior vice president of finance Saudi Aramco (BSc, Civil Engineering, '79).
- Ahmed Alsuwaiyan, was appointed Governor and board member of the Digital Government Authority (DGA) in May 2021.

=== Academics ===
- Khaled S. Al-Sultan: former Rector of KFUPM, former dean of the college of Computer Systems and Engineering, former chair of the Department of Systems Engineering at KFUPM, former professor of optimization and operations research at the Department of Systems Engineering at KFUPM, former assistant minister of higher hducation in Saudi Arabia, KFUPM, (BSc and MSc, Systems Engineering, '87)
- Zaghloul El-Naggar, a Muslim scholar and chairman of Committee of Scientific Notions in the Qur'an, Supreme Council of Islamic Affairs, Cairo, Egypt. El-Najjar worked as a professor of geology at KFUPM from 1979 to 1996
- Ali Abdullah Al-Daffa, professor in field of History of Mathematics.
- Hamdi Tchelepi, he is the professor and chair of the department of energy science and engineering at Stanford university, Tchelepi got his BSc and MSc from King Fahad University of Petroleum and Minerals in 1985 and 1988 respectively, he is well known researcher in the field of reservoir simulation and multiphase flow.

=== Oil and gas industry ===
- Khalid A. Al-Falih, former Minister of Energy, Industry and Mineral Resources and former chairman and president and CEO of Saudi Aramco, earned M.B.A.in 1991.
- Nadhmi Al-Nasr, former interim president of King Abdullah University of Science and Technology and Saudi Aramco Vice President of KAUST (BSc in Chemical Engineering '79).
- Saad bin Abdulaziz Al Qanbar Entrepreneur and Chairman of Saja Energy Company based in Saudi Arabia.

=== Business ===
- Olayan bin Mohammed Alwetaid, CEO of Saudi Telecom Company (BA, electrical engineering)

=== Sports and media ===
- Yasser Al-Qahtani, Saudi Arabian footballer (drop-out)

== See also ==
- Aramco
- Saudi Data and Artificial Intelligence Authority (SDAIA)
- Ministry of Energy (Saudi Arabia)
- American Institute of Aeronautics and Astronautics
- Dhahran Techno Valley (DTV)
- List of things named after Saudi kings
- List of universities and colleges in Saudi Arabia
