= Arab National Liberation Front =

Saudi opposition movement

The Arab National Liberation Front (Arabic: جبهة التحرير الوطني العربية, abbreviated ANLF) was an exile-based Saudi opposition movement. ANLF was founded in Cairo in December 1962, through the merger of the National Liberation Front(جبهة التحرير الوطني) and the Free Princes Movement. Talal bin Abdulaziz became the general secretary of ANLF. The formation of a 15-member political bureau was announced when the organization was founded.

The ANLF had a politically mixed membership, gathering Talal's Egypt-based Free Princes Movement, Nasserists, Ba'athists, the Beirut-based Organization of Saudi Communists and Shia religious leaders. The ANLF was formed as a competitor to the Union of the Peoples of the Arabian Peninsula (UPAP), a group that was founded by Saudi dissident Nasser Al Saeed to confront the Saudi regime militarily via Yemen. However, in 1962 the UPAP joined the ANLF, although it lasted for a short time.

The programme of ANLF called for a referendum on the question of the role of the monarchy, constitutional democratic reforms, gender equality, land reform, non-alignment in international affairs and revision of oil agreements. The ANLF had a regular column in the Beirut publication al-Kifah, called 'Voice of the Front'. Declarations in the name of ANLF were broadcast on Egyptian, Syrian and Yemeni radio stations, calling for the overthrow of the Saudi regime.

In August 1963 Talal's group broke away from ANLF and begun to seek reconciliation with the royal house, after which the NLF reconstituted itself. The NLF continued to function until August 1974, eventually being replaced by the Communist Party in Saudi Arabia in 1975.
