= Madawi bint Abdulaziz Al Saud =

Saudi royal (1939–2017)

- Born: 1939; Riyadh, Saudi Arabia
- Died: 27 November 2017 (aged 77–78)
- Burial: Al Adl cemetery, Mecca
- Spouse: Saad bin Mohammed bin Abdulaziz
Names
- Madawi bint Abdulaziz bin Abdul Rahman Al Saud
- Dynasty: Al Saud
- Father: King Abdulaziz
- Mother: Munaiyir

Madawi bint Abdulaziz Al Saud (Arabic: مضاوي بنت عبدالعزيز آل سعود;1939 – 27 November 2017) was a member of the House of Saud. She was the daughter of King Abdulaziz, and was the full sister of Prince Talal and Prince Nawwaf.

== Biography ==
Princess Madawi was born in Qasr Al Hukm, Riyadh, in 1939. Her parents were King Abdulaziz and Munaiyir, an Armenian woman whose family escaped from the Ottoman Empire. In 1921 Munaiyir, aged 12, was presented by the emir of Unayzah to 45-year-old Abdulaziz. She remained illiterate all her life and converted to Islam. Munaiyir was regarded by British diplomats in Saudi Arabia as one of King Abdulaziz’s favourite wives and was known for her intelligence and beauty. She died in December 1991.

Princess Madawi had two full-brothers, Talal bin Abdulaziz and Nawwaf bin Abdulaziz. During the early 1960s she and her mother urged Prince Talal to return to Saudi Arabia who had been living in Cairo due to his involvement in Free Princes movement.

She had some business investments and had a petroleum marketing company, Princess Madawi bint Abdulaziz Petroleum Marketing Co.

Princess Madawi married Prince Saad bin Mohammed bin Abdulaziz bin Saud bin Faisal who was a member of the Mohammed branch of Saudi royal family. Her husband was assassinated in Iraq in January 1986 at the age of 55.

Princess Madawi died on 27 November 2017. She was buried after evening prayers at the Grand Mosque in Mecca. Among the royals attending the funeral were her half-brothers Ahmed bin Abdulaziz and Mamdouh bin Abdulaziz and her nephews Khalid bin Faisal, Mohammed bin Nawwaf, Mishaal bin Majid and Abdullah bin Bandar.
