= Ahmed bin Abdullah Al Thunayan =

Turkish-born Saudi royal and advisor to King Abdulaziz (1889–1923)

- Born: 1889; Istanbul, Ottoman Empire
- Died: 1923 (aged 33–34); Istanbul
- Ahmed bin Abdullah bin Abdullah bin Thunayan bin Ibrahim bin Thunayan Al Saud
- House: House of Saud
- Father: Abdullah bin Abdullah bin Thunayan Al Saud
- Mother: Tazeruh Hanım

Ahmed bin Abdullah Al Thunayan (Arabic: أحمد بن عبد الله آل ثنيان; 1889–1923) was a Turkish-born Saudi royal and government official who was one of the advisors to Abdulaziz, Emir of Nejd, who later founded the Kingdom of Saudi Arabia. He was the paternal uncle of Iffat Al Thunayan, spouse of King Faisal.

== Origins and early life ==
Prince Ahmed's family were the descendants of Thunayan, one of the brothers of Muhammad bin Saud, who is the patriarch of the House of Saud. Ahmed's father was Abdullah bin Abdullah bin Thunayan Al Saud, who was captured by the Ottomans in Bombay and sent to Istanbul in August 1880. He was appointed to the royal court there and was a member of the Ottoman Council of State in the 1880s and 1890s. Ahmed's mother was a Cherkess-origin Turkish woman named Tazeruh. His paternal grandfather, Abdullah bin Thunayan, ruled the Emirate of Nejd from 1841 to 1843.

Prince Ahmed was born in 1889 in Istanbul and raised there. He had a twin-sister, Jawhara, and two brothers, Mohammed and Suleiman. Mohammed was the father of Iffat, who married the future King Faisal in the 1930s.

== Career and activities ==
Just before World War I, Prince Ahmed went to Arabia and became a private secretary of Emir Abdulaziz. In March 1913, he met with the Ottoman governor of Baghdad, Cemal Pasha, as an envoy of Abdulaziz to eliminate the tensions between Abdulaziz and Sharif Hussein. Prince Ahmed headed the Saudi delegations which met with Sharif Hussein's staff following the establishment of the Kingdom of Hejaz in 1916. Over time, Prince Ahmed became Abdulaziz's chief foreign affairs advisor and acted as Saudi foreign minister. Prince Ahmed, together with Abdullah Al Qusaibi, another advisor of Abdulaziz, accompanied Prince Faisal (later King Faisal) during his official visit to London and Paris in 1919. Prince Ahmed's mission in this visit was to transmit the demands of Abdulaziz to British officials. Through Prince Ahmed, Abdulaziz asked the British to exert pressure on Sharif Hussain to allow Najdi people to go on pilgrimage. Prince Ahmed and Sharif Hussain's son Abdullah managed to sign a peace and friendship agreement in February 1920 in Baghdad, which lasted only for a short time. Prince Ahmed was accompanied by Abdullah Al Damluji in this visit.

On 1 May 1922, Prince Ahmed represented Abdulaziz in the Conference of Al Muhammarah, which was held to resolve the problematic Saudi-Iraqi border issues. Despite the objections of Abdulaziz, Prince Ahmed signed the treaty of al Muhammarah, which led to his dismissal from the post. Abdulaziz did not ratify the treaty and informed the British High Commissioner B. H. Bourdillon that Prince Ahmed had no authority to sign it. Following this incident, Prince Ahmed was replaced by Abdullah Al Damluji as chief foreign affairs advisor.

== Personal life and death ==
Prince Ahmed was fluent in Turkish, Arabic, English and German. He died in Istanbul in 1923 shortly after his return from Saudi Arabia. However, Joseph A. Kechichian argues that he died in 1921 which contradicts with the fact that he participated in the Conference of Al Muhammarah in May 1922.

=== In popular culture ===
Prince Ahmed was featured by Rubén Ochandiano in the 2019 film on King Faisal entitled Born a King.
