= Arabian Peninsula People's Union =

Arabian Peninsula People's Union اتحاد الشعب في الجزيرة العربية
- Leader: Nasser Al Saeed
- Founder: Nasser Al Saeed
- Founded: 1959
- Dissolved: ~1980s/1990s
- Headquarters: Beirut; Ha'il
- Ideology: Nasserism; Scientific Socialism
- Political position: Left-wing

The Arabian Peninsula People's Union (Arabic: اتحاد الشعب في الجزيرة العربية) was a Nasserist political party in Saudi Arabia. The APPU was founded in 1959 by Nasser Al Saeed whilst in exile in Beirut. Saeed had been exiled due to his leadership of the ARAMCO strikes in 1956. The APPU was regarded as one of the most important and most diverse opposition groups.

== History ==
=== Origins ===
The party had its origins in the Federation of the Sons of the Arabian Peninsula (FSAP); a Saudi opposition group formed in the late 1950s in Cairo. Unlike the Arab Liberation Front formed by Prince Talal bin Abdulaziz Al Saud in April 1958, the FSAP was mostly composed of members of Saudi Arabia's working class, and advocated the violent overthrow of the Saudi Government. The FSAP moved to Sana'a in North Yemen, from where it conducted attacks on Saudi Arabia.

=== Guerrilla warfare campaign ===
Founded in 1959, the party was historically relatively small, and never posed much of a serious threat to the Saudi Government. Until Saudi Arabia and Egypt patched up relations in 1967, APPU tried to wage guerrilla warfare against the Saudi government. In 1966 the party began a campaign of sabotage, and bombings. In particular, the party was accused of involvement in a bombing outside the Saudi Arabian Defence Ministry in Riyadh on 11 February 1967. The 11 February attack took place amid a spate of bombings targeting the Ministry. In March 1967 seventeen people, accused of involvement in the APPU armed struggle, were publicly executed in Riyadh. Another wave of arrests of party members from 1969 to 1971 severely weakened the party. The party's popularity also declined following the death of Gamal Abdel Nasser and the subsequent decline of the popularity of Nasserism. Although Sa'id was based in Beirut, the party structure within Saudi Arabia was based in Ha'il.

Several former members of the APPU went on to play key parts in the formation of the People's Democratic Party and the Arab Socialist Action Party.

=== Grand Mosque seizure and disappearance of Al Saeed ===
Party leader Nasser Al Saeed regained a degree of prominence following the Grand Mosque Seizure. Al Saeed expressed public support for the seizure, which he described as a “people’s revolution,” and claimed the true intent of the seizure was to establish a democratic republic. He even went so far as to claim responsibility for planning the incident and claimed that fighting was not just restricted to Mecca, but had instead been going on in other places, such as Tabuk, Medina, Najran and parts of Najd. This timeline of events was adopted by Alexei Vassiliev, amongst others. The Saudi authorities were alarmed by Al Saeed's claims, and on 17 December 1979 Saeed mysteriously disappeared in Beirut, never to reappear. Although his claims are now largely regarded as untrue, leftists were right in pointing out that the groups responsible for the seizure were largely composed of members of Saudi Arabia's marginalized communities. Saudi Arabia denied any role in his disappearance. Others, such as Kat Bird, claimed that Al Saeed was captured by Saudi Intelligence agents in December 1979 and then shipped to Riyadh in a crate, where he was imprisoned for many years.

=== Demise ===
Later in the 1980s, the party was one of the several Leftist and Islamic opposition groups that the Saudi Government was able to neutralise through cooption and accommodation. The party was also undermined by the defeat of Saddam Hussein in the Gulf War, the collapse of most Marxist governments, and Egyptian-Syrian cooperation with the US. These events undermined traditional left-wing Arab parties, which were instead eclipsed by Islamists.

As such the party was dissolved sometime in the late 1980s or early 1990s.

== Ideology ==
The party was largely regarded as Nasserist in outlook, although the APPU had possibly the most politically diverse membership of the Saudi opposition groups. The party was supported by Egypt.

The party defined itself as a revolutionary Arab organisation based on the premise of scientific-socialism. The party was also dedicated to the overthrow of the Saudi monarchy, which it viewed as corrupt, and was committed to the political unification of the Arabian peninsula.

== See also ==
- List of political parties in Saudi Arabia
