= Organization of Saudi Communists =

Organization of Saudi Communists منظمة الشيوعيين السعوديين
- Succeeded by: Communist Party in Saudi Arabia
- Ideology: Communism; Marxism-Leninism
- Political position: Far-Left

The Organization of Saudi Communists (Arabic: منظمة الشيوعيين السعوديين) was a political party in Saudi Arabia. The OSC was formed in Beirut by communists involved in the Arab National Liberation Movement; a coalition of Saudi opposition groups, including Talal bin Abdulaziz Al Saud. The OSC was formed so that Saudi Communists could retain a degree of autonomy whilst still being involved with the larger Movement. Abdulaziz as-Sunaid was one of the founders of the organization. The group was short-lived, however, with most Saudi Communists remaining under the banner of the National Liberation Front (Arabic: جبهة التحرير الوطني), which later morphed into the Communist Party in Saudi Arabia.

== See also ==
- List of political parties in Saudi Arabia
