= Nasser Al Saeed =

Saudi dissident writer (1923–unknown)

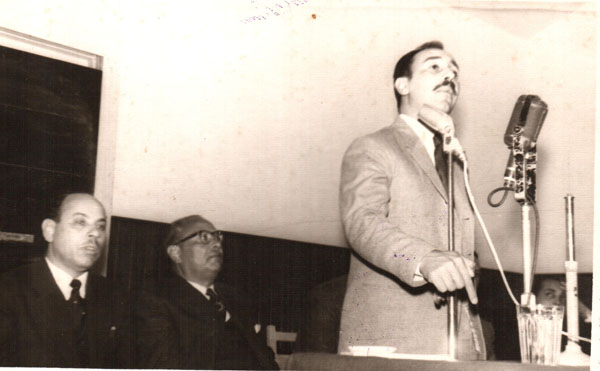
- Nasser Al Saeed in 1956
- Born: 1923
- Disappeared: 17 December 1979 (aged 56); Beirut
- Status: Missing for 46 years, 10 months and 30 days
- Occupation: Writer
- Years active: ?-December 1979
- Known for: Criticisms against House of Saud; Founder of the Arabian Peninsula People's Union
- Notable work: Tarikh Al Sa'ud (1963)

Nasser Al Saeed (born 1923) was a Saudi Arabian writer and the founder of the Arabian Peninsula People's Union (APPU). He was one of the most significant critics of the Saudi royal family. He was kidnapped in December 1979 in Beirut, Lebanon, and his whereabouts have been unknown since then. His case is the first reported instance of the state-sponsored abduction by Saudi Arabia.

== Biography ==
Al Saeed was born in 1923 to a Hail-based family belonging to the Shammar tribe. He was employed in Aramco.

Al Saeed took part in protests against the Saudi royal establishment in 1947 due to the inefficiency of Saudi Arabia and other Arab countries to end the attempts to establish an Israeli state in the Middle East. The protests became much more intense following the establishment of Israel in 1948 and the recognition of the state by the U.S., which had close ties with Saudi Arabia. His opposition continued in the 1950s through radio broadcast. Al Saeed was one of the leaders of the strike among Aramco workers in 1953. Following this incident he was put under house arrest in Hail. At the end of the same year and in the early days of 1954 Al Saeed and other strike leaders formed the National Reform Front. They were secular and leftist and had connections with both Najdi and Hijazi people. Following the riots in 1956, Al Saeed left Saudi Arabia and settled in Damascus, Syria, where he established the Nasserist Union of People of the Arabian Peninsula (ittihad sha'b al-jazira al-'arabiyya) in 1959 which was renamed as the Union of the Sons of the Arabian Peninsula. The Union became a member of the Arab National Liberation Front in 1960 which also included the Free Princes Movement founded by the Saudi royals led by Prince Talal bin Abdulaziz Al Saud. Al Saeed established the APPU in 1960.

Al Saeed settled in Sanaa, North Yemen, where he founded an office for the APPU in 1963. Later he left the Arab National Liberation Front and returned to Syria.

=== Work ===
His book, Tarikh Al Sa'ud (Arabic: History of Al Saud), was published in 1965. In the book Al Saeed claimed that the Saudi ambassador to Egypt, Abdullah bin Ibrahim Al Mufaddal, asked Muhammad Al Tamimi in 1943 to create a fake family tree for the Al Saud family and the family of Muhammad Abd al Wahhab, founder of Wahhabism, and to relate them to the origins of Muhammad. It is also argued in the book that the Al Saud have Jewish roots. Ghassan Salamé remarks that Tarikh Al Sa'ud is not objective and lacks the necessary evidence to support its strong claims against the Saudi royal family.

== Disappearance and aftermath ==
During his visit to Beirut for interviews with Arab and Western media, Al Saeed was abducted in the Hamra district of Beirut by Saudi agents on 17 December 1979. Just before his kidnapping in an interview with Ad Dustur Al Saeed praised those who seized Great Mosque in Mecca in November 1979. He described the seizure as a revolution that was the result of newly emerging controversies in Saudi Arabia. He added that the incident was organized by the opposition forces and carried out by military officials and tribesmen. He added that each revolutionary Muslim had a right to capture the Ka'ba as Muhammad did in order to satisfy his conscience.

In the kidnapping of Al Saeed Abu al Zaim, one of the PLO's senior figures, helped Saudi agents. The mediator of this collaboration was the PLO leader Yasser Arafat who was paid by the Saudi authorities for it. Madawi Al Rashid argued in 2018 that Ali Shaher, Saudi ambassador to Lebanon, also assisted the capture of Al Saeed.

Al Saeed was taken to his native country by the agents, and his fate has been unknown since then. Based on the Arab media reports Ghassan Salamé states that Al Saeed was executed immediately after he was brought to Saudi Arabia. Saudi Arabia denied any role in his disappearance.

== Personal life ==
Al Saeed was married and had children.

== See also ==
- List of kidnappings
- List of people who disappeared
