= Wanda Jablonski =

American journalist (1920–1992)

Wanda Jablonski (23 August 1920, in Czechoslovakia – 28 January 1992, in New York City) was an American journalist who covered the global petroleum industry. She was called "the most influential oil journalist of her time" in Daniel Yergin's The Prize.

== Early life and education ==
Jablonski was the daughter of Polish petroleum geologist Eugene Jablonski, and was immersed in the oil industry throughout her childhood. She studied at St George's School, Harpenden in England until July 1937, where she gained her school certificate and got the form prize in July 1938 before leaving to study in America.

She and her parents traveled widely, and although she became an American citizen, she developed great sympathy for other cultures – an attribute which as an adult enabled her to make deep contacts across the world oil industry, from the multinational oil companies to the leaders of oil-producing countries.

Jablonski earned a B.A. from Cornell University in 1942 and an M.A. from the Columbia University Graduate School of Journalism the following year.

== Career ==
Jablonski began as the oil editor at the Journal of Commerce, where she made her mark with a 1948 interview in Caracas with Juan Pablo Pérez Alfonso, then the Venezuelan oil minister, which cleverly synthesized the developing nations' viewpoint, in those days rarely heard in the Western hemisphere. She moved to Petroleum Week journal in 1954 and cemented her reputation, speaking on equal terms with oil ministers and company chairmen. A rare woman in a man's world, she was known throughout the oil industry simply as "Wanda".

She is credited with arranging the 1959 Cairo meeting where Abdullah Tariki, Juan Pablo Pérez Alfonso, and other oil ministers of Middle East signed the "Gentleman's Agreement," or Mehdi Pact (Maadi Pact - after the yacht club in Maadi) a precursor of Organization of the Petroleum Exporting Countries (OPEC), the international organization whose mission is to coordinate the policies of the oil-producing countries. In 1960, Jablonski reported to oil company executives that there was a marked hostility toward the West and a growing outcry against "absentee landlordism" in the Middle East. "From offices in London, New York, and Pittsburgh, top executives of oil companies were controlling destinies of Middle East oil-producing states." Ignoring her warning, in August 1960, the major oil companies unilaterally reduced the prices that were used to calculate how much revenue the producing countries received. As a direct result, in September 1960, representatives from oil-producing countries met and formed OPEC.

She then founded Petroleum Intelligence Weekly in 1961, the journal which came to be known as "the bible of the oil industry", and ran it until 1988.

Jablonski died in 1992 of heart failure at the age of 71.
