= List of political parties in Saudi Arabia =

This is a list of political parties in the Saudi Arabia. All parties listed are illegal, as Saudi Arabia is an absolute monarchy with a government dominated by the royal family. According to The Economist's 2010 Democracy Index, the Saudi government was the seventh most authoritarian regime from among the 167 countries rated.

== List of political parties ==
| Name (English) | Name (Arabic) | Acronym | Leader | Political position and ideologies |
|---|---|---|---|---|
| National Assembly Party | حزب التجمع الوطني | NAAS | Yahya Assiri | Big tent Parliamentary democracy |
| Umma Islamic Party | حزب الأمة الإسلامي | UIP | Abdullah al-Salim | Islamism; Reformism; Shura |
| Hizb ut-Tahrir | Hizb ut-Tahrir حزب التحرير | HT | Ata Abu Rashta | Islamism; Caliphalism |
| Hezbollah Al-Hejaz | Hezbollah Al-Hejaz حزب الله الحجاز | HH | Abdel Karim Hussein Mohamed al-Nasser | Shi'a; Islamism; Wilayat al-Faqih |
| Movement for Islamic Reform in Arabia (Defunct) | الحركة الإسلامية للإصلاح | MIRA | Sa'ad al-Faqih | Islamism |
| Arab Socialist Action Party – Arabian Peninsula (Dissolved) | Hizb al`Amal al Ishtirakiy al-`Arabiy-Al-Jazira al`Arabiyyah حزب العمل الاشتراكي العربي ـ الجزيرة العربية | ASAP-AP | - | Marxism; Arab nationalism |
| Arabian Peninsula People's Union (Dissolved) | اتحاد الشعب في الجزيرة العربية | APPU | Nasser al-Saeed | Left-wing; Nasserism; Republicanism |
| Communist Party in Saudi Arabia (Dissolved) | al-Hizb ash-Shuyu'i fi as-Sa'udiyah الحزب الشيوعي في السعودية | CPSA | - | Far-left; Communism; Republicanism Marxism-Leninism |
| Organization of Saudi Communists (Dissolved) | منظمة الشيوعيين السعوديين | OSC | - | Far-Left; Communism |

== See also ==
- List of political parties by country
- Politics of Saudi Arabia
