= Abdullah bin Abdullah Al Saud =

Member of the House of Saud (born 1843)

- Abdullah Pasha
- Born: July 1843; Riyadh
- Died: Unknown; Constantinople
- Spouse: Tazeruh Hanım
- Issue: Mohammad; Ahmed; Al Jawhara; Sulaiman; Abdul Rahman; Abdul Qadir
- Abdullah bin Abdullah bin Thunayan bin Ibrahim bin Thunayan
- House: House of Saud
- Father: Abdullah bin Thunayan Al Saud

Abdullah bin Abdullah Al Saud (Arabic: عبد الله بن عبد الله آل سعود, romanized: ʿAbd Allāh ibn ʿAbd Allāh Āl Suʿūd; born July 1843), later known as Abdullah Pasha, was a member of the Al Thunayan family, a branch of the House of Saud. He was a son of Abdullah bin Thunayan, Emir of Nejd.

Abdullah was born in July 1843, on the day his father died. As an adult, he made attempts to rebuild the Second Saudi State that his ancestors had ruled over. He eventually ended up in the Ottoman capital of Constantinople, where he ostensibly spent the rest of his life. He later served on the Ottoman Council of State. He also served the Ottoman government as an arbitrator for its relations with Arab tribes living within the empire. Abdullah was the paternal grandfather of Iffat bint Mohammad Al Thunayan, the consort of King Faisal of Saudi Arabia.

== Life ==
Abdullah bin Abdullah Al Saud was the son of Abdullah bin Thunayan, Emir of Nejd from 1841 to 1843. Abdullah bin Thunayan became emir after overthrowing his cousin Khalid bin Saud in 1841. In 1843 Abdullah was overthrown by another cousin, Faisal bin Turki, who imprisoned him in Al Masmak fort. Emir Abdullah died in July of that year. One of his sons was born the same day he died, and due to this he was named Abdullah after his father.

In 1879 Abdullah bin Abdullah headed to Constantinople, hoping to gain control over territory in the Al-Hasa region which the Ottomans had seized from his Al Saud relatives. While he was going towards Constantinople he sought the support of British authorities in Damascus and Cairo, among other places, but nothing came of this. In August 1880, he reached Constantinople, where he became known as Abdullah Pasha.

Abdullah Pasha was a member of the Ottoman Council of State in the 1880s and 1890s under Sultan Abdul Hamid II. He acted as a mediator between the Ottoman government and the Arab tribes living in the Ottoman territories. He was instrumental in educating students from the Arab provinces of Hejaz, Yemen, and Trablusgarb at the Harbiye military academy and at the Mekteb-i Aşiret-i Humayun in Constantinople.

== Personal life ==
While Abdullah was in Constantinople, he married a Turkish Circassian woman named Tazeruh and had four children: Mohammad, the twins Ahmed and Al Jawhara, and Sulaiman. Abdullah also had two sons from a second marriage named Abdul Rahman and Abdul Qadir. Abdullah's son Mohammad became a physician in the Ottoman army and was the father of Queen Iffat, the wife of King Faisal. Another of his sons, Ahmed bin Abdullah Al Thunayan, was an advisor to King Abdulaziz of Saudi Arabia (founder of the Third Saudi State, the Kingdom of Saudi Arabia).
