= The Sleeping Prince =

The Sleeping Prince may refer to

- The Sleeping Prince (fairy tale), Greek fairy tale collected by Georgios A. Megas in Folktales of Greece
- The Sleeping Prince (play), 1953 play by Terence Rattigan
- Al-Waleed bin Khalid Al-Saud (1989–2025), a member of the Saudi royal family described as the "Sleeping Prince" due to a longterm coma
- The Sleeping Prince, video game by Signal Studios
- The Sleeping Prince, the second book in The Sin Eater's Daughter trilogy by Melinda Salisbury
- "Sleeping Prince", a song by IU on the Last Fantasy album
