= Abdullah Tariki =

Saudi politician (1919–1997)

Minister of Petroleum and Mineral Resources
- In office December 1960 – 9 March 1962
- Prime Minister: King Saud
- Preceded by: Office established
- Succeeded by: Ahmed Zaki Yamani

Personal details
- Born: Abdullah ibn Hamoud Tariki; 19 March 1919 Zulfi, Emirate of Nejd and Hasa
- Died: 7 September 1997 (aged 78) Cairo, Egypt
- Education: Cairo University; University of Texas

Abdullah Tariki (19 March 1919 – 7 September 1997) (Arabic: عبدالله الطريقي), also known by the alternate spelling of his last name as al-Turayqi and nicknamed the Red Sheikh, was a Saudi politician and government official. He served as the first oil minister of Saudi Arabia, appointed by King Saud, and was co-founder of the Organization of Petroleum Exporting Countries (OPEC).

Historian Eugene Rogan called him "one of the first Arab oil experts." In April 1959, Time magazine described him as "the unquestioned spokesman of the new generation of Arab experts on oil."

== Early life and education ==
Tariki was born on 19 March 1919 in Al Zulfi, Najd. His father was a Najdi townsman and a camel owner who organized caravans between Saudi Arabia and Kuwait. His mother was a bedouin. One of Tariki's childhood friends was Mustafa Wahba, son of Hafiz Wahba and the founding and long-term secretary general of the Communist Party in Saudi Arabia.

Tariki received his early education in Kuwait and in Cairo. In total, he spent twelve years studying in Egypt. He received a bachelor's degree in geology and chemistry from Cairo University in 1944. He graduated from the University of Texas in 1947, earning a master's degree in petroleum engineering and geology. He was also trained at the Texas Oil Company after graduation before returning to Saudi Arabia.

== Career and activities ==
After his graduation, Tariki was employed as a geologist for the Texas Oil Company in Texas and California. He returned to Saudi Arabia in 1948 and began to work at the ministry of finance office in Dammam from May 1953 to December 1954. He served as an interpreter at the initial phase of his career at the ministry. In December 1954, Tariki was appointed director-general of petroleum and mineral affairs in the ministry of finance and national economy. This "made him the highest-ranked Saudi in the oil industry" at the time.

Tariki's work at the directorate involved processing the petroleum production statistics provided by the Arabian American Oil Company (Aramco), and analysis summaries were then presented to the Saudi royal family. Tariki represented Saudi Arabia in the first Arab Petroleum Congress held in April 1959. He was named one of two representatives of the Saudi government as directors of the Aramco in May 1959. The other one was Hafiz Wahba. They were the first Saudi officials at the company.

Tariki was one of the earliest critics of Aramco, arguing that the US companies should consult more with Saudi officials in exploring, pumping and selling of oil. He was a Nasserite, as well as an Arab nationalist. He called for a constitutional monarchy in Saudi Arabia and the nationalization of Arab oil. To achieve this goal, he and Venezuela's mines minister Juan Pablo Perez Alfonso strongly supported the foundation of the OPEC and eventually became their founding members in September 1960.

The ministry of petroleum and mineral resources was created in December 1960, and Tariki was appointed the first oil minister. His confidants in the government included King Saud's advisor Abdulaziz Al Muammar and Prince Mutaib bin Abdulaziz. Tariki joined Prince Talal bin Abdulaziz's camp, Free Princes Movement, in 1961, and they accused Crown Prince Faisal, later King Faisal, of corruption. Tariki became a powerful ally of the movement. He claimed on evidence that Kamal Adham, who was the brother-in-law of Prince Faisal, got 2% of the profits of the Arabian Oil Company that had been cofounded by Saudi Arabia and Japan.

=== Dismissal ===
Tariki was removed from office by Prince Faisal when the latter was functioning as the acting head of the state as a result of the clash between him and King Saud in March 1962. More specifically, King Saud dismissed him and four other members of the cabinet following his announcement of the constitution which had been developed by Free Princes movement members with the help of Egyptian lawyers. The Sudairi Seven, led by Prince Fahd, were very influential in this campaign against Tariki and others. According to political scientist Jeff Colgan, "the underlying problem was his nationalist ideology, though other events triggered his dismissal. His nationalist vision for the oil sector had become embarrassing to the Saudis who sought to cement their relationship with the United States." The other cabinet ministers who were asked to resign from the office included Hasan Nasif, Abdallah Al Dabbagh, Ibrahim Al Suwayil and Nasir Al Manqur. Tariki was succeeded by Ahmed Zaki Yamani as oil minister, and Yamani sacked Tariki also from Aramco's board.

== Later years ==
Following his dismissal, Tariki went to exile and settled in Beirut. In January 1963, he and Lebanese oil expert Nicholas Sarkis founded an oil consulting firm in Beirut. Tariki also launched a journal there, Arab Oil and Gas, and contributed to Al Anwar, a Lebanese daily. One of his articles in Al Anwar was an open letter to the Shah of Iran dated 19 May 1969.

Muammar Gaddafi sought Tariki's advice on national oil policy in the aftermath of the 1969 Libyan revolution.

Tariki could visit Saudi Arabia only after the death of King Faisal in 1975. Later, Tariki settled in Cairo.

== Personal life and death ==
When Tariki was attending the University of Texas, he married an American woman. They later divorced in Saudi Arabia. Tariki died of a heart attack on 7 September 1997 in Cairo at the age of 78. His body was taken to Saudi Arabia for burial.

== Honors ==
- Order of Francisco de Miranda, 1960, Venezuela.
