= Abdulaziz Al Muammar =

Saudi Arabian government official (1919–1984)

Ambassador of Saudi Arabia to Switzerland
- In office 1961–1963

Personal details
- Born: Abdulaziz bin Ibrahim Al Muammar; 1919
- Died: 1984 (aged 64–65) Dammam, Saudi Arabia
- Education: American College of Beirut

Abdulaziz Al Muammar (Arabic: عبد العزيز المعمر; 1919–1984) was a Saudi Arabian technocrat who served as one of King Saud's advisors and an ambassador of Saudi Arabia to Switzerland. Besides he is one of the leading figures of the first generation Saudi Arabian intellectuals.

== Early life and education ==
Al Muammar was born in Iraq in 1919 and hailed from a Hijazi family. His father, Ibrahim, served as an advisor to King Abdulaziz Ibn Saud following the foundation of Saudi Arabia in 1932 and was one of the confidants of Ibn Saud.

Al Muammar received secondary education in Cairo and a bachelor's degree in economics from American University of Beirut in 1948.

== Career ==
Al Muammar started his career as a translator at the royal court of King Abdulaziz in 1948. In 1953 a labor strike emerged at Aramco, and King Saud asked Al Muammar to head a committee to review the Aramco workers' demands and to develop suggestions to improve their working conditions. In order to carry out his mission he went to the Eastern Province where Aramco was based. There he met some leftist figures such as Ishaq Al Sheikh Yaqub and Muhammad Al Hoshan with whom he established a leftist nationalist organization called the National Reform Front (Jabhat al-Islah al-Watani). Al Muammar presented his suggestions after his visit to King Saud who founded the Work and Workers' Office following these suggestions. The office was a neutral body commissioned with protecting the rights of Aramco workers, and Al Muammar was appointed by King Saud as the first president of the office despite the objections of Aramco management.

Al Muammar was arrested in 1955 while he was working at the Ministry of Finance due to his alleged Baathist views. His arrest was requested by Crown Prince Faisal based on the allegations fabricated against him by Aramco officials. He was released from prison in February 1956 and continued his political activism in the National Reform Front.

Al Muammar was named as an advisor of King Saud in 1958 and became one of his closest advisors. At the end of 1960 Al Muammar was the most prominent non-royal in Saudi government. Following the resignation of Crown Prince Faisal from the post of premiership King Saud declared himself as prime minister and formed a cabinet. Al Muammar attended the cabinet meetings although he did not hold any government position. Finance Minister Prince Talal bin Abdulaziz and Oil Minister Abdullah Tariki objected his attendance to the meetings. During the same period the US Ambassador to Saudi Arabia told King Saud that Al Muammar had communist views after which he was expelled from the royal court. Despite the objections of Prince Talal and Abdullah Tariki King Saud named Al Muammar as the Saudi Ambassador to Switzerland in 1961. However, when Crown Prince Faisal assumed the premiership in 1963, he removed Al Muammar from the post, and he returned to Saudi Arabia.

== Arrest and death ==
Soon after his return to Saudi Arabia Al Muammar was imprisoned in al Hufuf and released only after the assassination of King Faisal when new ruler, King Khaled, issued a general amnesty in 1975. During his 12-year imprisonment Al Muammar became blind, and King Khalid sent him to Spain for the treatment. Al Muammar died in Dammam in 1984.

== Legacy ==
Ishaq Al Sheikh Yaqub published the biography of Al Muammar entitled Abdulaziz Al Muammar: The Memory of a Nation.
