= Mustafa Wahba =

Saudi Arabian economist and general secretary of the Communist Party in Saudi Arabia

Secretary General of the Communist Party in Saudi Arabia
- In office 1975–1991
- Preceded by: Office established
- Succeeded by: Office abolished

Deputy finance minister
- In office 1960–1962

Personal details
- Born: Kuwait
- Parents: Sheikha bint Hussain Al Masoud (mother); Hafiz Wahba (father)
- Education: Cambridge University

Mustafa Wahba (Arabic: مصطفى وهبة) was a Saudi Arabian economist who served as deputy finance minister from 1960 to 1962. In addition, he was the first and long-term secretary general of the Communist Party in Saudi Arabia between 1975 and 1991.

== Biography ==
Mustafa Wahba was born in Kuwait, and his father was Hafiz Wahba who was one of the advisors of King Abdulaziz and was the Saudi Ambassador to the United Kingdom. His mother was a Kuwaiti woman, Sheikha bint Hussain Al Masoud. He had two full-sisters. Abdullah Tariki who became the Saudi minister of oil in 1960 was one of Mustafa Wahba's childhood friends, and they first met in Kuwait.

Mustafa Wahba started his education in Egypt and attended Victoria College in Alexandria. He received a bachelor's degree in economics from Cambridge University. Following his graduation he began to work in the Saudi embassy in London where his father was the Saudi Ambassador and then, worked in the Ministry of Foreign Affairs in Jeddah. Next, he was employed in Aramco in the late 1950s and served as the deputy director general of petroleum and mineral affairs in the Eastern Province. However, he was fired soon due to his progressive ideas.

Mustafa Wahba was one of the supporters of the reformist royals and political figures, including Prince Talal and Abdullah Tariki. In 1960 Mustafa Wahba was appointed deputy finance minister by King Saud making him an assistant to Prince Talal, the minister of finance. The cabinet also included other reformists, including Abdullah Tariki. Wahba was removed from the office in 1962 when Crown Prince Faisal assumed the premiership again. Then Wahba dealt with the consulting business and stayed in Saudi Arabia until 1968 when King Faisal ordered him to leave the country. The King stripped Wahba and his family of their Saudi citizenship.

Wahba went to the Soviet Union and then, to Syria where he settled. Next, he went to Kuwait where he contributed to the establishment of the Communist Party in Saudi Arabia. He became the first secretary general of the party under the alias Mahdi Habib. He held the title from 1975 to 1991 when the party was dissolved. He was living in Amman, Jordan, at the beginning of the 2000s.

He married an Austrian woman from Graz with whom he had two daughters. Later he wed a Jordanian woman.
