= Yusuf Yasin =

Syrian-origin Saudi government official (1888–1962)

- يوسف ياسين
- Born: 1888; Latakia, Syria
- Died: 19 April 1962 (aged 73–74); Dhahran, Saudi Arabia
- Education: University of Jerusalem
- Occupations: Journalist; Royal adviser
- Years active: 1920s–1958
- Children: 8

Yusuf Yasin (also known as Yousuf Yassin; Arabic: يوسف ياسين; 1888 – 19 April 1962) was a Syrian journalist and politician who served in various capacities during the reign of King Abdulaziz and King Saud. He was among the advisers of King Abdulaziz who were employed to improve the decision-making process of the state. Yasin performed several roles in the Saudi government until his death in 1962.

== Early life and education ==
Yusuf Yasin was born in Latakia, Syria, in 1888. His parents were Fatima bint Abdullah Jamal and Shaikh Mohammad Yasin, and his grandfather was Ali Al Masri, probably an Egyptian immigrant to Syria.

Following religious education in Latakia Yasin graduated from the University of Jerusalem in 1911. He was also educated in Cairo where one of his tutors was Rashid Rida.

== Career and activities ==
Yasin worked as a teacher in Jerusalem in the Ottoman period and supported the pan-Arab views during World War I. He served in the court of Amir Faisal, son of Hussein bin Ali, King of Hejaz between 1917 and 1918. In 1920 Yasin began to work for Hussein bin Ali in Mecca who sent him to his another son Abdullah, Amir of Transjordan. However, he left Abdullah's service just six months after his appointment. Yasin cofounded a weekly nationalist newspaper in Jerusalem in 1921. His business associate was Mohammad Kamil Al Budari, and their paper was entitled Al Sabah.

Yasin left Syria due to the French occupation of the region due to his strong adherence to the independence of Syria and was part of a group called the Istiqlali network which also included another journalist Khayr al-Din al-Zirikli. Yasin began to work for the House of Saud in 1923 or in 1924. Shukri Al Quwatli, future president of Syria, was instrumental in Yasin's new career. Yasin intended to work as a teacher for the sons of King Abdulaziz. He first became the head of the political section of the royal court and private secretary to the King.

Yasin contributed to the establishment of a weekly paper in Mecca, Umm Al Qura, in 1924 of which he became the first editor-in-chief. The paper soon functioned as the official gazette of the country. He was made the political secretary of King Abdulaziz in 1926 and then, appointed an adviser to him in the 1930s. He was also head of the press bureau and accompanied the king in his meeting with Amir Faisal, King of Iraq, in February 1930.

Yasin became a Saudi citizen on 29 December 1930. He suggested the addition of the phrase al-Sa’udiyyah to the name of the country, Al-Mamlakah al-'Arabiyyah al-Sa’udiyyah, known as Saudi Arabia, in 1932. In 1937 he was part of the Saudi delegation who visited London to attend the coronation of King George VI. The same year while officially visiting Baghdad, Iraq, upon the request of King Abdulaziz Yasin attempted to contact with a German arms company owned by Otto Wolff to buy rifles. There Yasin also met with Fritz Grobba, Nazi Germany's ambassador to Iraq.

Yasin signed the extradition treaty between Kuwait and Saudi Arabia on behalf of the latter that established the Saudi–Kuwaiti neutral zone in 1942. The same year Yasin was the Saudi Arabian representative at the Arab League meeting in Alexandria, Kingdom of Egypt. He accompanied King Abdulaziz in his meeting with Franklin D. Roosevelt on 14 February 1945. Yasin signed a treaty of amity on behalf of Saudi Arabia with the Republic of China on 15 November 1946.

Yasin replaced Fuad Hamza as deputy foreign minister in 1951 when Hamza died. Between 1952 and 1955 Yasin was responsible for Saudi activities in the Buraimi Oasis and was a member of the Buraimi Arbitration Tribunal. Following the death of King Abdulaziz, Yasin served as the state minister and the advisor to King Saud, successor of the king. It was Yusuf Yasin who made an inauguration speech at the meeting of the council of ministers in the Murabba Palace on 7 March 1954. Yasin was removed from the post of deputy foreign minister by Crown Prince Faisal on 15 May 1958. Yasin's role as an aide to King Saud continued until his death in April 1962.

=== Views ===
Yasin had a pan-Arab stance, and one of his close companions was Rashid Rida, founder and editor of an influential conservative Egyptian publication, Al Manar. As mentioned above Rida was one of Yasin's teachers. Yasin was a major opponent of the close relations between Saudi Arabia and the United States, and also, had an anti-British approaches.

== Personal life and death ==
Yasin married twice and had eight children, five sons and three daughters. One of his sons, Anas Yasin, was Saudi ambassador to the United Nations, India, and Turkey. His other son, Hassan Yasin, was the advisor to the former Saudi foreign minister Saud bin Faisal Al Saud.

Yusuf Yasin died of cardiac arrest in Dhahran on 19 April 1962. However, an Egyptian newspaper Al Akhbar reported that Yasin was badly injured in an assassination attempt and died one day after the incident.

== Legacy ==
Joseph A. Kechichian wrote a book about Yusuf Yasin: The Arab Nationalist Advisor. Shaykh Yusuf Yassin of Sa’udi Arabia, which was released in December 2021.
