= Fuad Hamza =

Palestine-origin Saudi government official (1899–1951)

Personal details
- Born: Fuad Amin Hamza; 1899 Abey, Ottoman Empire
- Died: 1951 (aged 51–52)
- Education: American College of Beirut; Jerusalem Law School

Fuad Hamza (Arabic: فؤاد حمزة), also known as Fuad Bey Hamza, (1899–1951) was a Palestinian who served as ambassador of Saudi Arabia to France and as King Abdulaziz's adviser and representative. Hafiz Wahba and he were the first ambassadors of Saudi Arabia, the former in the United Kingdom and Hamza in France. In addition, they were among the advisers whom King Abdulaziz employed to improve the decision-making process of the state.

== Early life, origin and education ==
Fuad Hamza was born in Abey, Lebanon, in 1899. He was from Palestine, and The Times reported on 1 September 1936 that his family were from Ramallah. Clive Leatherdale argues that he was a Druze from Lebanon. Isadore Jay Gold also states that he was a Druze, but from Syria. Hamza was a graduate of the American College of Beirut and the Jerusalem Law School.

== Career and activities ==
Hamza worked as a teacher of English in Lebanon, Damascus and Jerusalem in the early 1920s. He joined the court of King Abdulaziz in Hejaz in December 1926. He was one of his personal advisers and first served him as a translator. Next he was made a member of the political executive committee of Hejaz at the Saudi royal court in 1928. He was appointed deputy foreign minister in 1930 replacing Abdullah Al Damluji in the post, an Iraqi adviser of King Abdulaziz. The same year Hamza also became a member of the permanent committee attached to the royal diwan. During this period he worked closely with Yusuf Yasin, another close adviser of the king. They both accompanied King Abdulaziz in his meeting with Amir Faisal, King of Iraq, in February 1930.

Following the establishment of the council of deputies in December 1931, Hamza was made one of its four members as the undersecretary of foreign affairs. Hamza had connections with the supporters of the Palestinian cause in Jerusalem and Transjordan during this period. Giovanni Persico, Fascist Italy's consul in Jeddah, transferred £5,000 to him to financially aid these groups. As the undersecretary of foreign affairs Hamza signed an amity treaty on behalf of Saudi Arabia with Egypt in Cairo on 7 May 1936. Through the treaty, Egypt recognized Saudi Arabia as an independent and sovereign state, and diplomatic relations between the two countries began. The same year King Abdulaziz named Hamza as his emissary to the Palestine issue, but Hamza could not attend the meetings due to his illness. However, Hamza met with David Ben-Gurion, chairman of the Zionist and Jewish Agency Executive, at his Beirut home on 13 April 1937. In this unofficial meeting Ben Gurion attempted to get information about King Abdulaziz's views on the formation of a Jewish state in the Middle East, and Hamza suggested him to meet with Ibn Saud as well as Crown Prince Saud and Yusuf Yasin during the latter's visit to London for the coronation of King George VI. Hamza visited Germany to negotiate arms sales and met with the Nazi officials in the period 23–27 August 1938.

Hamza participated in the London Conference held in January 1939 to discuss the future of the Palestine. He was part of the Saudi Arabian delegation along with Prince Faisal. Hamza was named as the Saudi ambassador to France in 1939. He represented Saudi Arabia in the Vichy Conference and the Ankara Conference held during World War II. Hamza attempted to coordinate a correspondence between King Abdulaziz and Adolf Hitler in the same period. In November 1941 the King sent him a telegram stating that his attempts would be harmful for Saudi Arabia, and ordered him to terminate all his relations with Nazi officials.

Following World War II Hamza was appointed Saudi envoy to the United States. In 1947 he was named as the minister of development. He worked at the Foreign Ministry of Saudi Arabia as deputy minister until his death in 1951. Yusuf Yasin replaced him in the post.

== Personal life, death and work ==
His brother, Tawfik, also worked at the Saudi royal court. Hamza died in 1951.

Hamza was fluent in English, Turkish and French. He wrote several books on Saudi Arabia, first of which was published in 1933. One of his books is about the Arab tribes, which was an authentic work on the topic.
