= Shubra Palace =

Historic building in Taif, Saudi Arabia

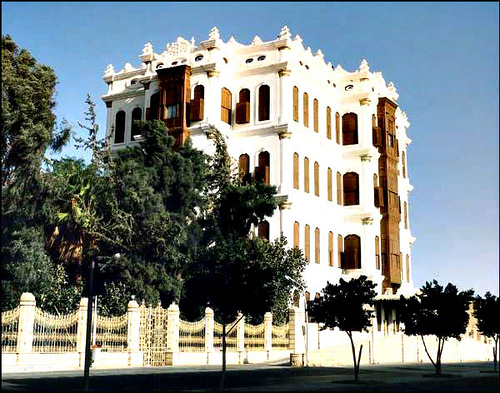
- Shubra Palace, Taif
- Interactive map of the Shubra Palace area

General information
- Architectural style: Ottoman architecture
- Location: Taif, Saudi Arabia
- Coordinates: 21°17′10.89″N 40°24′54.15″E
- Completed: 1858
- Client: Ali Pasha

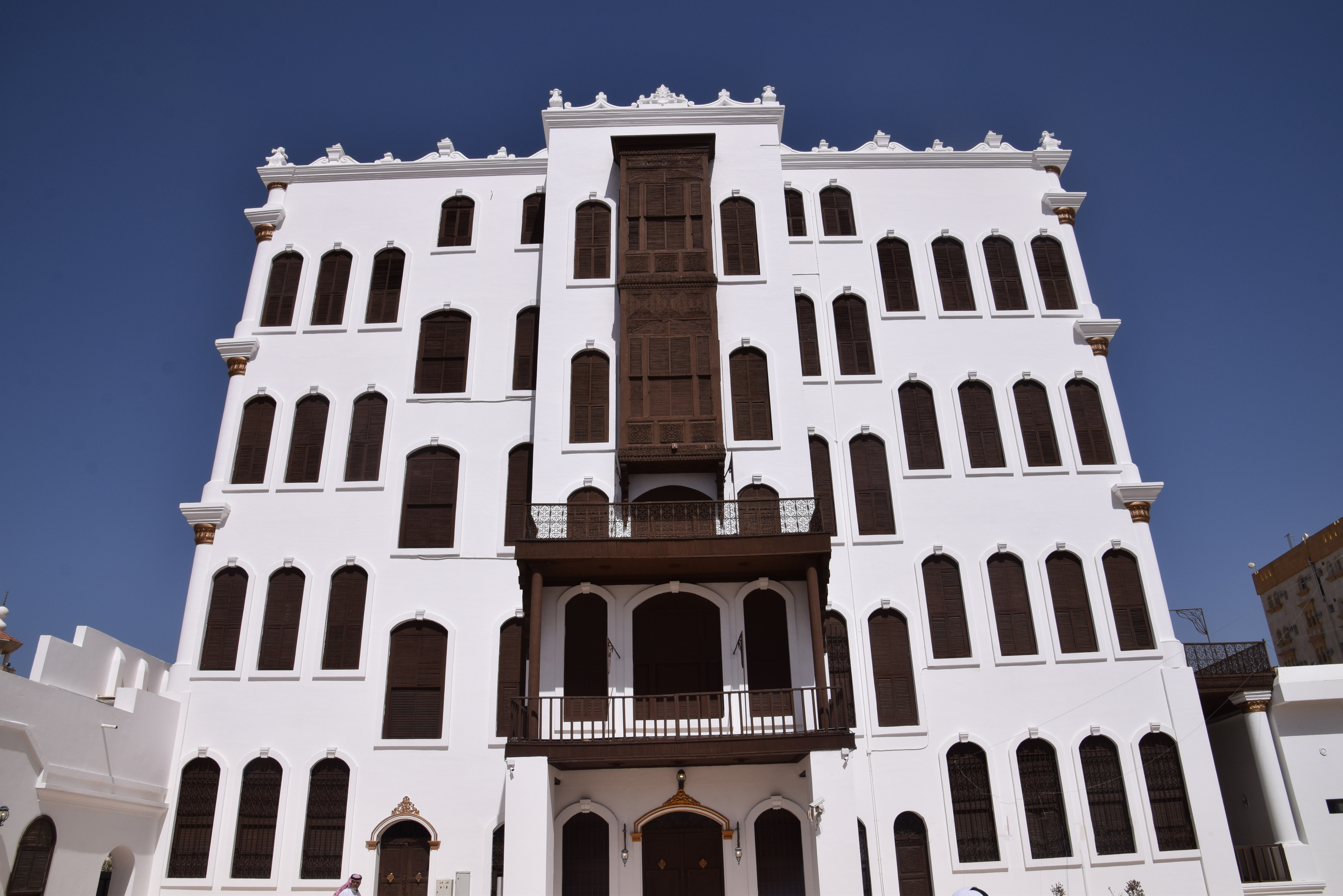
Shubra Palace

Shubra Palace or Shupra Castle is a royal palace in Taif, Saudi Arabia. The castle was created by Al-Shareef Ali Basha in 1905, and it was completed within two years (1907). After use as a royal palace, it was converted into a museum in 1995. King Abdul Aziz and King Faisal used to use the palace a residence when visiting Ta'if.

== History ==
The building was originally constructed in 1858 as a two-storey house. It was rebuilt by Ali Pasha, former sharif of Mecca, and completed in 1905. It was named after the Mohamed Ali Palace built in Shubra El Kheima, north of Cairo, Egypt. Following the capture of the city by Saudis the Shubra Palace was used by King Abdulaziz as summer residence. Two of his sons, Prince Talal and Prince Nawwaf, were born there. It is where King Abdulaziz died in 1953.

King Faisal used the Shubra Palace as a summer residence. The palace was also used as the office of Crown Prince Sultan. In 1995 the palace was made a heritage museum.

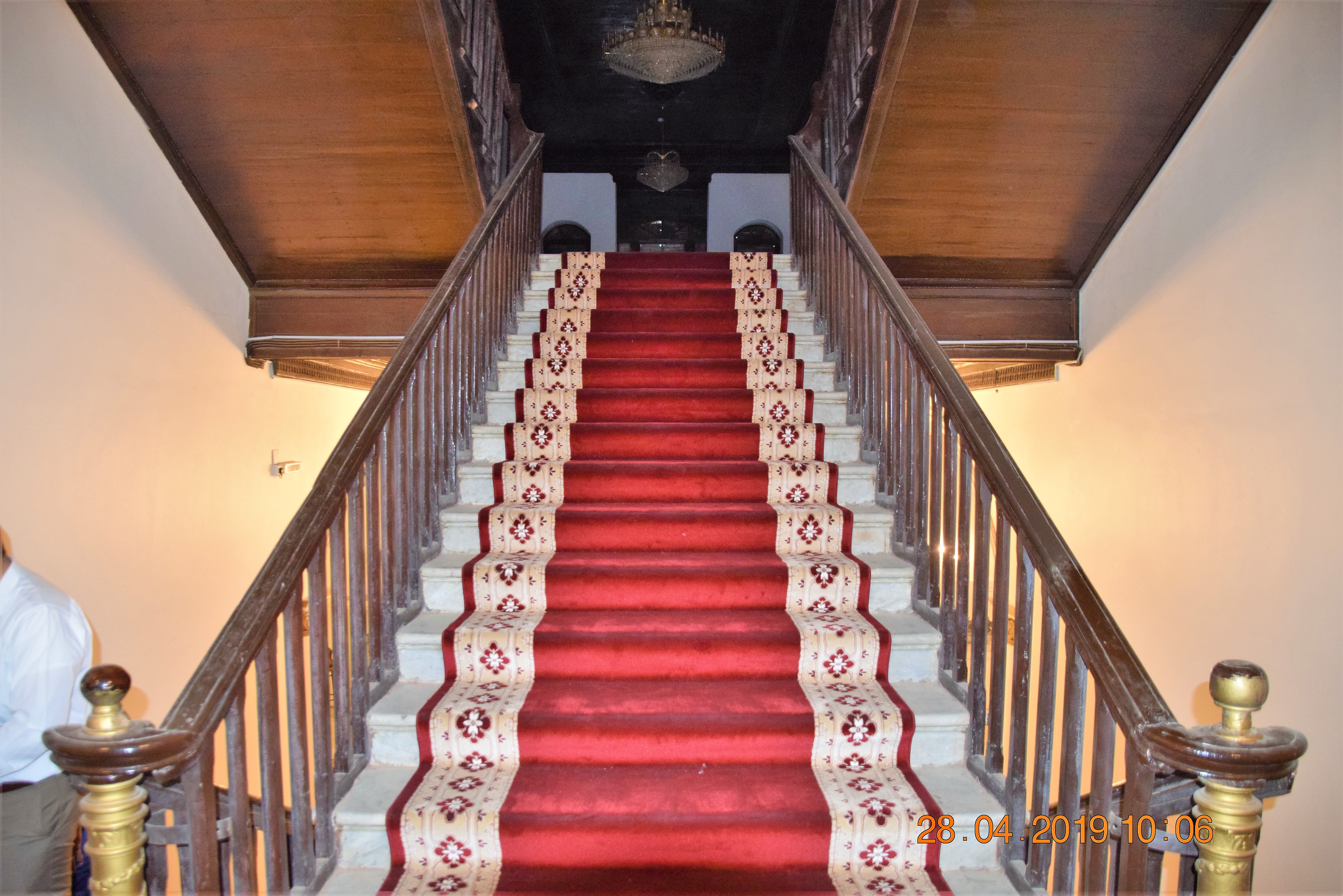
The Staircase

== Layout and style ==
The building consists of four floors and four uniform facades with gardens. The windows and balconies have a criss-crossed pattern of strips of wood, known as latticework. The interior of the building is designed with marble from Carrara, Italy. The castle consists of four floors, above the cellar, its include 150 rooms. Also, it has many entrances. The castle has four facades. In the main hall, there is a large wooden staircase, the gates of the castle and its windows made by carved wood with an artistic touch. The castle located in one of the largest streets in the city which called Shupra Street, and palace is one of the monuments in Taif.

== The museum ==
The museum is one of the most important museums in the Kingdom and shows the historical and political stages of the castle. The museum provides an overview of the establishment of the palace and the historical and political periods. Also, it contains a collection of stone works, pottery masterpieces, and inscriptions on both paintings and rocks. Besides, there is a section for crafts and industries such as extracting Taif-roses that yield oil and water. Another section is about the old market that is called (khan) locally. Regarding the museum, it exhibits various antiques and paintings on ancient rocks, hang on wooden shelves. Those antiques were discovered at Taif and its originals trace back into the Pre-Islamic and the Islamic eras. Some of those antiques are:

- Flagstones inscribed with Islamic calligraphy and its types throughout the ages.
- Different types and sizes of millstones used for grinding grains.
- Ancient weapons like swords, shields, daggers, spears, guns and rifles.
- Ancient precious jewels, jewelries and stamps.
- Ancient gold and silver coins and iron locks
- Household utensils and lamps which are made of stone, pottery and glass.
- An old distillation device for extracting rose water and oil, which is the most famous thing about Taif.
- Ancient agricultural tools and antiques carts for transporting stones and rocks that were used in the construction of the historical Al-Samalqi Dam (Arabic: سد السملقي), which was built at the time of the Umayyad Caliphate by Muawiyah bin Abi Sufyan.
