= Hafiz Wahba =

Egypt-born Saudi government official (1889–1967)

Personal details
- Born: 15 July 1889 Cairo, Khedivate of Egypt
- Died: 1967 (aged 77–78) Rome, Italy
- Education: Al Azhar University

Hafiz Wahba (Arabic: حافظ وهبة; 15 July 1889 – 1967) was a Saudi diplomat. Fuad Hamza and he were the first ambassadors of Saudi Arabia, the former in France and Hamza in the United Kingdom. In addition, they were among the advisers whom King Abdulaziz employed to improve the decision-making process of the state.

== Early life and education ==
Wahba was born in Cairo in 1889. He was a graduate of Al Azhar University. He also attended Muslim Jurisprudence College where he obtained a degree in Islamic law.

During the British occupation of Egypt, Wahba was sent to exile in Malta due to his alleged involvement in the 1919 revolt against British forces. Then he joined the pan-Islamic Khilafat movement in India. He worked as a school principal in Kuwait.

== Career ==
Wahba's first official task in Saudi Arabia was that of being a tutor to Prince Faisal bin Abdulaziz in 1916. He also taught Prince Saud, another son of Abdulaziz. In 1923 Wahba was appointed by Abdulaziz as his representative in Egypt. However, Wahba's attempts in Egypt failed. He was part of the Abdulaziz Al Saud's Hejaz campaign against Hussein bin Ali, King of Hejaz. When Mecca was captured in 1924 Abdulaziz sent him there together with his two other advisors, Abdullah Suleiman and Abdullah Al Damluji, before he himself entered the region. The same year Wahba was appointed civil governor of Mecca, a position that he held until 1926. At the same time he was part of the eight-member political committee at the Saudi royal court.

In 1928 Wahba was made the head of the education directorate which was responsible for educational activities in Hejaz. During his term the directorate sent fourteen Saudi students to Al Azhar in Cairo for higher education. The same year Wahba suggested King Abdulaziz establish a body to control and eliminate the violent attacks of the Ikhwan on pilgrims which had negative effects on the income of the country. This body laid the basis of the Committee for the Promotion of Commanding Right and Forbidding Wrong. Wahba accompanied King Abdulaziz in his meeting with Amir Faisal, King of Iraq, in February 1930.

Wahba was made Saudi envoy to Vatican City. He was assigned for the mission of ambassador of Saudi Arabia to the United Kingdom on 10 November 1930 and held the post until 1956. In 1955 King Saud asked Wahba to return to Riyadh when the relations between Saudi Arabia and Britain became very tense because of the Buraimi dispute. The reason for the end of his term was the diplomatic crisis between Saudi Arabia and Britain following the Suez Crisis.

On 7 November 1933 the Saudi-American Treaty was signed by Robert W. Bingham, the American ambassador to Great Britain, on behalf of the United States and Hafiz Wahba on behalf of Saudi Arabia. Wahba accompanied King Abdulaziz in his meeting with Franklin D. Roosevelt on 14 February 1945. The same year Wahba was part of the Saudi Arabia's delegation at the San Francisco meeting of the United Nations. He represented Saudi Arabia at the Palestine Conference held in London in October 1947. Wahba was named one of two representatives of the Saudi government as directors of the Arabian American Oil Company in May 1959. The other one was Abdullah Tariki. They were the first Saudi directors of the company.

Wahba served as the Saudi ambassador to the United Kingdom for a second term from 15 November 1962 to 13 July 1966. It was his last office, and he retired from public posts.

== Personal life and death ==
Wahba married several times, including a Kuwaiti woman. One of his children with his Kuwaiti wife was Mustafa Wahba who was the long-term secretary general of the Communist Party in Saudi Arabia (CPSA). Hafiz Wahba also had two daughters from this marriage and another son, Ali, from his other marriage.

Wahba settled in Rome following his retirement in 1966. He died there in 1967. He published various books, including Fifty Years in Arabia (1962) and Arabian Days (1964) both of which were published in London.
