= Jordanian National Liberation Movement =

Jordanian political movement

Jordanian National Liberation Movement was a clandestine Jordanian political movement, connected to the Democratic Front for the Liberation of Palestine. The group considered the Jordanian government as fascist. In its own description it demanded the removal of the Wasfi Tal cabinet and liberation of Jordan from American and British colonial influence.

The group began armed operations on September 11, 1971. Some of its actions included:

- September 11, 1971: Bomb placed outside security police building in Abdali (Amman). Two policemen wounded.
- September 12, 1971: The 'Abu Ahmeed' Restaurant, frequently visited by higher officers, bombed.
- September 13, 1971: Land mine explodes outside military base in Irbid.
- September 19, 1971: Jordanian tank destroyed by land mine in Jabel, northern Jordan
- November 9, 1971: Two grenades launched at a Land Rover belonging to the Jordanian Army at Irbid. Soldiers damaged.
- December 13, 1971: Fire-bomb launched at the Jordanian legation in Geneva. Two policemen and one firefighter badly injured.

== See also ==
- List of political parties in Jordan
- Jordanian Revolutionary People's Party

== Sources ==
- Al-Djabha-Fronten 1/1972, p. 14-16.
