= Nawwaf bin Abdulaziz Al Saud =

Saudi royal, businessman, and government official (1932–2015)

Director General of Intelligence Agency
- In office: 1 September 2001 – 26 January 2005
- Predecessor: Turki bin Faisal
- Successor: Muqrin bin Abdulaziz
- Monarch: Fahd
- Born: 16 August 1932; Taif, Kingdom of Hejaz and Nejd
- Died: 29 September 2015 (aged 83); Riyadh, Saudi Arabia
- Spouse: Jawahir Al Sheikh
Names
- Nawwaf bin Abdulaziz bin Abdulrahman
- Dynasty: Al Saud
- Father: King Abdulaziz
- Mother: Munaiyir

Nawwaf bin Abdulaziz Al Saud (Arabic: نواف بن عبد العزيز آل سعود, Nawwāf bin 'Abd al 'Azīz Āl Su'ūd; 16 August 1932 – 29 September 2015) was a Saudi Arabian businessman and politician. A member of the House of Saud, he became a close ally of King Abdullah. In different periods Prince Nawwaf held significant government posts, including the director of Saudi intelligence agency.

== Early life and education ==
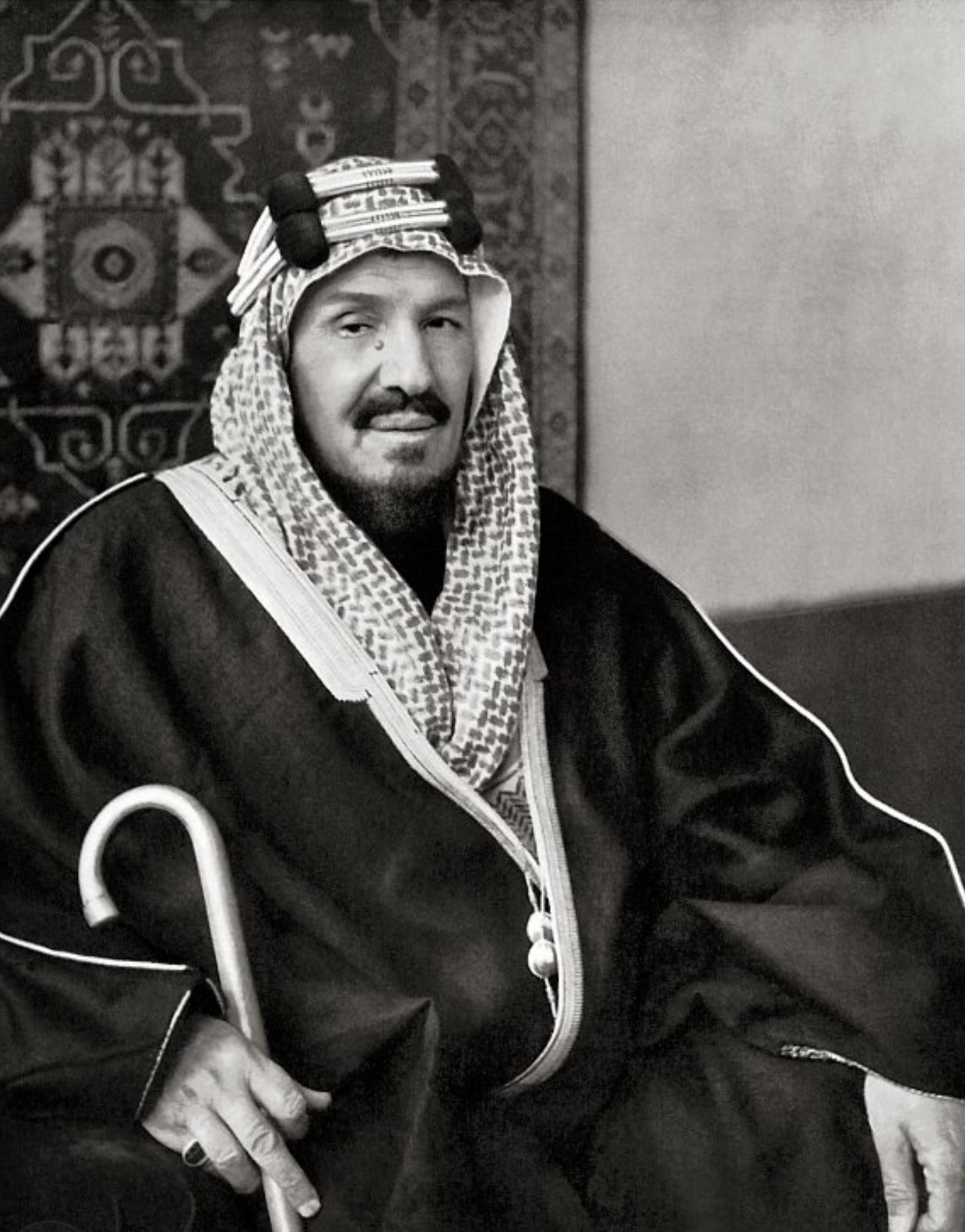
King Abdulaziz, father of Nawwaf

Prince Nawwaf was born in Shubra Palace, Taif, on 16 August 1932. He was the twenty-second son of King Abdulaziz.

He was a full brother of Prince Talal. Their full sister was Princess Madawi who died in November 2017. Their mother was an Armenian, Munaiyir, whose family escaped from the Ottoman Empire between 1915 and 1923, a period of turmoil in Armenia. Munaiyir was presented to King Abdulaziz when she was 12 years old in the palace of emir of Unayzah in 1921, she converted to Islam. Their first child, Talal, was born in 1924. Following tradition, Munaiyir became known as Umm Talal, "mother of Talal". However, in 1927, the three-year-old Talal died.

It is reported by her family that Munaiyir remained illiterate all her life. Munaiyir was regarded by British diplomats in Saudi Arabia as one of King Abdulaziz's favourite wives. She was as known for her intelligence as for her beauty. Munaiyir died in December 1991.

During the reign of King Saud, his relations with his full-brother Prince Talal became negative, even leading to contesting their inheritances.

== Education ==
Nawwaf bin Abdulaziz received his primary Arabic and Islamic education at a special school for royal family members. There he studied geography, history, geometry and religion. He also completed undergraduate education in Islamic civilization in Saudi Arabia and his higher education in the United States.

== Career ==
Nawwaf bin Abdulaziz was the commander of the royal guard from 1952 to 1956. In May 1961 Prince Nawwaf did not accept the proposal of King Saud to name him as minister of interior. Then, he served briefly as chief of the royal court in 1961, and he resigned from the office in July 1961. Prince Nawaf was appointed minister of finance by the king, and served in the post from September 1961 to March 1962. He succeeded Prince Talal in the post.

On 1 February 1968, following the evacuation of the British forces from the Persian Gulf region, King Faisal named him as one of his special advisors for Persian Gulf affairs which he held until 1975. In view of his experience in various spheres, King Faisal sent him to participate in official delegations of the Kingdom at various meetings, including Arab and Islamic summits and meetings of non-aligned countries. He also led the Kingdom's delegations on behalf of King Faisal or work as his special envoy. Prince Nawwaf was thoroughly familiar with international policy and law, and was also an expert on the Middle East affairs. He did his best to unify the ranks of the Arab emirates and to integrate these emirates into one state following their partitions into seven tiny states during the colonial rule. In view of his rich experience in economic and political spheres, Prince Nawwaf was delegated to serve as the Saudi Government's official spokesman and its special envoy on several occasions. He visited the four corners of the world and positively contributed to the settlement of numerous disputes in Africa and the Middle East as well as in other parts of the world. He also accompanied Crown Prince Abdullah during his official foreign trips. However, Prince Nawwaf did not hold any official position from 1975 to 2001.

Prince Nawwaf was appointed director general of Saudi intelligence agency Al Mukhabarat Al A'amah following Prince Turki's resignation on 1 September 2001. His appointment did not result in significant power change in the royal family, since King Fahd's son, Saud bin Fahd, continued to serve as deputy director which he had been serving since 1985. However, through this move Crown Prince Abdullah attempted to reduce the power of Interior Minister Prince Nayef who had been the chair of a commission consisting of the heads of the organizations, including Al Mukhabarat Al A'amah. Given that Prince Nawwaf was older than Prince Nayef the latter's power through this commission was at least challenged due to seniority of the former.

Prince Nawwaf's tenure ended on 26 January 2005 when he resigned due to health concerns. Immediately after the acceptance of his resignation, King Fahd appointed him as his special advisor. Prince Muqrin replaced Prince Nawwaf as the director general of Saudi intelligence agency in October 2005, nine months after his resignation. He was a special advisor to the King Abdullah at the rank of minister, and his term was extended for four years in 2009. Prince Nawwaf also served as a special advisor to King Salman.

== Other activities ==
Prince Nawwaf was one of the supporters of the Free Princes Movement led by his brother Prince Talal in the early 1960s. At the beginning of King Faisal's reign in 1964 Prince Nawwaf became a member of the council which had been established by the king to guide the succession issues.

He contributed to the establishment of some industrial projects inside and outside the Kingdom to serve the Arab economy. His contribution to the strengthening of the Kingdom's relations with other world states is widely respected. He was one of the founders and a major shareholder of the Saudi-New Zealand Bank. He also owned some investment projects in the fields of real estate, energy and tourism. He was one of the pioneers of the solar energy industry. Realizing the importance of solar energy, he extended his support to Sydney University in Australia to enable it to conduct research and studies in this field.

== Views ==
A Saudi survey conducted shortly after the 11 September attacks concluded that 95 percent of educated Saudi men aged between 25 and 41 supported Osama bin Laden's cause. Nawwaf bin Abdulaziz argued that this support was motivated by Saudi anger over U.S. support for Israel. After the US sanctions against Iran in 2000, Prince Nawwaf said "Iran is being treated unfairly by some countries, and this is not in the interests of the Arabia Gulf or even the US."

== Personal life ==
Prince Nawwaf was married to Jawahir Al Sheikh, together they had three children: Abdulaziz (born 1979), Faisal (born 1984) and Sarah (born 1989). In 2008, his daughter Princess Sarah was a student at Franklin College in Lugano, Switzerland, pursuing a degree in international communications. Mohammed bin Nawwaf was his eldest son who served as Saudi ambassador to the United Kingdom and Ireland between 2005 and 2018.

== Illness and death ==
In March 2002, Prince Nawwaf was admitted to the American University hospital in Beirut after suddenly suffering a stroke. He was there for the Arab League summit meeting. He was reported to have suffered a brain haemorrhage. Then he underwent a surgery in 2002. He used a wheelchair following his health problems.

Prince Nawwaf died on 29 September 2015 at the age of 83. The funeral took place at Grand Mosque in Mecca on 30 September.

== Honours ==
=== Foreign honours ===
- Honorary Grand Commander of the Order of the Defender of the Realm (S.M.N.) (1970).
- Knight Grand Cross of the Order of Civil Merit (15 February 1974).

Political offices
Preceded by Turki bin Faisal	Al Mukhabarat Al A'amah; 2001–2005	Succeeded by Muqrin bin Abdulaziz
