= Abdullah bin Suleiman Al Hamdan =

Saudi Arabian politician and businessman (1887–1965)

- عبد الله بن سليمان الحمدان

Finance Minister
- In office 1932 – September 1955
- Prime Minister: King Abdulaziz; King Saud
- Preceded by: Office established
- Succeeded by: Mohammed Suroor Sabban

Personal details
- Born: 1887 Unaizah
- Died: 1965 (aged 77–78)
- Nickname: Wazīr Kullī Shaīʾ (minister for everything)

Abdullah bin Suleiman Al Hamdan (Arabic: عبد الله بن سليمان الحمدان, 1887–1965), commonly known as Abdullah Suleiman and also by his nickname Wazīr Kullī Shaīʾ (the minister of everything), was the treasurer and long-term as well as first finance minister of Saudi Arabia (1932–1955). He was named "the minister of everything" due to his involvement in nearly all state affairs which included agriculture, transportation and mining resources among the others. During the reign of King Abdulaziz he was the most significant non-royal official.

== Early life ==
Abdullah Suleiman was born in 1887 in Unaizah, Qassim province, Arabia. He received no formal education. His family had business activities in Unaizah.

Abdullah Suleiman lived in India, Bahrain and other Gulf States before returning to his native country. In India he stayed at home of Sheikh Abdullah Al Fawzan who was a Najdi merchant settled in Bombay and a representative of King Abdulaziz there. Abdullah Suleiman established his own firm in Bahrain.

== Career ==
His brother was working at diwan of Abdulaziz as a minor finance clerk, and Abdullah Suleiman replaced him who left the diwan due to his illness. From 1921 he began to work for Abdulaziz and was first assigned by Abdulaziz to manage his budget. Later Abdullah Suleiman became his personal advisor. Following the capture of Mecca in 1924 he was sent by Abdulaziz there together with Hafiz Wahba and Abdullah Al Damluji, the other advisors of the monarch, to make observations in the city before his arrival. After the completion of the annexation of Hijaz Abdullah Suleiman settled there to combine the Hijazi finance and Abdulaziz's court treasury. In addition, he was responsible for the management of the revenues collected from customs and post offices in the region. He was also responsible for collecting the taxes on pilgrims.

Abdullah Suleiman began to deal with financial management of the country in 1928 when the related body was named agency of finance. Following the establishment of the ministry of finance in 1932 he became the head of the organization. More specifically, in December 1931 the constitution of the council of deputies was declared, and Abdullah Suleiman became one of four council members as the deputy for finance.

The oil agreement with the Standard Oil Company of California was signed by Abdullah Suleiman on behalf of Saudi Arabia and Lloyd N. Hamilton on behalf of the company in Khuzam Palace, Jeddah, on 29 May 1933. Suleiman remained responsible for the relations with the company which was later renamed as ARAMCO. He accompanied King Abdulaziz in his meeting with Franklin D. Roosevelt on 14 February 1945. Abdullah Suleiman prepared the first budget of Saudi Arabia in 1947 which was rejected by King Abdulaziz because of the inclusion of serious cuts in spending.

Over time Abdullah Suleiman gained more power and appointed his brother and his son to the posts of the vice and deputy finance minister, respectively. He continued to head the ministry of finance following the death of King Abdulaziz in 1953. In addition, King Saud, the successor of King Abdulaziz, made Abdullah Suleiman the head of the State Economic Council. During this period he met with Hjalmar Schacht who was a consultant of Aristotle Socrates Onassis and was Adolf Hitler's finance expert to negotiate the terms of an agreement to establish a state owned Saudi Arabian maritime tanker company. The agreement was signed by King Saud and Onassis in January 1954.

Suleiman asked to be relieved from the office due to his health problems in September 1954, and his resignation was accepted by King Saud next year in September. However, there are many reports citing various reasons for his resignation. For instance, his involvement in the Onassis tanker agreement and his active role in the relations with Aramco are given as reasons. Suleiman was replaced by Mohammed Suroor Sabban in the post.

== Business activities ==
Abdullah Suleiman started his career as a businessman establishing a company in Bahrain long before his political career. He worked for Marconi company which was the importer of Ford cars in Saudi Arabia in the 1920s. He was also one of the shareholders of the Arabian maritime tanker company which was established in 1954. The other shareholders were Aristotle Onassis and merchants from Jeddah.

Following his retirement from government Abdullah Suleiman focused on business activities owning hotels and trading companies. He was the owner of Basaten Hotel in Jeddah which had been established in the 1950s. He was also the sole importer of Dodge cars and trucks in Saudi Arabia. He founded a cement company with Ahmed Jamjum in Jeddah, Arabian Cement Company, which started cement production in 1958. The company was praised by Aramco's Arabic magazine entitled Qafilat al Zayt as being the start of Arab industry.

== Death and legacy ==
Abdullah Suleiman died in 1965.

Al-Wazir Street (now King Faisal Road) in southern Riyadh was named after him. J.E. Peterson published a book entitled Saudi Arabia Under Ibn Saud: Economic and Financial Foundations of the State in 2018 focusing on the role of Abdullah Suleiman as minister of finance during the reign of King Abdulaziz.

Political offices
Preceded by Office established	Minister of Finance; 1932–1955	Succeeded by Mohammed Suroor Sabban
