= Mohammed Suroor Sabban =

Mohammed Suroor Sabban (Arabic: محمد سرور الصبان;1898–1972) was a politician, economist, publisher, and poet from Qunfodah, Saudi Arabia.

== Biography ==
Mohammed was born in Qunfodah and raised in Mecca. His family originated from North Africa who were taken to Saudi Arabia as slaves. His father was a slave of the Sabban family of Mecca who was freed later. Sabban family raised and educated Mohammed.

He was a member of the Hejazi National Party which stripped the Hashemites crown from Hejaz in 1925. He was the owner and publisher of a significant newspaper in Hejaz, Sout Al Hejaz. He established many civil institutes in Mecca in early times, such as the ambulance cultural society, and Al-Qirsh Society. He also participated in forming Al Wahda sport club of Mecca.

Mohammed was an aide of Abdullah Suleiman, minister of finance. He replaced him in the post on 20 November 1954. In addition, Mohammed was made the minister of state and a royal advisor. His tenure ended in February 1958.

Later he served as the head of the Islamic Conference. He is known as the 'father' of the modern Saudi economy. He embraced the liberal economic values in Saudi Arabia following the work of the Egyptian economic leader Talaat Pasha Harb. He called for collective trade instead of traditional individualistic or family-based trade. He established dozens of trade, industrial, and financial companies in Mecca and Saudi Arabia.

He established the "Hejazi Library", which was among the first civic publisher houses in Hejaz and the Arabian peninsula. It published Mohammed Hasan Awwad's famous book on reform: 'Khawater Mosarraha' in 1925. Also wrote and published the first modern book in Hejaz: Adab Al Hejaz. Sabban harbored the modernism movement; he published another famous book supporting the modern young Hejazi poets in Al-Ma'aradd, which is a collection of work by the young modern Hejazis.
