= Abdullah Al Damluji =

Iraqi minister of foreign affairs and physician (1890–1970)

Foreign Minister of Iraq
- In office February 1942 – June 1942
- In office 1934–1934
- Prime Minister: Jamil Al Midfai
- In office 1930 – October 1931
- Prime Minister: Nuri Pasha Said
- Preceded by: Office established

Foreign Minister of Najd and Hejaz
- In office 1926–1928
- Preceded by: Office established

Personal details
- Born: Abdullah Said Damluji; 1890 Mosul, Ottoman Empire
- Died: 1970 (aged 79–80)
- Education: Military College of Medicine; Haidar Pasha Medical College

Abdullah Al Damluji (Arabic: عبد الله الدملوجي; 1890–1970), also known as Abdullah Beg Al Damluji, was an Iraqi physician who served as one of Ibn Saud's advisers. He held several government positions, including the minister of foreign affairs of Najd and Hejaz and of Iraq.

== Early life and education ==
Damluji was born in Mosul, Iraq, in 1890. He was a graduate of the Military College of Medicine and Haidar Pasha Medical College, both in Constantinople. He had a good command of French.

== Career and activities ==
Damluji was one of the physicians who served in the Ottoman army during the Balkan War in the period 1912–1913. He was part of an Arab nationalist Ottoman military club led by Aziz Al Misri in Constantinople. Members of the club including Damluji had to leave the city because of their nationalist affairs and settled in Cairo in Spring 1914. After a while Damluji went to Basra and then to Riyadh where he joined the entourage of Ibn Saud as a physician in 1915. He was made a member of the royal court accompanying the foreign visitors and also, joined the Saudi delegations to foreign visits. In one of such visits Damluji accompanied Ahmed Al Thunayan, Saudi foreign affairs advisor, in Baghdad in February 1920. Damluji along with Hafiz Wahba also acted as a tutor to Prince Saud, son of Ibn Saud. As of 1922 Damluji was serving as the representative of Ibn Saud, Sultan of Najd and replaced Ahmed Al Thunayan as his chief foreign affairs advisor.

In 1924 Damluji was sent to Mecca together with Hafiz Wahba and Abdullah Suleiman following the capture of the city to monitor the social, cultural, political and economic conditions. In 1926 he became Ibn Saud's personal representative in Hejaz. In the same year Damluji was appointed the deputy minister of foreign affairs which he held until 1928 when he was replaced by Fuad Hamza in the post. In fact, Damluji was the foreign minister of Najd and Hejaz.

Damluji represented the Court of Nejd, the Hejaz and its dependencies at the Medina Railway Conference held in Haifa in August 1928. The conference was a failure which led to a border crisis between Saudi and Iraqi authorities. Due to this incident he resigned from office and did not returned to Arabia. He first went to Syria and then to Lebanon. He eventually returned to his native Iraq in September 1928 where he became the consul-general of Iraq in Cairo. He was appointed minister of foreign affairs of Iraq in the cabinet led by Nuri Pasha Said in 1930. Damluji's tenure ended in October 1932 when Nuri Pasha Said resigned from the post. Immediately after this incident Damluji was named as the ambassador of Iraq to Turkey.

Damluji was elected as the deputy for Mosul and was appointed director general of public health in 1932. He was made the chief chamberlain to the King in 1933 and was again appointed minister of foreign affairs in February 1934 which he held for one year. The cabinet was led by Prime Minister Jamil Al Midfai. From 1934 to 1936 Damluji was director general of public health.

Damluji was named as the Iraqi minister of foreign affairs for a third time in February 1942, but his term lasted only until June 1942 when he resigned from office.

== Death ==
Damluji died in 1970.
