= Arab Socialist Action Party – Arabian Peninsula =

Arab Socialist Action Party – Arabian Peninsula حزب العمل الاشتراكي العربي ـ الجزيرة العربية
- Founded: 1972
- Dissolved: 1990
- Newspaper: al-Masira
- Ideology: Marxism; Arab nationalism
- International affiliation: Arab Socialist Action Party

The Arab Socialist Action Party – Arabian Peninsula (Arabic: حزب العمل الاشتراكي العربي ـ الجزيرة العربية Ḥizb al`Amal al Ishtirākiy al-`Arabiy-Al-Jazīra al`Arabiyyah), was an underground oppositional political party in Saudi Arabia. It was founded in 1972 by elements of the erstwhile Arab Nationalist Movement.

== Profile of the party ==
The party was able to attract a following amongst intellectuals and middle class elements, and became a prominent force of the secular opposition. Ideologically it adhered to Marxism and Arab nationalism. It considered armed struggle as the only option to overthrow the ruling system of Saudi Arabia. The membership was predominantly Shi'ite.

The party was able to attract former members from the People's Democratic Party, which ceased to function in the mid-1970s.

The party raised three main demands, introduction of political liberties, nationalization of oil resources, and the end to foreign military presence in Saudi Arabia. It also opposed discrimination against Shi'ites.

== Press ==
The party published al-Masira as its central organ. It was printed inside Saudi Arabia clandestinely on an irregular basis. Moreover, until the 1982 crackdown, the cadres of the party were well represented amongst the staff of the legal newspaper al-Yaum (اليوم).

== Relations with PFLP ==
The party was a section of the Arab Socialist Action Party, a Pan-Arab party led by the PFLP general secretary Dr George Habash. But unlike other sections of the Arab Socialist Action Party, the linkage to PFLP was weaker due to the lack of a strong PFLP presence in Saudi Arabia. By 1975, the linkage between the Saudi party and PFLP began to decline and in 1978 the Saudi party broke its affiliation with PFLP. Instead the party began orientating itself towards cooperation with other groups in the region. In 1981, the party established relations with the Communist Party in Saudi Arabia and the Popular Front for the Liberation of Bahrain in exile.

== Mecca Siege of 1979 ==
Five days after Islamic insurgents had seized the Grand Mosque in Mecca on 20 November 1979, the party issued a statement in Beirut, clarifying the demands of the insurgents. The party, however, denied any involvement in the act.

== 1982 crackdown ==
In April 1982 the party was dealt a severe blow, as Saudi state forces arrested hundreds of its members. Many of the arrested were journalists connected to the al-Yaum newspaper. In the end of 1982 an amnesty was declared for the arrested. However, several of the released had problems returning to government services or were denied travel abroad. Al-Yaum was closed down. Following the 1982 crackdown, the party critically reviewed its past performance. In January 1984 a provisional leadership was reconstituted.

By 1987 there were reports that the party had begun to reconstruct its organizational structure.

== Amnesty and dismantling ==
In the 1990s, the party agreed with the government to disband, in exchange for amnesty of political prisoners. Five jailed party members were pardoned in April 1990. A group of militants of the party were pardoned on Eid-ul-Adha 1991.

== See also ==
- List of political parties in Saudi Arabia
