= Born a King =

2019 drama film

- English poster
- Arabic: وُلِدَ مَلِكاً
- Directed by: Agustí Villaronga
- Written by: Henry Fitzherbert
- Produced by: Andrés Vicente Gómez; Marco Gómez; Stuart Sutherland; Todd Albert Nims
- Starring: Ed Skrein; Hermione Corfield; Abdullah Ali; Laurence Fox
- Cinematography: Josep M. Civit
- Music by: Hesham Nazih
- Production companies: Celtic Films; Arena Audiovisual
- Distributed by: Vox Film Distribution
- Release dates: 25 April 2019 (BCN Film Fest); 26 September 2019 (Middle East)
- Countries: United Kingdom; Saudi Arabia; Bahrain; UAE; Oman; Kuwait
- Languages: English; Arabic
- Budget: $21 million

Born a King (Arabic: وُلِدَ مَلِكاً, romanized: Wulida Malikᵃⁿ) is a 2019 historical coming-of-age drama film directed by Agustí Villaronga. The film stars Abdullah Ali, Ed Skrein, Hermione Corfield, Laurence Fox, and James Fleet.

== Plot ==
In 1919, following the collapse of the Ottoman Empire, 14-year-old Faisal is sent by his father, Emir Abdulaziz, on a high-stakes diplomatic mission to London to secure the formation of what was to become the Kingdom of Saudi Arabia. Young Faisal negotiates his country's and his family's future with seasoned politicians like Winston Churchill and Lord Curzon, and forms a friendship with Princess Mary.

== Cast ==
- Abdullah Ali as Prince Faisal
  - Yousef Alsaid as baby Faisal
- Ed Skrein as Philby
- Hermione Corfield as Princess Mary
- Laurence Fox as Lawrence of Arabia
- Rawkan Binbella as Emir Abdulaziz
- James Fleet as King George V
- Celyn Jones as Winston Churchill
- Rubén Ochandiano as Ahmed bin Abdullah Al Thunayan
- Aidan McArdle as Humphrey Bowman
- Marina Gatell as Stella
- Kenneth Cranham as Lord Curzon
- Lewis Reeves as Prince of Wales

== Production ==
It wrapped filming in late 2017. The production of the movie lasted nearly for four years. Filming locations include London, Riyadh and Diriyah. The film is Saudi actor Abdullah Ali's cinematic debut.

== Release ==
It premiered at the Barcelona Sant Jordi International Film Festival (BCN FILM FEST) on 25 April 2019. On 26 September 2019 the movie was released in the United Arab Emirates, Oman, Kuwait, Bahrain and Saudi Arabia and earned a first-four-day $972,962.

== Reception ==
Born a King is the recipient of the 2019 best film award from the Inward Eye Film Festival for independent cinema.
