= Arab Socialist Action Party =

Arab Socialist Action Party حزب العمل الاشتراكي العربي
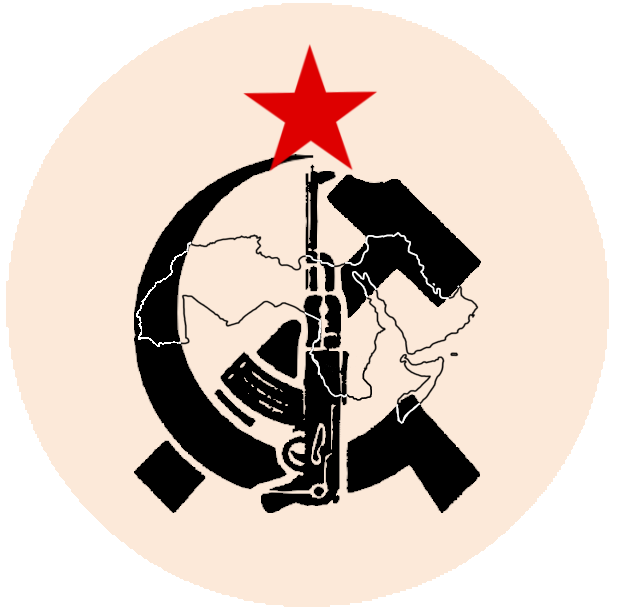
- Secretary-General: George Habash
- Preceded by: Arab Nationalist Movement
- Newspaper: Tariq at-Thawra
- Ideology: Marxism; Anti-Zionism; Pan-Arabism
- Political position: Left-wing

The Arab Socialist Action Party (Arabic: حزب العمل الاشتراكي العربي) was a Pan-Arab political party, formed by the right-wing faction of the Arab Nationalist Movement after the latter's disintegration. The general secretary of the party was Dr. George Habash and the organ of the party was Tariq at-Thawra.

Sections of the party included:

- Iraq: Arab Socialist Action Party – Iraq
- Jordan: Jordanian Revolutionary People's Party
- Lebanon: Arab Socialist Action Party – Lebanon
- Palestine: Popular Front for the Liberation of Palestine
- Saudi Arabia: Arab Socialist Action Party – Arabian Peninsula
