= Mekteb-i Aşiret-i Hümayun =

Tribal school in the Ottoman Empire

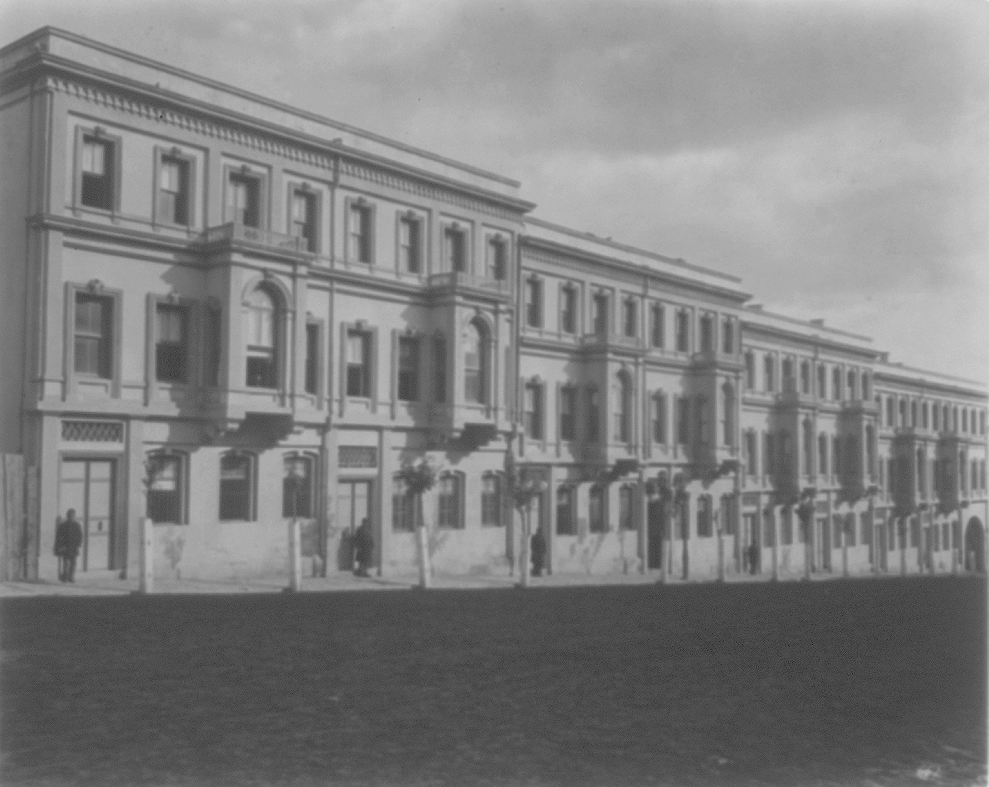
Picture of the Imperial Tribal School (Ottoman Turkish: مَكْتَبِ عشیرت همايون) from 1892 or 1893

Mekteb-i Aşiret-i Hümayun (Ottoman Turkish: مَكْتَبِ عشیرت همايون, Imperial Tribal School) or Aşiret Mektebi (Arabic: عشيرة مكتبي) was an Istanbul school founded in 1892 by Abdulhamid II to promote the integration of tribes into the Ottoman Empire through education. Abdulhamid's main assistant in this endeavor was Abdullah bin Abdullah Al Saud, known as Abdullah Pasha Al Saud.

The curriculum was heavily biased towards the teaching of religion, and it also had a strong emphasis on students learning the Ottoman Turkish language.

After graduation, students were expected to continue education at Mekteb-i Sultani (Imperial High School) and then at Mekteb-i Mülkiye (School of Civil Administration), in order to be able to serve the empire in their native region.

Initially only the sons of the Arab sheikhs and notables were permitted to enroll, however after petitioning by Albanian notables, in 1902 an imperial decree resulted in the enrollment of twenty students from the Albanian cities of Debar, Elbasan, and Yanya. Later Kurds were permitted to enroll also.

The school was closed in 1907.
