= Juan Pablo Pérez Alfonzo =

Venezuelan politician (1903–1979)

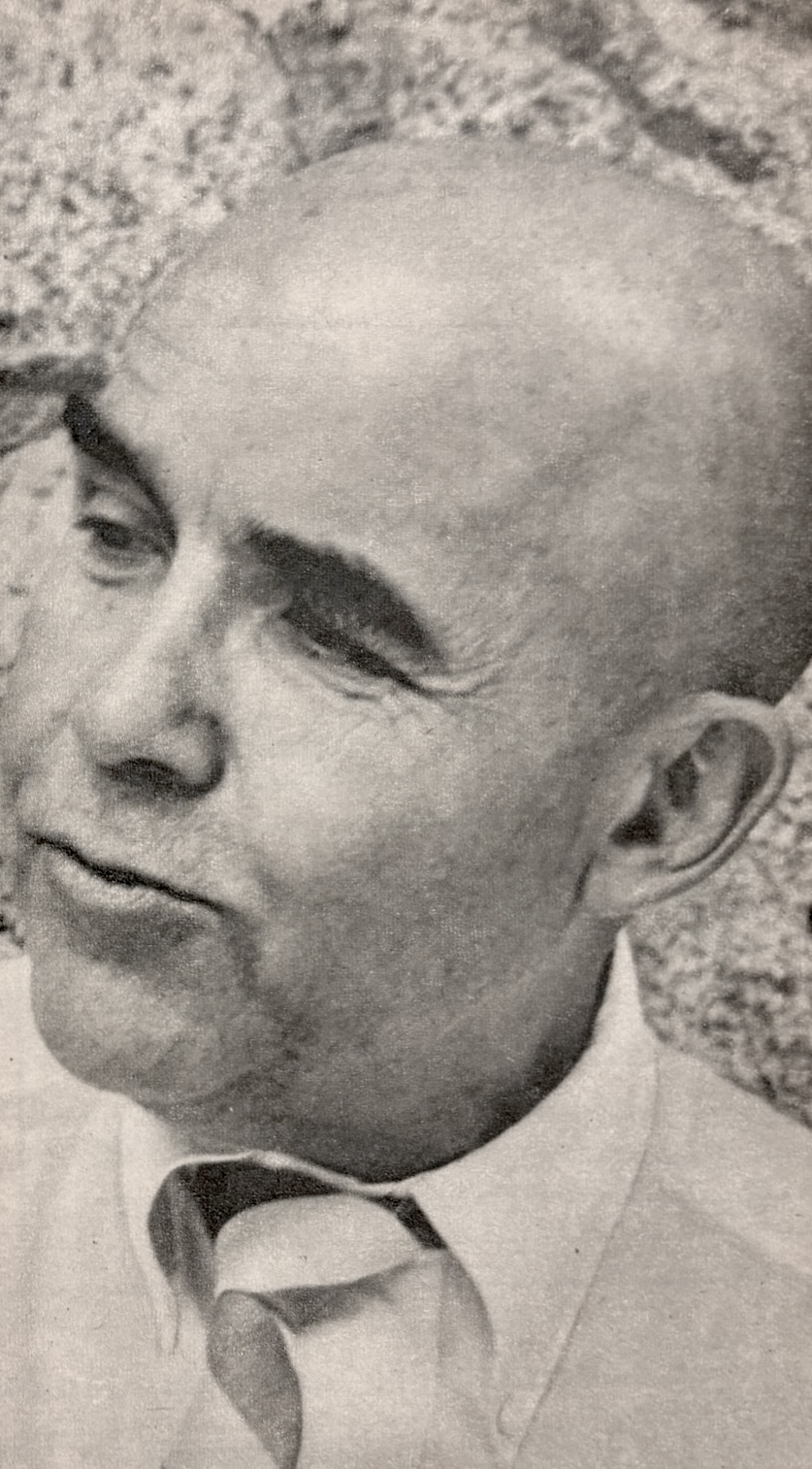

Minister of Development of Venezuela
- In office 15 November 1945 – 9 April 1948
- President: Rómulo Betancourt; Rómulo Gallegos

Minister of Mines and Hydrocarbons of Venezuela
- In office 13 February 1959 – 23 January 1963
- President: Rómulo Betancourt
- Succeeded by: Arturo Hernández Grisanti

Personal details
- Born: 13 December 1903 Caracas, Venezuela
- Died: 3 September 1979 (aged 75) Washington D.C., USA
- Spouse: Alicia Castillo
- Profession: diplomat, politician, lawyer

Juan Pablo Pérez Alfonzo (Note: Though often misspelled Alfonso, the correct name is Alfonzo, as confirmed by the airport photo and other official sources and the majority of reliable references.) (13 December 1903 – 3 September 1979) was a prominent Venezuelan diplomat, politician and lawyer primarily responsible for the inception and creation of the OPEC, along with Saudi Arabian minister Abdullah Tariki.

== Early life and education ==
Born in Caracas, Venezuela, Pérez Alfonzo was initially a medical student at Johns Hopkins University before pursuing a PhD in political and social sciences at the Central University of Venezuela.

== Political career ==
=== Gallegos administration and subsequent exile ===
Pérez Alfonzo helped found the political party Democratic Action (AD; Acción Democrática). As Minister of Development during the first democratic government of Venezuela, the short-lived administration of Rómulo Gallegos (1947–1948), he was responsible for increasing oil revenues for the country by raising taxes through what later became known worldwide as the 50/50 formula. Initially, the Seven Sisters (the dominant Anglo-American oil companies), responded to the 50/50 law by threatening to ramp up production elsewhere while slowing down production in Venezuela. Perez Alfonso subsequently encouraged other governments to adopt the 50/50 formula, which they ultimately did. The 50/50 formula was the global norm until 1970.

With the overthrow of the democratically elected government of President Rómulo Gallegos by the military in November 1948, Perez Alfonzo obtained political asylum in the United States after spending 9 months in jail. He moved to Mexico for financial reasons, where he resided until the return of democracy in 1958 when the democratically elected President Rómulo Betancourt called him back to government service to finish the job he had begun under the presidency of Gallegos, this time as Minister of Energy. During the years he spent in Washington he studied the activities of the oil industry worldwide and, in particular, the Texas Railroad Commission (TRC), which served to reinforce his ideas about creating OPEC, further developing his thoughts about the conservation and stabilization of petroleum production and the defense of oil prices.

=== Betancourt administration and OPEC creation ===
As Minister of Mines and Hydrocarbons during the second democratic government of Venezuela of President Rómulo Betancourt (1959–1964), he was responsible for the creation of the OPEC (Organization of Petroleum Exporting Countries) for the purpose of rationalizing and thereby increasing oil prices in the world market. Triggered by a 1960 law instituted by US President Dwight Eisenhower that forced quotas for Venezuelan oil and favored Canada and Mexico's oil industries, Perez Alfonzo (also known as the Father of OPEC) reacted by seeking an alliance with oil-producing Arab nations to protect the continuous autonomy and profitability of Venezuela's oil (among other reasons), establishing a strong link between the South American nation and the Middle East region that survives to this day. His extensive notes of the TRC methods for regulation of production to maximize recovery served him well both in Venezuela and later when he took them translated into Arabic to the Cairo meeting that served as a launching platform for the OPEC, where Wanda Jablonski introduced him to then minister of petroleum of Saudi Arabia, Abdullah Tariki, co-founder of the OPEC.

== Personal life ==
He was an ascetic vegetarian.

== Legacy and death ==
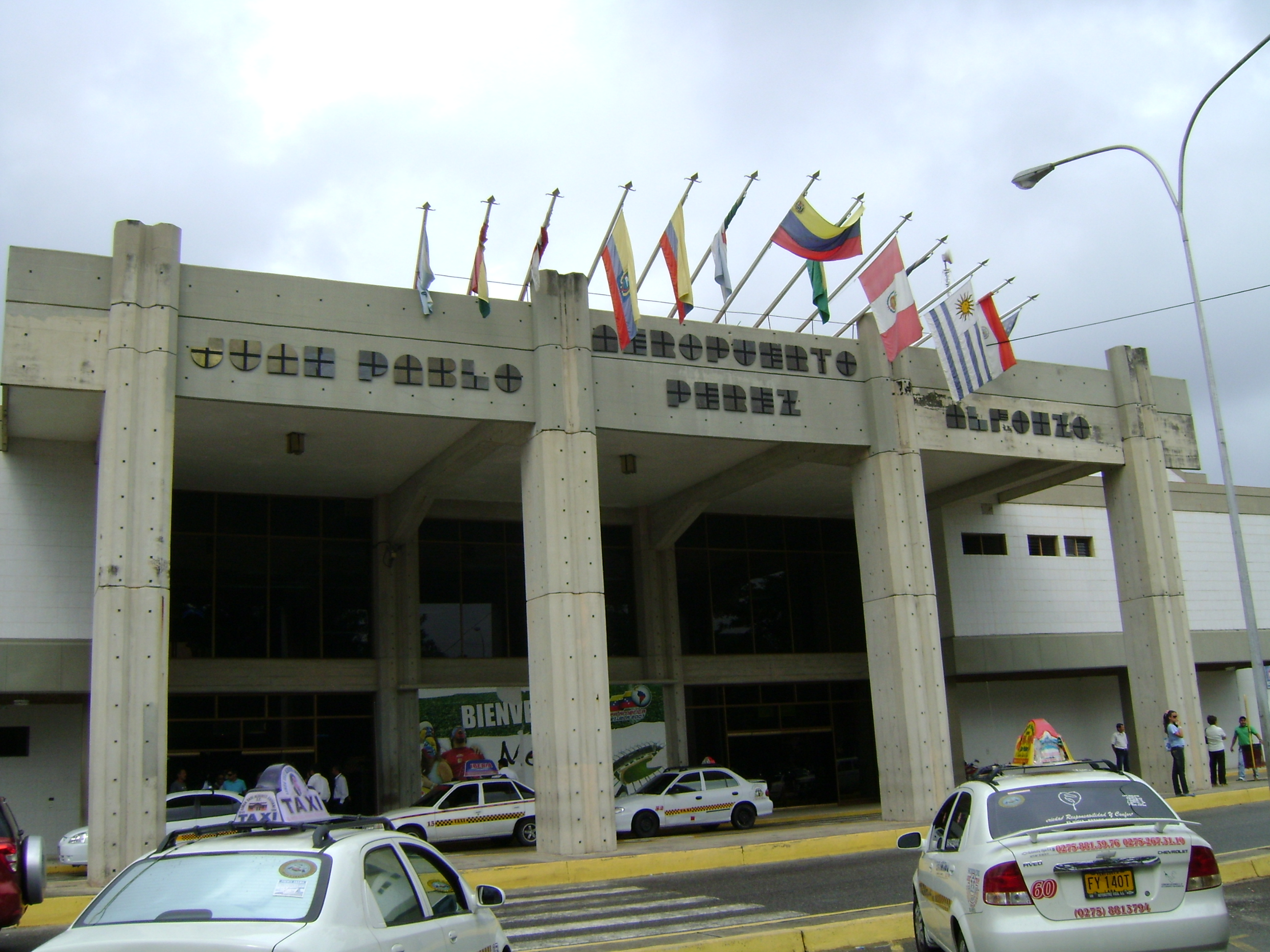
Aeropuerto Juan Pablo Pérez Alfonzo

After the 1973 oil crisis, economic prosperity for Venezuela was relatively short-lived. In 1976 Pérez Alfonzo gave an intuitive warning about what economists now call the "natural resource curse": "Ten years from now, twenty years from now, you will see, oil will bring us ruin... It is the devil's excrement." This was the case during the "1980s oil glut". OPEC member countries were not adhering strictly to their assigned quotas, and once again oil prices plummeted.

Pérez Alfonzo died in Washington, D.C., at the Georgetown University Hospital on 3 September 1979, at age 75, having succumbed to pancreatic cancer.

El Vigía's Juan Pablo Pérez Alfonzo Airport was named in his honor in 1991.

Since 1998, the Orden Juan Pablo Pérez Alfonzo (Order of Juan Pablo Pérez Alfonzo) is the Venezuelan award of state given to those who contribute to works related to mining, petroleum, and energy.

== Books ==
- Petróleo: jugo de la tierra. Caracas: Editorial Arte, 1961.
- La Dinámica del petróleo en el progreso de Venezuela. Caracas: Central University of Venezuela, 1965.
- Petróleo de vida o muerte (debate with Arturo Uslar Pietri). Caracas: Editorial Arte, 1966.
- El pentágono petrolero: la política nacionalista de defensa y conservación del petroleo. Caracas: Revista Política, 1967.
- ¿Hasta cuándo los abusos de La Electricidad?: informe sobre el caso Guarenas. Guarenas: Municipal Council, 1969.
- Petróleo y dependencia. Caracas: Síntesis Dos Mil, 1971.
- Hundiéndonos en el excremento del diablo. Caracas: Editorial Lisbona, 1976.
- El desastre (with Domingo Alberto Rangel and Pedro Duno). Valencia: Vadell Hermanos, 1976.
- Alternativas (with Iván Loscher). Caracas: Garbizu & Todtmann Editores, 1976.
- Venezuela y el petróleo. Caracas: Centro Gumilla, 1976.
