= Khalid bin Talal Al Saud =

Saudi royal and businessman (born 1962)

- Born: 10 January 1962 (age 63); Riyadh, Saudi Arabia
- Spouse: Jazzi bint Saud bin Abdulaziz Al Saud (m. 1988)
- House: Al Saud
- Father: Talal bin Abdulaziz Al Saud
- Mother: Mona El Solh
- Occupation: Businessman

Khalid bin Talal Al Saud (Arabic: خالد بن طلال بن عبد العزيز آل سعود; born 10 January 1962) is a member of the Saudi royal family, one of the grandsons of Saudi's founder King Abdulaziz, and the owner of Al Nafood Trading Establishment.

== Early life ==
Prince Khalid was born on 10 January 1962 to the Lebanese Mona El Solh, daughter of Riad as-Solh, the first prime minister of Lebanon, and Prince Talal bin Abdulaziz. He is full brother of Prince Al Waleed bin Talal.

== Background ==
The prisoner-exchange agreement signed between Israel and Hamas in October 2011 that arranged for the release of Israeli soldier Gilad Shalit and over 1,000 mainly Palestinian and Arab-Israeli prisoners was received with disapproval by some members of the Israeli public. Subsequent to this exchange, according to comments made by Saudi cleric Awad Al-Qarni and reiterated by Prince Khalid, one Israeli family offered $100,000 for the capture of a Palestinian man released under the deal who they believed was responsible for the 1998 death of one of their relatives. As of late October 2011, news agencies were reporting at least two such $100,000 bounties on-offer by Israeli extremist groups for the killing of Palestinians who were released in the exchange and who they believe to have been responsible for the killing of Israelis.

== Controversy ==
As part of conservative wing in Saudi royal family, Khalid said he had been forced to speak out after quiet efforts to advise his brother to mend his ways had fallen on deaf ears. Khalid, told an Arabic website that his brother's plan to introduce cinema into Saudi society was the straw that broke the camel's back. This was a reference to a Saudi film financed by Al Waleed bin Talal, and shown in Saudi Arabia in 2011 despite fierce opposition from Islamist activists.

On 29 October 2011, Prince Khalid stated that he would give $900,000 for the capture of any Israeli soldier for use as bargaining leverage in potential future negotiations with Israel for the release of Palestinians held in Israeli prisons, variously estimated in late October 2011 as between 5,000 and 7,000 persons. Details provided about his announcement varied considerably among the many media outlets that covered it, with some apparent contradictions among them, and with some reports excluding any mention of the previous bounty offers made by Israeli groups that the Prince said prompted his offer.

In what he described as a response to the $100,000 bounty offered by the Israeli family as described above, Saudi cleric Awad Al-Qarni offered his own bounty in the same $100,000 amount for the capture of any Israeli soldier, with the understanding that any soldier so captured would be used in a potential subsequent prisoner exchange to try to secure the release of some of the thousands of Palestinians who remain in Israeli prisons. Awad Al-Qarni's offer of one hundred thousand dollars for the capture of an Israeli soldier was met with a counter-offer of one million dollars for the killing of the Muslim cleric. "Dr Awad al-Qarni said he was offering $100,000 to only take a prisoner but they responded by offering $1 million to kill Awad al-Qarni," Prince Khalid stated according to a recording of a telephone call he placed to a private Saudi television network, and that was published by that network on its website.

In what he said was a response to the $1 million bounty offered by Israelis for the killing of Saudi cleric Awad Al-Qarni, Prince Khalid increased the cleric's offer of $100,000 for the capture of an Israeli soldier by $900,000, thus bringing the combined amount offered by the two men up to the same $1 million figure offered for the cleric's death. The Prince made the announcement in a 29 October 2011 telephone call to the Saudi kingdom's private al-Daleel television station.

=== Arrest ===
In December 2017, Khalid bin Talal was arrested for opposing the government's decision to remove the power of arrest from the Islamic religious police. After almost a year, in November 2018, he was freed from detention, after pressure on Mohammad bin Salman due to the killing of Jamal Khashoggi.

It was reported that he was re-arrested 4 days after his father's death in late December 2018.

== Personal life ==
He is former president of Saudi's Al-Hilal Volleyball Club.

In 1988, Prince Khalid married Jazzi bint Saud bin Abdulaziz Al Saud in Riyadh.

Khalid's son, Al-Waleed bin Khalid Al-Saud, was injured in a traffic accident in 2005 that left him in a coma. Al-Waleed remained comatose for more than twenty years, and died on 19 July 2025.
