= Al-Waleed bin Khalid Al-Saud =

Saudi prince (1989–2025)

Al-Waleed bin Khalid Al-Saud الوليد بن خالد آل سعود
- Born: 18 April 1989; Riyadh, Saudi Arabia
- Died: 19 July 2025 (aged 36); Riyadh, Saudi Arabia
Names
- Al-Waleed bin Khalid bin Talal bin Abdulaziz Al Saud
- House: Al Saud
- Father: Prince Khalid bin Talal Al Saud
- Mother: Princess al-Jazi bint Saud Al Saud

Al-Waleed bin Khalid bin Talal bin Abdulaziz Al Saud (Arabic: الوليد بن خالد بن طلال بن عبد العزيز آل سعود; 18 April 1989 – 19 July 2025) was a member of the Saudi royal family and the son of Prince Khalid bin Talal Al Saud. He was known in the media as the "Sleeping Prince" because he had been in a coma from 2005 following a car crash while studying at a military academy, which caused a brain injury. He later died in hospital 20 years later where he was receiving treatment.

== Biography ==
Al-Waleed was born on 18 April 1989. He was the eldest son of Prince Khalid bin Talal Al Saud and the grandson of Prince Talal bin Abdulaziz Al Saud, a member of the House of Saud, the ruling family of Saudi Arabia. His mother was Princess al-Jazi bint Saud, a daughter of King Saud. Al-Waleed was also the nephew of businessman Prince Alwaleed bin Talal.

In 2005, when he was 15, Al-Waleed was involved in a car crash while training at a military academy in London. The crash caused severe cerebral hemorrhage that left him in a coma, and he spent more than twenty years on life support at King Abdulaziz Medical City. Al-Waleed's condition received widespread coverage in Saudi and Arab media, particularly with the circulation of videos showing limited movements.

Al-Waleed died on 19 July 2025, after more than twenty years in a coma. He was 36.
