= Jordanian Revolutionary People's Party =

Jordanian political Party

Jordanian Revolutionary People's Party (Arabic: حزب الشعب الثوري الأردني) was a political party in Jordan. It was founded by the Jordanian sympathizers of the Popular Front for the Liberation of Palestine (PFLP). The party was the Jordanian section of the Arab Socialist Action Party. The party was later dissolved and its members joined the PFLP.

== See also ==
- List of political parties in Jordan
- Jordanian National Liberation Movement
