= Mohammed bin Nawwaf Al Saud =

Saudi royal and diplomat (born 1953)

Saudi Arabian Ambassador to the United Kingdom and Ireland
- In office: January 2005 – December 2018

Saudi Arabian Ambassador to Italy and Malta
- In office: July 1995 – December 2004
- Born: 22 May 1953 (age 73); Riyadh, Saudi Arabia
- Spouse: Fadwa bint Khaled bin Abdullah bin Abdul Rahman Al Saud
Names
- Mohammed bin Nawwaf bin Abdulaziz Al Saud
- House: House of Saud
- Father: Nawwaf bin Abdulaziz Al Saud
- Education: Georgetown University (BS); Harvard University (MPA)

Mohammed bin Nawwaf Al Saud (Arabic: محمد بن نواف بن عبدالعزيز آل سعود; born 22 May 1953) is a Saudi Arabian diplomat who served as the Saudi Arabian ambassador to Italy, Malta, the United Kingdom, and Ireland. He is a member of the Saudi ruling family, a grandson of King Abdulaziz.

== Early life and education ==
Prince Mohammed was born on 22 May 1953 in Riyadh, Saudi Arabia. He is the eldest son of Nawwaf bin Abdulaziz Al Saud, the twenty-second son of King Abdulaziz. Prince Mohammed was educated at the Capital Institute High School in Riyadh. He received a bachelor of science degree from the Edmund A. Walsh School of Foreign Service at Georgetown University in 1981. He also obtained an MPA degree from the John F. Kennedy School of Government, Harvard University. As of 2014 he was the president of the Harvard Alumni Association of Saudi Arabia.

== Career ==
Mohammed bin Nawwaf worked as a researcher in the international relations department at the Royal Commission for Jubail and Yanbu for two years before transferring to the Ministry of Foreign Affairs in February 1984 where he first worked in the minister's cabinet before being promoted to inspector general at the Ministry.

In 1995, Prince Mohammed was appointed ambassador to Italy and Malta. During his tenure, in 1998, he was elected as president of the council of administration for the Islamic Cultural Centre of Italy. He was also dean of the Arab ambassadors’ corps and among the columnists of Al Arabiya.

In December 2005, Prince Mohammed was appointed the Saudi ambassador to the United Kingdom and Ireland. He was the president of the Saudi British Society in London and the chairman of the King Fahd Academy's Board of Trustees. He was invited to and participated in the Queen's Jubilee luncheon organized at the Windsor Castle in May 2012, leading to criticisms of various human rights groups. His tenure ended in December 2018, and he was replaced by Prince Khalid bin Bandar Al Saud in the post.

== Personal life ==
Mohammed bin Nawwaf is married to Princess Fadwa bint Khalid bin Abdullah bin Abdul Rahman. They have five children. Fadwa was the honorary president of the Arab Italian Women's Association (AIWA), which was founded in May 2002 by Italian businesswomen and spouses of Saudi diplomats in Italy.

A daughter of Prince Mohammed and Princess Fadwa, Madawi, married Fahd bin Faisal bin Saud bin Mohammed at The Dorchester hotel in London on 24 January 2009. Fahd bin Faisal is a grandson of Itab bint Sultan, who was one of Prince Sultan’s favourite daughters. Prince Sultan arranged for a fleet of private jets to bring in 500 guests to the party, although he himself was not expected to attend. Another daughter of Mohammed and Fadwa is married to Faisal bin Sattam Al Saud who is the Saudi ambassador to Italy. Mohammed's son, Prince Mansoor, died in September 2009.

Mohammed bin Nawwaf is reported to be known for his lavish spending habits. In 2009, he bought a new 65-metre (213-foot) megayacht, adding another to his fleet of yachts. It was named Nourah of Riyadh which is the largest motor yacht built to date in Turkey.
