= Council of State (Ottoman Empire) =

Highest administrative court in the Ottoman Empire

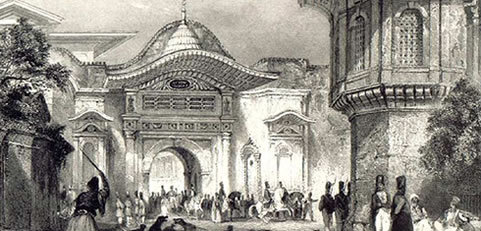
Sublime Port that was a synecdoche for Şura-yı Devlet.

The Council of State (Ottoman Turkish: Şûrâ-yı Devlet, شوراى دولت) was the high legislative institution in the Ottoman Empire that corresponds to the present-day Council of State of Turkey. It served between the years 1868 and 1922.

== Early formation ==
The foundations of Şûrâ-yı Devlet can be traced back to the Supreme Council of Judicial Ordinances, established by Sultan Mahmud II in 1837. This court laid the groundwork for the current Council of State and the Court of Cassation (Yargıtay). In 1839, with the Edict of Gülhane, the Ottoman people were promised the guarantee of their natural rights, such as life, property, honor, and dignity, regardless of religion or sect. This marked the establishment of the principles of a new legal state, emphasizing the necessity for the administration (state) to adhere to legal rules.

== Division ==
In 1868, during the reign of Sultan Abdulaziz, the Supreme Council of Judicial Ordinances was divided into two institutions: Şûrâ-yı Devlet, responsible in name and function of a Council of State, and the Council of Judicial Regulations [Divan-ı Ahkâmı Adliye], which performed the functions of the Court of Cassation. This separation led to the distinction between the judiciary and the legislature. The Council of State was assigned two roles: preparing draft laws and resolving administrative disputes. Council of Judicial Regulations, on the other hand, was solely responsible for the judicial function.

== Inauguration ==
In a speech on May 10, 1868, Sultan Abdulaziz officially inaugurated the working of the Council of State. Its duties included examining and organizing regulations and ordinances, examining public interests, overseeing the government and individuals' activities related to the state's affairs, and implementing judicial proceedings. However, with the enactment of the 1876 Ottoman Constitution, the jurisdiction of the Council of State became significantly limited as the resolution of "disputes between the government and individuals" was transferred to general courts.

== Closure ==
After serving for 54 years during the Ottoman period, the Council of State came to an end on November 4, 1922, when all central institutions in Istanbul were transferred to the administration of the Grand National Assembly of Turkey (TBMM). The Council of State of the Turkish Republic (Danıştay) was established by Law No. 669 and began its operations on July 6, 1927.

== See also ==
- Council of State of Turkey
