= Communist Party in Saudi Arabia =

Communist Party in Saudi Arabia الحزب الشيوعي في السعودية
- Leader: Mustafa Wahba
- Founded: August 31, 1975
- Dissolved: 1991
- Newspaper: Tareeq al-Kadiḥeen
- Youth wing: Union of Democratic Youth – Saudi Arabia
- Ideology: Communism; Marxism-Leninism
- Political position: Far-left

The Communist Party in Saudi Arabia (Arabic: الحزب الشيوعي في السعودية, al-Hizb ash-Shuyu'i fi as-Sa'udiyah) was a political party in Saudi Arabia.

== History ==
The Communist Party in Saudi Arabia (CPSA) was formed on August 31, 1975. It had its origins in the National Renewal Front which was founded on September 23, 1954 and transformed in the National Liberation Front on October 17, 1958. The NLF was part of the Arab National Liberation Front since 1963. The communists inside the NLF had a separate organization called the Organization of Saudi Communists (OSC). The groups were targeted by a wave of arrests between 1968 and 1969. The remainder of the NLF founded the CPSA in 1975. The party membership in 1975 was however very small, and is thought to have numbered as few as 30 members. The first secretary general of the CPSA was Mustafa Wahba, a son of Hafiz Wahba, who was one of the advisors of King Abdulaziz. Mustafa Wahba used the alias Mahdi Habib in the post. He held the title until 1991 when the party was dissolved.

Declining popularity caused by the collapse of the Soviet Union and the rise in popularity of political Islamism caused the party to rename itself as Democratic Assembly of Saudi Arabia (Arabic: التجمع الديموقراطي في السعودية) and take up the cause of democratic reform in the early 1990s. Soon thereafter, the government released the political prisoners of the party in exchange that the party promised to disband.

== Structure ==
UDYS symbol

The CPSA had a youth organization, the Union of Democratic Youth – Saudi Arabia (Ittihad ash-Shabab ad-Dimuqrati fi as-Sa'udiyah), with its office in Damascus, Syria. Other organizations close to the CPSA were the Workers' Federation of Saudi Arabia, the National Union of Students of Saudi Arabia (NUSSA) and the Democratic Women's League of Saudi Arabia.

Its central organ was Tareeq al-Kadiḥeen ("Way of the Toilers").

The party was always illegal and persecuted by the regime.

Shiites were attracted to Saudi opposition groups, including the Communist Party, due to resentment at discrimination against them on religious grounds by the Saudi Government. As a result, the bulk of the members of the Communist Party were members of Saudi Arabia's Shiite community.

== Ideology ==
Saudi Communist Party literature was filled with critiques of the Saudi economy, discrimination against women, and of the pro-Western foreign policy of the Saudi ruling family. The Communist Party also criticized the Saudi ruling family as being corrupt.

The CPSA had close relations with other Arab communist parties and was a pro-Soviet party. In its previous inception as the National Liberation Front, the group had pursued closer ties with the National Liberation Front – Bahrain.

As part of the restructuring of the party in the early 1990s, the new Democratic Assembly took up the cause of democratic reform.

== See also ==
- List of political parties in Saudi Arabia
