= Joseph A. Kéchichian =

Lebanese/American political scientist (born 1954)

Joseph Kéchichian
- Born: March 15, 1954 (age 72); Beirut, Lebanon
- Education: University of Virginia
- Known for: Power and Succession in Arab Monarchies, Succession in Saudi Arabia
- Scientific career
- Fields: Middle Eastern studies, Persian Gulf studies
- Workplaces: University of Virginia, RAND Corporation, UCLA, Stanford University, Middle East Institute

Joseph Albert Kéchichian (French pronunciation: [Keʃiʃian], born March 15, 1954) is an American political scientist.

== Biography ==
Kéchichian received his doctorate in Foreign Affairs from the University of Virginia in 1985, where he also taught (1986-1988), and assumed the assistant deanship in international studies (1988-1989). In the summer of 1989, he was a Hoover Fellow at Stanford University (under the U.S. State Department Title VIII Program). Between 1990 and 1996, he labored at the Santa Monica-based RAND Corporation as an Associate Political Scientist, and was a lecturer at the University of California in Los Angeles (UCLA).

Between 1998 and 2001, Kéchichian was a fellow at UCLA’s Gustav E. von Grunebaum Center for Near Eastern Studies, where he held a Smith Richardson Foundation grant (1998-1999) to compose Succession in Saudi Arabia (New York: Palgrave [2001]) and Beirut and London: Dar Al Saqi, 2002, 2003 [2nd ed] (for the Arabic translation)]. He published Political Participation and Stability in the Sultanate of Oman, Dubai: Gulf Research Center, 2005, Oman and the World: The Emergence of an Independent Foreign Policy (Santa Monica: RAND [1995]), and edited A Century in Thirty Years: Shaykh Zayed and the United Arab Emirates (Washington, D.C.: The Middle East Policy Council [2000]), as well as Iran, Iraq, and the Arab Gulf States (New York: Palgrave [2001]). In 2003, he co-authored, with R. Hrair Dekmejian at USC, The Just Prince: A Manual of Leadership (London: Saqi Books), which includes a full translation of the Sulwan al-Muta` by Muhammad Ibn Zafar al-Siqilli.

In 2008, he published two studies, Power and Succession in Arab Monarchies (Boulder, Colorado: Lynne Rienner Publishers, and Beirut: Riyad al-Rayyes Books, 2012—in 2 volumes for the Arabic translation]), and Faysal: Saudi Arabia’s King for All Seasons Gainesville, Florida: University Press of Florida and Beirut: Dar al-‘Arabiyyah lil-Mawsu‘at, 2012]. His newest book is Legal and Political Reforms in Sa‘udi Arabia, published by Routledge in December 2012. He published a companion volume to Faysal on ‘Iffat Al Thunayan: An Arabian Queen (London: Sussex Academic Press, 2014).

== Works ==
- From Alliance to Union, Sine loco : Sussex Academic Press, 2016 (upcoming, August?)
- Power and Succession in Arab Monarchies, Boulder, Colorado: Lynne Rienner Publishers, 2008, ISBN 1-58826-556-0
- Faysal: Saudi Arabia's King for All Seasons, Gainesville, Florida: University Press of Florida, 2008, ISBN 978-0-8130-3242-9
- Political Participation and Stability in the Sultanate of Oman, Dubai, United Arab Emirates: Gulf Research Center, 2005
- The Just Prince: A Manual of Leadership, London, England: Saqi Books, 2003, ISBN 0-86356-783-5
- Succession in Saudi Arabia, New York City, United States: Palgrave, 2001, ISBN 0-312-23880-0, Beirut and London: Dar Al Saqi, 2002, 2003 [2nd edition (for the Arabic language translation), ISBN 1-85516-445-0
- Oman and the World: The Emergence of an Independent Foreign Policy, Santa Monica, California: RAND, 1995, ISBN 0-8330-2332-2

“The Enduring Saudi Oil Power,” in Robert E. Looney, ed, Handbook of Oil Politics, London and New York: Routledge, 2012, pp. 284–294.

- The Sultanate of Oman and the US, in Robert E. Looney, ed, Handbook of US-Middle East Relations: Formative Factors and Regional Perspectives, London and New York City: Routledge, 2009, pp. 417–433.
- Reforming the Judiciary in Saudi Arabia, in The Kingdom of Saudi Arabia, 1979-2009: Evolution of a Pivotal State, A Special Edition of Viewpoints, Washington, D.C.: The Middle East Institute, 2009, at http://www.mei.edu/Publications/WebPublications/Viewpoints/ViewpointsArchive/tabid/541/ctl/Detail/mid/1623/xmid/784/xmfid/11/Default.aspx
- Refining the Saudi ‘Will to Power’, Perspectives 003, National University of Singapore Middle East Institute, Singapore, 2009, pp 1–16 at http://www.mei.nus.edu.sg/publications/MEI%20Perspectives%20003-Final.pdf
- Affirming the Saudi Will to Power: Domestic Challenges to King `Abdullah, Middle East Institute Policy Brief, Number 16 (June 2008), pp. 1-9 at https://web.archive.org/web/20090503081050/http://www.mideasti.org/policy-brief/affirming-saudi-will-power-domestic-challenges-king-%E2%80%98abdullah
- Can Conservative Arab Gulf Monarchies Endure a Fourth War in the Persian Gulf, The Middle East Journal, 61:2 (Spring 2007), pp. 283-306.
- Extremism & Opposition Movements on the Arabian Peninsula, ORF Studies in Muslim Societies-V, New Delhi: Observer Research Foundation, 2006, pp. 1-55.
- Democratization in Gulf Monarchies: A New Challenge to the GCC, Middle East Policy 11:4 (Winter 2004), pp. 37-57.
- Testing the Saudi ‘Will to Power:’ Challenges Confronting Prince Abdallah, Middle East Policy 10:4 (Winter 2003), pp. 100–115.
- The Burden of Saudi Arabia [Review Article], The Middle East Journal 57:3, (Summer 2003), pp. 492–497.
- The Throne in the Sultanate of Oman, in Joseph Kostiner (ed.), Middle Eastern Monarchies: The Challenge of Modernity, Boulder, Colorado and London: Lynne Rienner Publishers, 2000, pp. 187–211.
- Saudi Arabia’s Will to Power, Middle East Policy 7:2 (February 2000), pp. 47–60.
- Trends in Saudi National Security, The Middle East Journal, 53:2 (spring 1999), pp. 232–53.

=== Editor ===
- A Century in Thirty Years: Shaykh Zayed and the United Arab Emirates, Washington, D.C.: Middle East Policy Council, 2000, ISBN 0-943182-08-5
- Iran, Iraq, and the Arab Gulf States, New York City, United States: Palgrave, 2001, ISBN 0-312-29388-7
