= Free Princes Movement =

Saudi liberal political movement

- Founder: Talal bin Abdulaziz Al Saud
- Founded: 1958
- Dissolved: 1964
- Ideology: Constitutional monarchy Democratic reform Liberal democracy

The Free Princes Movement (Arabic: حركة الأمراء الأحرار; harikat al-umara’ al-ahrar) was a Saudi liberal political movement that existed from 1958 to 1964. Its members were known as the Young Najd (Najd al-Fattah in Arabic), Free Princes, and Liberal Princes.

== Establishment ==
The movement was founded by Talal bin Abdulaziz Al Saud because of the tensions between Crown Prince Faisal and King Saud. It was heavily idealized around the iconic figure of Gamal Abdel Nasser and his pan-Arab nationalism. It called for political reforms and a constitution.

The movement received support from the relatively liberal (and at the time, relatively small) Saudi middle class, but generally did not have a large base of support within the broader population. The movement was supported by Talal's brothers, Nawwaf bin Abdulaziz, Fawwaz bin Abdulaziz, Majid bin Abdulaziz and Badr bin Abdulaziz. Another brother, Prince Abdul Muhsin, vocally supported the movement and suggested a constitutional monarchy. In addition, the movement was also supported by younger princes from the cadet branches of the House of Saud. Another significant ally was then oil minister Abdullah Tariki. Crown Prince Faisal expelled many of its members to Lebanon and later pardoned them when he became king.

== Internal royal opposition ==
Prince Talal suggested the creation of a national council in 1958. The group drafted its own constitution which placed more power in the hands of the cabinet, removed most of the authority of the King, and created a partially-elected advisory committee. Most members of the Al Saud were strongly opposed to the movement, and both King Saud and Crown Prince Faisal repudiated its reforms initially. It was also attacked as "crypto-communist" by Saud.

In May 1960, Prince Talal told the Egyptian newspaper Al Gomhuria of a gradual trend towards a "constituent assembly, first constitution, supreme court, and a supreme planning commission". He went on to say "the problem is how to accomplish this experiment."

However, in December 1960, Talal's supporters formed a coalition with Saud to undermine Faisal's growing influence. Saud promoted Talal from minister of transport to minister of finance. But in a turn of events, the movement began to support many of Crown Prince Faisal's reforms.

In the late 1961, King Saud began to lose considerable support in the House of Saud. Ironically, he increasingly became dependent on the few Nasserite nationalists in his Cabinet. Saud reconciled with Faisal under Faisal's precondition to remove the movement entirely from the Cabinet. The members of the movement were exiled to Lebanon; for the next few years, Prince Talal moved between Beirut and Cairo.

At the end of 1962, they formed the Arab National Liberation Front ('Free Saudis Movement') in Cairo, commonly referred to as Free Princes Movement.

== Egyptian link and Yemen revolution ==
Its name originates from the Free Officers Movement, a group led by Nasser that overthrew the Egyptian monarchy.

Talal applauded Nasser after Egypt's successful long-range missile tests. Even after Nasser called for the overthrow of the Al Saud in Saudi Arabia by stating "to liberate all Jerusalem, the Arab peoples must first liberate Riyadh", Talal went to Cairo to meet Egypt's military brass. Talal's supporters (Prince Fawwaz, Prince Badr, and a cousin, Saad bin Fahd) also self-exiled to Cairo.

Yemen's revolution, which evolved into a cold war between Saudi Arabia and Egypt, led to increased power for the Free Princes, which did not call for the complete overthrow of the Saudi monarchy but simply major democratic reforms. In September 1962 Egyptian, Syrian, and Yemeni radio stations openly encouraged Saudis to rebel against their "corrupt" and "reactionary" monarchy and for its supplanting with members of the Free Princes.

== Estrangement with Nasser ==
Soon, Radio Yemen (an Egyptian-controlled organ) called for the assassination of the Al Saud including the Free Princes. That was one reason that the Free Princes became increasingly embittered with Nasser.

In August 1963, Talal declared that he was "entirely wrong" in the past and praised Faisal's reforms. By early 1964, the Free Princes returned from exile in Beirut. The movement ended.
