= Talal bin Abdulaziz Al Saud =

Saudi royal, government official and businessman (1931–2018)

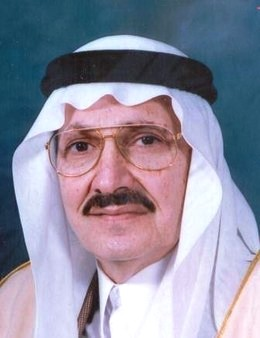

Minister of Communications
- In office: 1952 – April 1955
- Predecessor: Office established
- Successor: Office abolished
- Monarch: Abdulaziz; Saud
- Born: 15 August 1931; Ta'if, Kingdom of Nejd and Hejaz
- Died: 22 December 2018 (aged 87); Riyadh, Saudi Arabia
- Burial: 23 December 2018; Al Oud Cemetery, Riyadh
- Spouse: Umm Faisal; Mona Al Solh; Moudie bint Abdul Mohsen Alangary; Magdah bint Turki Al Sudairi
- Issue: 15
Names
- Talal bin Abdulaziz bin Abdul Rahman
- House: Al Saud
- Father: King Abdulaziz
- Mother: Munaiyir

Talal bin Abdulaziz Al Saud (Arabic: طلال بن عبد العزيز آل سعود Ṭalāl bin ʿAbdulʿazīz Āl Saʿūd; 15 August 1931 – 22 December 2018), also known as the Red Prince, was a Saudi Arabian politician, dissident, businessman, and philanthropist. A member of the House of Saud, he was notable for his liberal stance, striving for a national constitution, the full rule of law and equality before the law. He was also the leader of Free Princes Movement in the 1960s.

== Early life ==
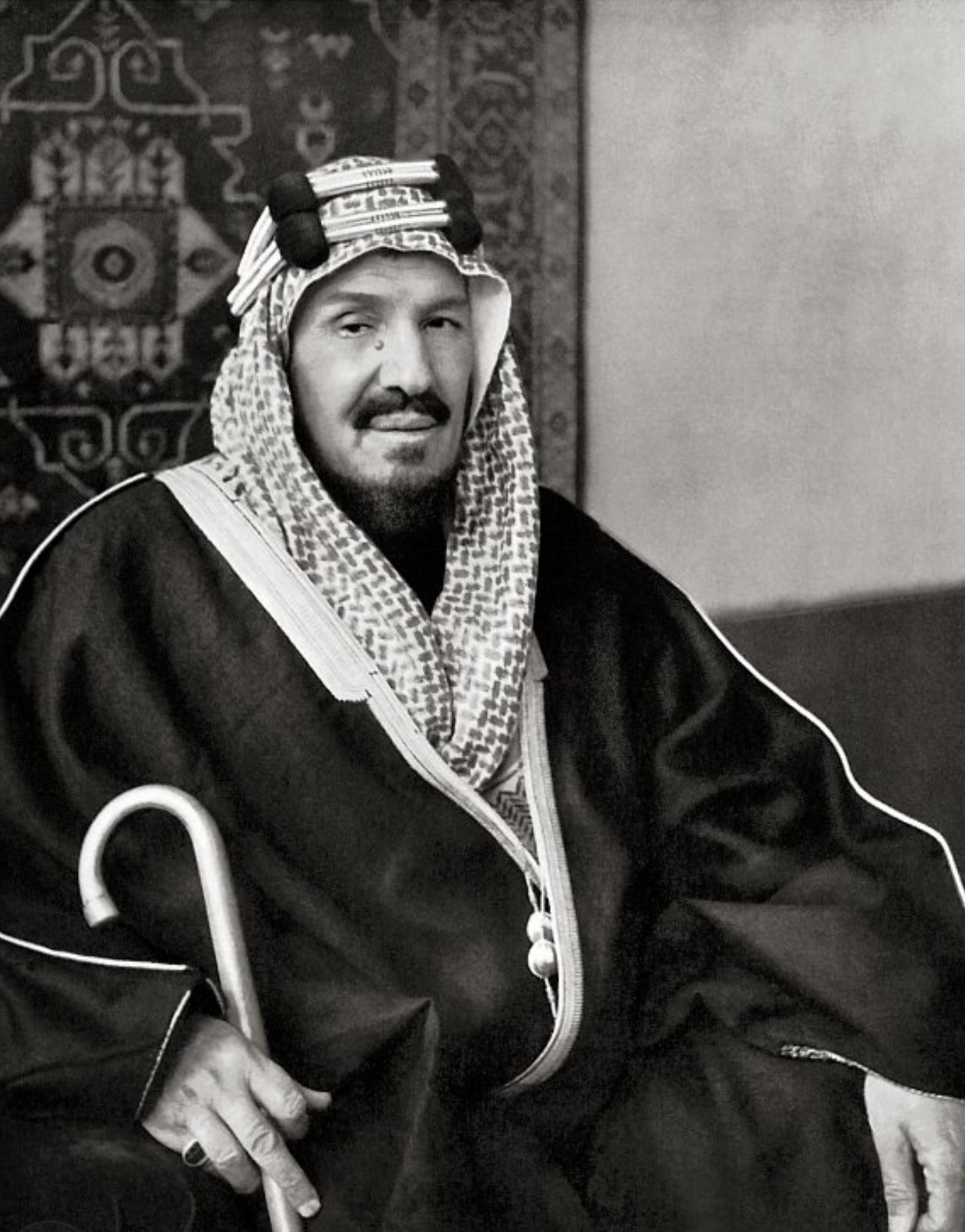
Talal's father King Abdulaziz

Prince Talal was born in Shubra Palace, Taif, on 15 August 1931 as the twentieth son of King Abdulaziz. His mother was an Armenian woman, Munaiyir, whose family escaped from the Ottoman Empire between 1915 and 1923, a period of turmoil in Armenia. Munaiyir was presented by the emir of Unayza in 1921, when she was 12 years old, to the 45-year-old Abdulaziz. Their first child was born when she was 15 years old, a son named Talal. Following tradition, Munaiyir became known as Umm Talal, "mother of Talal". However, in 1927, the three-year-old Talal died. In 1931, a second son was born to the couple, and was named Talal in honor of his late brother, following local tradition; thus, Munaiyir continued to be addressed as Umm Talal. He was followed by another son, Nawwaf, and a daughter, Madawi. It is unknown when Abdulaziz divorced his fourth wife and formally wed Munaiyir. She is reported by her family to have remained illiterate all her life and to have converted to Islam. British diplomats in Saudi Arabia regarded Munaiyir as one of Abdulaziz's favourite wives. She was as known for her intelligence as for her beauty. She died in December 1991.

During the reign of King Saud, Talal and Nawwaf became bitter enemies, to the point of contesting their inheritances. Their full sister, Princess Madawi, died in November 2017.

== Positions held ==
=== Minister of Communications ===
Prince Talal was made minister of communications when the office was established in 1952. Prince Talal became one of the wealthiest young princes, but his bureau suffered major corruption problems. Then, King Abdulaziz created the ministry of the air force to represent all flight-related matters from his administration. Because Prince Talal and Prince Mishaal contended over who controlled the national airlines, Saudi Arabia was to have two separate fleets. The dispute ended when Prince Talal resigned in April 1955. Later, the ministry of communication was merged with the ministry of finance after Prince Talal's resignation. This allowed King Saud to skip choosing Talal's successor, which would have caused friction in the royal family no matter whom King Saud selected.

=== Ambassador to France and Spain ===
Prince Talal served as Saudi ambassador to France and Spain between 1955 and 1957.

=== Minister of Finance and National Economy ===
King Saud appointed Prince Talal as minister of finance and national economy in 1960. He was removed from office on 11 September 1961. The reason for his dismissal was his proposal to establish a constitution in Saudi Arabia in September 1961. However, King Saud had no intention or plan to reform the political system. Therefore, he forced Prince Talal to resign from the cabinet. First, Prince Muhammed bin Saud and then, his full brother Prince Nawwaf succeeded him in the post.

== Controversy ==
=== Free Princes Movement ===
After Prince Talal's palaces were searched by the Saudi Arabian National Guard while he was abroad, he held a press conference in Beirut on 15 August 1962. His statements caused a stir since he openly criticized and attacked the Saudi regime. As a consequence, his passport was withdrawn, his property confiscated, and some of his supporters in Saudi Arabia arrested. Soon the North Yemen Civil War began, and one week later, four crews of Saudi Arabian Airlines employees defected to Egypt. Prince Talal adopted the name of the 'Free Princes' in Cairo on 19 August 1962, and broadcast his progressive views on the Radio Cairo. Later, he, his half-brothers Fawwaz and Badr, and his cousin Fahd bin Saad began to make statements on behalf of the Saudi Liberation Front. After four years, during which King Faisal offered tremendous financial inducements to the Free Princes, the latter were again reconciled with the royal family.

In exile, his own family did not support him and even criticized him for his intensive sympathy with then Egyptian President Gamal Abdel Nasser, Saudi Arabia's foremost enemy. On 8 September 1963, The Sunday Telegraph reported that Talal's mother, Munaiyir told her son that he was being foolish, while his younger sister, Madawi, repeatedly asked him to come home. Although King Faisal reportedly refused to forgive Prince Talal, he privately assured his mother that his assets would be unfrozen and that he would be allowed to return home safely. On 23 February 1964, Prince Talal returned to Saudi Arabia, and upon his return he issued a statement acknowledging his mistake in criticizing the Saudi government.

== Views ==
In September 1961 Prince Talal called for establishing a constitutional monarchy in Saudi Arabia and for closing the Dhahran Air Base which had been constructed by the US. Although he served in the cabinet led by King Saud, in August 1962, Prince Talal argued that King Saud had no quality to be the ruler of the country in the 20th century. Years later Prince Talal expressed his regret to form a political movement, namely Free Princes, due to the fact that it was commonly considered as a threat to the monarchy.

On 6 June 1999 Prince Talal publicly reported that the Kingdom should "find a smooth way to pass the monarchy to the next generation, or face a power struggle after the era of old royals passes." After the September 11 attacks, he challenged the "potentially very confusing" claim that rulers and religious scholars should jointly decide affairs of state. In 2001 he openly stated his support for the establishment of an elected assembly in Saudi Arabia. In September 2007, he announced his desire to form a political party to advance his goal of liberalizing the country.

In 2009, Prince Talal stated, "King Abdullah is the ruler. If he wills it, it will be done." However, in March 2009, he called on King Abdullah to clarify the appointment of Prince Nayef as second deputy prime minister. He publicly questioned whether it would make Prince Nayef the next crown prince. Prince Nayef was in fact named crown prince in October 2011 following the death of his brother, Prince Sultan. Prince Talal was a member of the Allegiance Council when the members were named in 2007. He resigned from the Council in November 2011, apparently in protest of late Prince Nayef's appointment as Crown Prince. In April 2012, he said that the "hand of justice" should reach all the corrupt in Saudi Arabia, and called on the National Anti-Corruption Authority (NACA) to reach everyone, regardless of status. In his June 2012 Al Quds Al Arabi interview, Prince Talal stated that the princes on the Allegiance Council were not consulted on the succession of Prince Salman and that the Council became ineffective.

== Various official and honorary positions ==
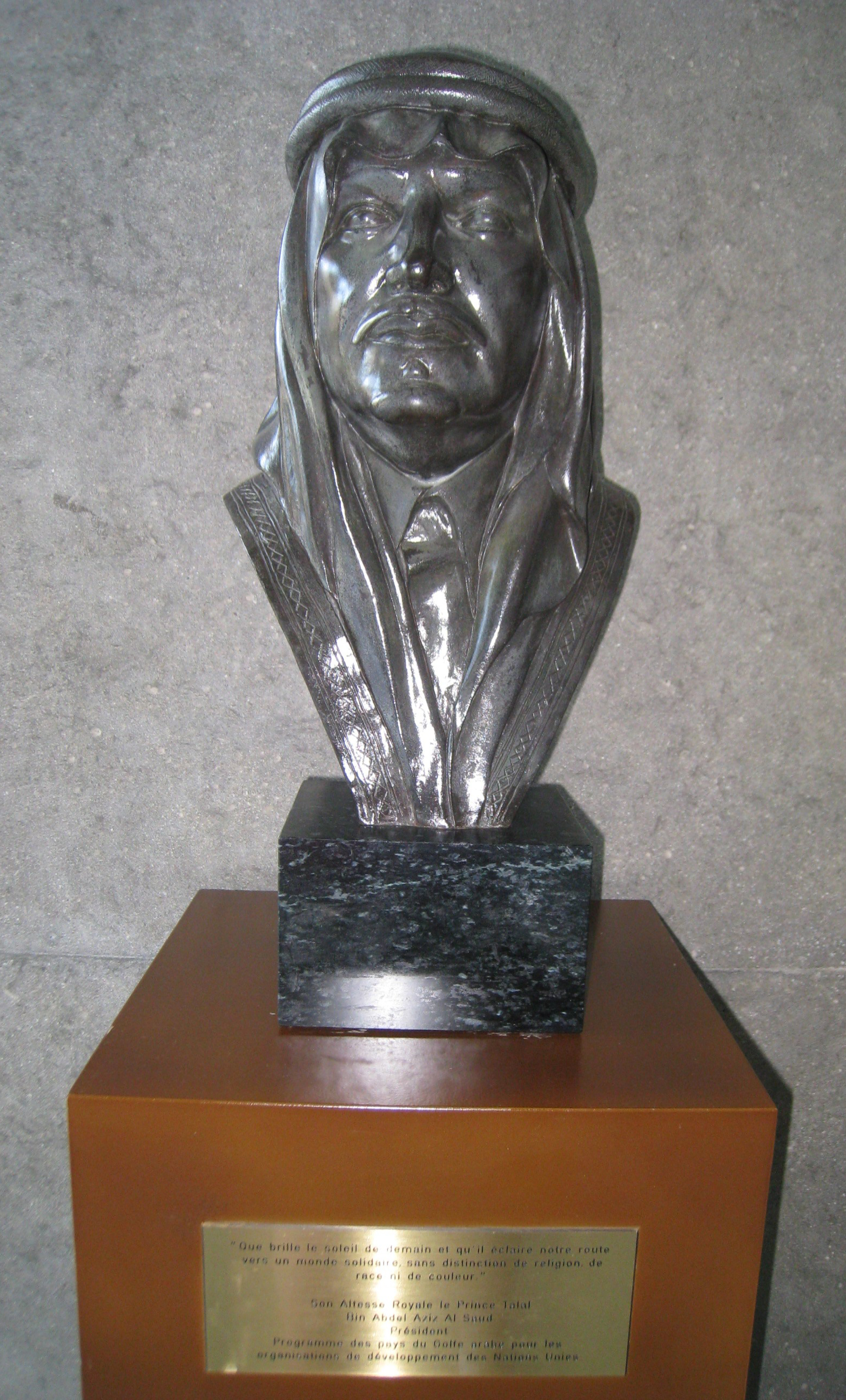
Bust of Talal bin Abdul-Aziz at the WHO building in Geneva, Switzerland

Prince Talal was one of the members of Al Saud Family Council which consisted of royals and was established by Crown Prince Abdullah in June 2000 to discuss private issues such as business activities of princes and marriages of princess to individuals who were not member of House of Saud.

Prince Talal was the chairman of Arab Gulf Program For The United Nations Development (AGFUND), which promoted socioeconomic development in the Middle East. As part of AGFUND, he led the board of trustees of the Arab Network for NGOs based in Cairo and established the Arab Open University. He also supported training of women through AGFUND. Through AGFUND, he provided significant monetary support for UNICEF and UNICEF declared him as its Special Envoy in 1980. He became UNESCO's Special Envoy for Water in 2002 to encourage the development of safe water.

Prince Talal was the president of the Arab Council for Childhood and Development. He also helped create the Mentor Foundation and was an honorary member of its board of trustees. He co-founded the Independent Commission for International Humanitarian Issues. He was also a prominent member of the League for Development of the Pasteur Institute and the honorary president of Saudi Society of Family and Community Medicine.

== Philanthropy ==
According to Riz Khan, "Prince Talal spent his post-political years developing humanitarian work, shedding the epithet 'The Red Prince' and becoming known as 'The Children's Prince' for his work with UNICEF, the United Nations Children's Fund."

== Personal life ==
Prince Talal married four times. He first married Umm Faisal, who is the mother of Faisal. He later divorced her.

Next, Talal married Mona Al Solh, a daughter of Riad Al Solh, the first prime minister of Lebanon. Their children are Prince Al Waleed, Prince Khalid and Princess Reema. They married in September 1954. The marriage collapsed in 1962; they remained separated until their divorce in 1968. One of his brothers in law was Prince Moulay Abdallah of Morocco, brother of King Hassan II of Morocco. Prince Abdallah of Morocco was married to another daughter of Riad Al Solh. Prince Talal hired one professor from the University of Houston and an instructor to teach English, psychology and Western civilization to his daughter Reema, who was 18 years old, in Riyadh in 1976.

His third wife was Moudie bint Abdul Mohsen Al Angari. They had three children: a son, Turki, and two daughters, Sara and Noura. Moudie and Talal were later divorced, and she died in 2008. In July 2012, their daughter Sara sought political asylum in the United Kingdom on the grounds that she was fearful for her safety in Saudi Arabia.

Lastly, Talal was married to Magdah bint Turki Al Sudairi, daughter of former Human Rights Commission President Turki bin Khaled Al Sudairi.

Prince Talal had a total of fifteen children, nine sons and six daughters. His sons are Faisal (died 1991), Al Waleed, Khalid, Turki, Abdulaziz, Abdul Rahman, Mansour, Mohammed and Mashour. His daughters are Reema, Sara, Noura, Al Jawhara, Hibatallah and Maha. From this information, it may be surmised that with his last wife, Magdah, he had six sons and three daughters. This may not be accurate, because he may also have had children by one or more concubines.

== Death ==
Prince Talal bin Abdulaziz Al Saud died in Riyadh on 22 December 2018. His son Prince Abdulaziz bin Talal tweeted in Arabic language: "Prince Talal bin Abdulaziz has passed away on Saturday. May God forgive him and grant him heaven". Funeral prayers were held at Imam Turki bin Abdullah Mosque, Riyadh, following day.
