= Faisal of Saudi Arabia =

King of Saudi Arabia from 1964 to 1975

Faisal
- Custodian of the Two Holy Mosques
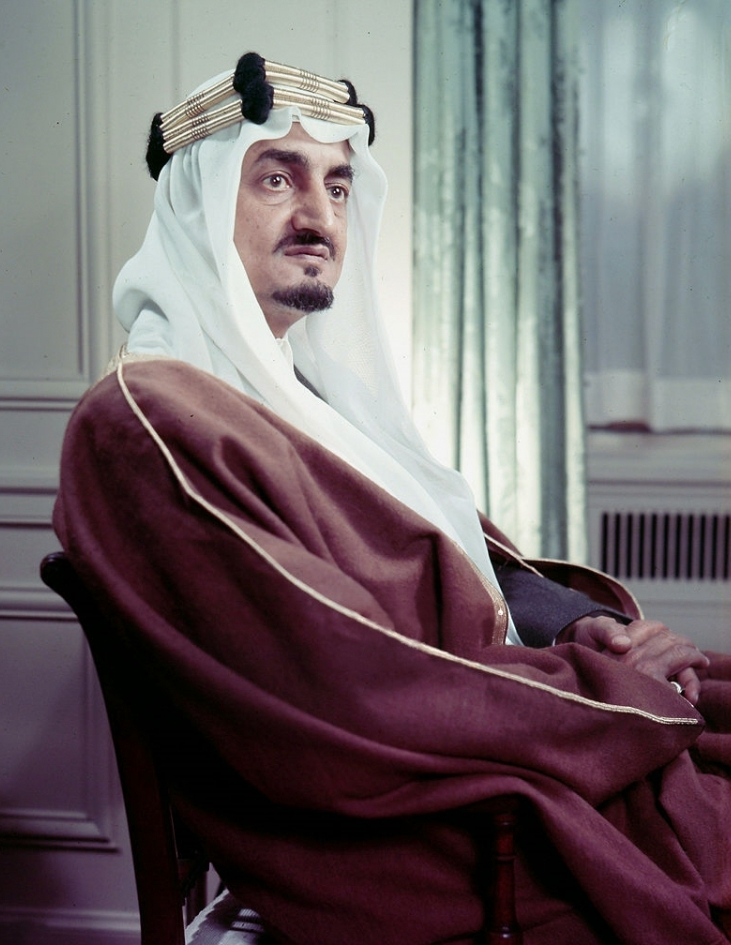
- Formal portrait, 1945

King of Saudi Arabia
- Reign: 2 November 1964 – 25 March 1975
- Bay'ah: 2 November 1964
- Predecessor: Saud
- Successor: Khalid

Regent of Saudi Arabia
- Tenure: 4 March 1964 – 2 November 1964
- Monarch: Saud

Prime Minister of Saudi Arabia
- Tenure: 16 August 1954 – 21 December 1960
- Predecessor: Saud bin Abdulaziz
- Successor: Saud bin Abdulaziz
- Tenure: 31 October 1962 – 25 March 1975
- Predecessor: Saud bin Abdulaziz
- Successor: Khalid bin Abdulaziz

Crown Prince of Saudi Arabia
- Tenure: 9 November 1953 – 2 November 1964
- Monarch: Saud
- Predecessor: Saud bin Abdulaziz
- Successor: Khalid bin Abdulaziz

Minister of Foreign Affairs
- Tenure: 19 December 1930 – 22 December 1960
- Monarch: Abdulaziz; Saud
- Predecessor: Office established
- Successor: Ibrahim bin Abdullah Al Suwaiyel
- Tenure: 16 March 1962 – 25 March 1975
- Monarch: Saud; Himself
- Predecessor: Ibrahim bin Abdullah Al Suwaiyel
- Successor: Saud Al Faisal

Viceroy of Hejaz
- Tenure: 9 February 1926 – 22 September 1932
- Monarch: Abdulaziz
- Successor: Khalid bin Abdulaziz

Chairman of the Majlis ash-Shura
- Tenure: 13 January 1926–25 March 1975
- Predecessor: Mohammed Al-Marzouki
- Successor: Khalid bin Abdulaziz Al Saud
- Born: 14 April 1906; Riyadh, Emirate of Riyadh
- Died: 25 March 1975 (aged 68); Riyadh, Saudi Arabia
- Cause of death: Gunshot wounds (assassination)
- Burial: 26 March 1975; Al-Oud cemetery, Riyadh
- Spouses: List: Sultana bint Ahmed Al Sudairi; Iffat bint Mohammad Al Thunayan; Al Jawhara bint Saud Al Kabir; Haya bint Turki Al Turki; Hessa bint Muhammad Al Muhanna Aba Al Khail; Munira bint Suhaim Al Thunayan Al Mahasher; Fatima bint Abdulaziz Al Shahrani
- Issue Among others ...: List: Prince Abdullah; Princess Sara; Prince Mohammed; Prince Saud; Prince Khalid; Prince Abdul Rahman; Prince Saad; Prince Bandar; Prince Turki; Princess Lolowah; Princess Haifa
Names
- Faisal bin Abdulaziz bin Abdul Rahman
- House: Al Saud
- Father: Abdulaziz of Saudi Arabia
- Mother: Tarfa bint Abdullah Al Sheikh
- Occupation: Politician; diplomat
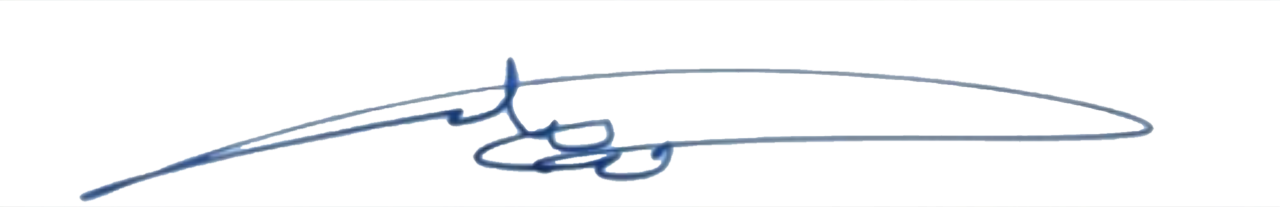
- Signature
- Military career
- Allegiance: Saudi Arabia
- Branch: Armed Forces of Saudi Arabia
- Service years: 1919–1975
- Conflicts: Unification of Saudi Arabia; First Arab–Israeli War; Buraimi Dispute; North Yemen Civil War; Al-Wadiah War; Six-Day War; Yom Kippur War

Faisal bin Abdulaziz Al Saud (Note: Arabic: فيصل بن عبدالعزيز آل سعود, romanized: Fayṣal ibn ʿAbd al-ʿAzīz Āl Suʿūd; Najdi Arabic pronunciation: [fæjsˤɑl ben ˈʕæbd ælʕæˈziːz ʔæːl sæˈʕuːd]) (14 April 1906 – 25 March 1975) was King of Saudi Arabia from 1964 until his assassination in 1975. Before his ascension, he served as Crown Prince of Saudi Arabia from 1953 to 1964, and he was briefly regent to his half-brother King Saud in 1964. He was prime minister from 1954 to 1960 and from 1962 to 1975. Faisal was the third son of King Abdulaziz, the founder of modern Saudi Arabia.

Faisal was born in Riyadh to Abdulaziz, then Emir of Nejd, (Note: Abdulaziz became Emir of Nejd in 1902 following the Battle of Riyadh. He became King of Hejaz in 1926, and he raised Nejd to a kingdom in 1927. Abdulaziz united the two kingdoms in 1932, reigning thereafter as King of Saudi Arabia until his death in 1953.) and Tarfa bint Abdullah Al Sheikh. Faisal's mother was from the Al ash-Sheikh family, which has produced many prominent Saudi religious leaders. Faisal emerged as an influential political figure during his father's reign. He served as viceroy of Hejaz from 1926 to 1932. He was the Saudi foreign minister from 1930 and prime minister from 1954 until his death, except for a two-year break in both positions from 1960 to 1962. After his father died in 1953 and his half-brother Saud became king, Faisal became crown prince, and in that position he outlawed slavery in Saudi Arabia. He persuaded King Saud to abdicate in his favour in 1964 with the help of other members of the royal family and his maternal cousin Muhammad ibn Ibrahim Al ash-Sheikh, Grand Mufti of Saudi Arabia.

Faisal implemented a policy of modernization and reform. His main foreign policy themes were pan-Islamism, anti-communism, anti-Zionism (Note: Faisal associated Communism with Zionism, which he also opposed.) and pro-Palestinianism. He attempted to limit the power of Islamic religious officials. Protesting against support that Israel received from the West, he led the oil embargo which caused the 1973 oil crisis. Faisal successfully stabilized the Kingdom's bureaucracy, and his reign had significant popularity among Saudi Arabians despite his reforms facing some controversy. Following his assassination by his nephew Faisal bin Musaid in 1975, he was succeeded by his half-brother Khalid.

== Early life and education ==
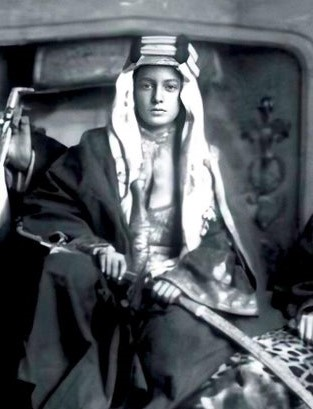
At the age of thirteen, during his visit to the United Kingdom in 1919

Faisal bin Abdulaziz was born in Riyadh on 14 April 1906. He was the third son of Abdulaziz bin Abdulrahman, then Emir of Nejd; Faisal was the first of his father's sons who was born in Riyadh. His mother was Tarfa bint Abdullah Al Sheikh, whom Abdulaziz had married in 1902 after capturing Riyadh. Tarfa was a descendant of the religious leader Muhammad bin Abdul Wahhab. Faisal's maternal grandfather, Abdullah bin Abdullatif Al Sheikh, was one of Abdulaziz's principal religious teachers and advisers. Faisal had an older full sister, Noura, who married her cousin Khalid bin Muhammad, a son of Abdulaziz's half-brother Muhammad bin Abdul Rahman. (Note: He also had many half-siblings, a number of whom would play an important role in his life and his reign, including King Saud, King Khalid, King Fahd, King Abdullah, and Prince Sultan.)

Tarfa bint Abdullah died in 1906, when Faisal was six months old. He then began to live with his maternal grandparents, Abdullah bin Abdullatif and Haya bint Abdul Rahman Al Muqbel, who educated their grandson. Under the mentorship of his grandfather, Prince Faisal completed his studies of reading the Qur'an and studying Islamic law and doctrines at the age of nine. He also learned horseback riding and politics from his father. His father influenced him militarily and politically, and at a young age, Faisal was chosen to represent his father in international forums.

According to Helen Chapin Metz, Faisal, and most of his generation, was raised in an atmosphere in which courage was extremely valued and reinforced. From 1916 he was tutored by Hafiz Wahba who later served in various governmental posts.

== Early political experience ==
Faisal looking at the first photograph of himself during his visit to the United Kingdom in 1919

As one of Abdulaziz's eldest sons, Faisal was given numerous responsibilities. In 1919 the British government invited Abdulaziz to visit London. He could not go, but he assigned his eldest son, Turki, as his envoy. However, Prince Turki died due to Spanish flu before the visit. Therefore, Faisal was sent to London instead, making him the first ever Saudi Arabian royal to visit England. His visit lasted for five months, and he met with British officials. During the same period, he also visited France, again being the first Saudi Arabian royal to pay an official visit there.

Abdulaziz gave his son Faisal many military duties to consolidate authority over Arabia. After the capture of Hail and initial control over Asir in 1922, Faisal was sent to these provinces with nearly six thousand fighters. He achieved complete control over Asir at the end of the year.

=== Viceroy of Hejaz and foreign minister ===
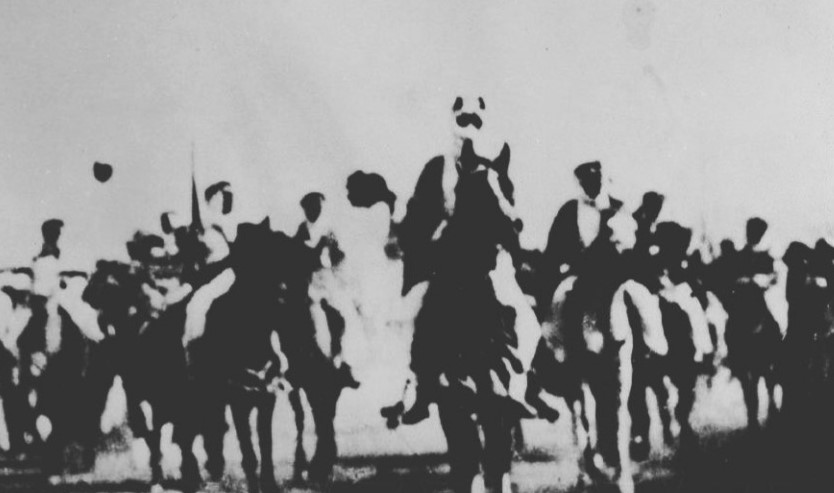
Leading the Asir campaign, 1922

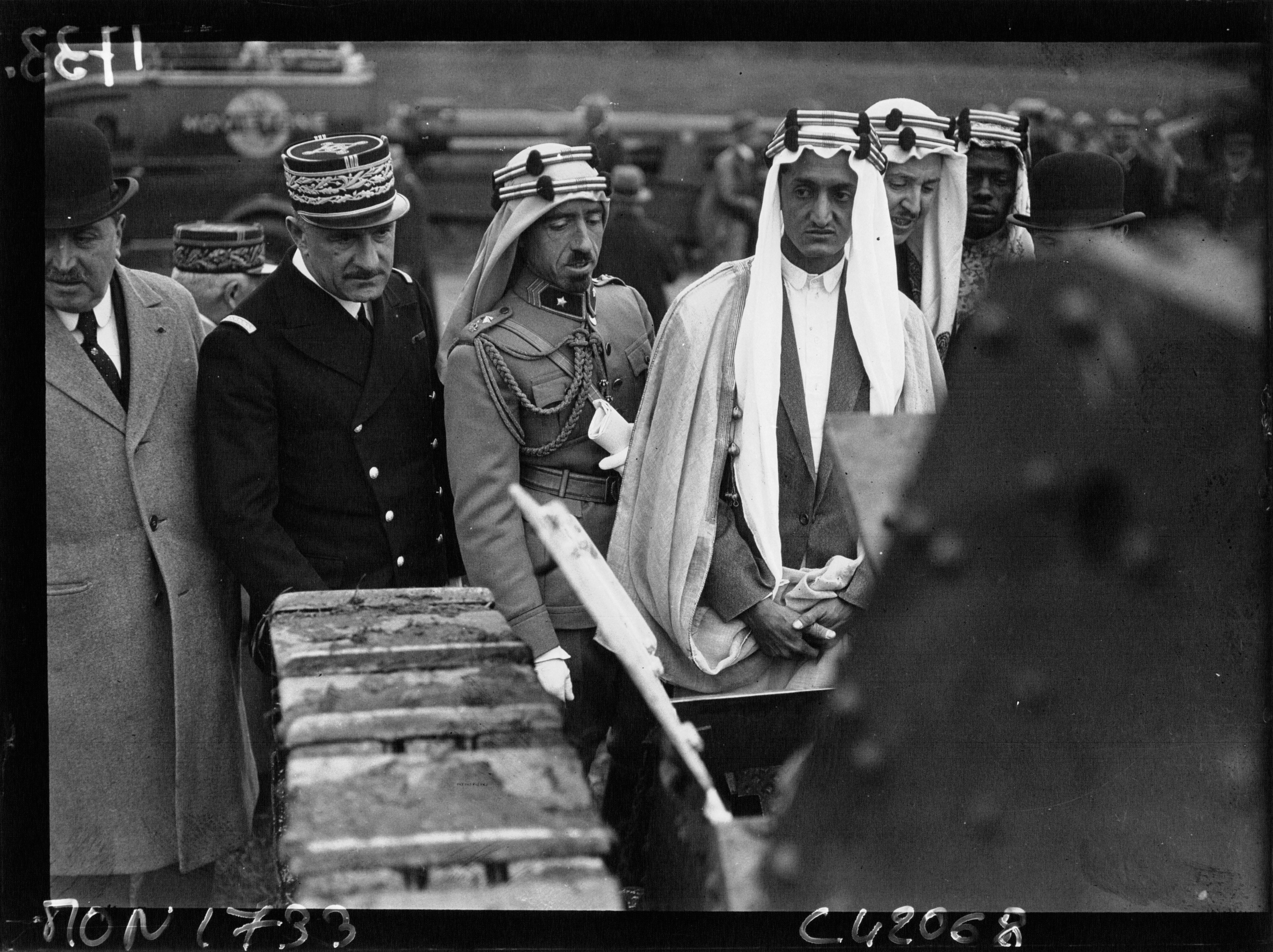
Visiting Camp de Satory in France, 1932

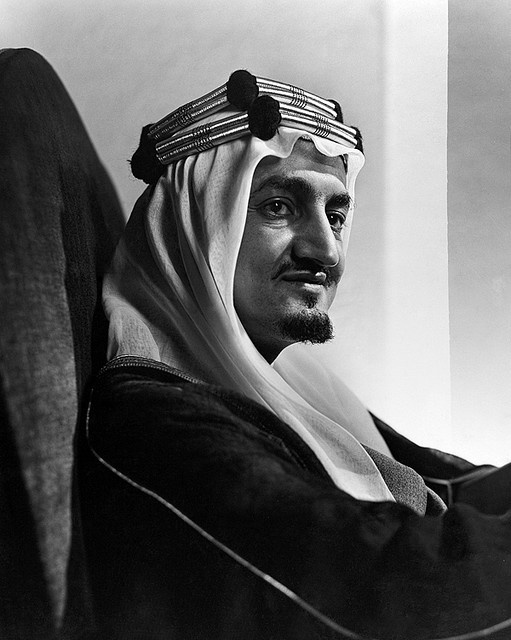
Faisal, as minister of foreign affairs, in 1942

Prince Faisal was appointed viceroy of Hejaz on 9 February 1926 following his father's takeover of the region. He often consulted with local leaders during his tenure. Faisal was the president of the Consultative Assembly and the minister of interior. In December 1931, following the announcement of the constitution of the Council of Deputies (Majlis al Wukala), he also became the president of the four-member council and minister of foreign affairs. He would continue to oversee Saudi foreign policy until his death—even as king, with only a two-year break between 1960 and 1962.

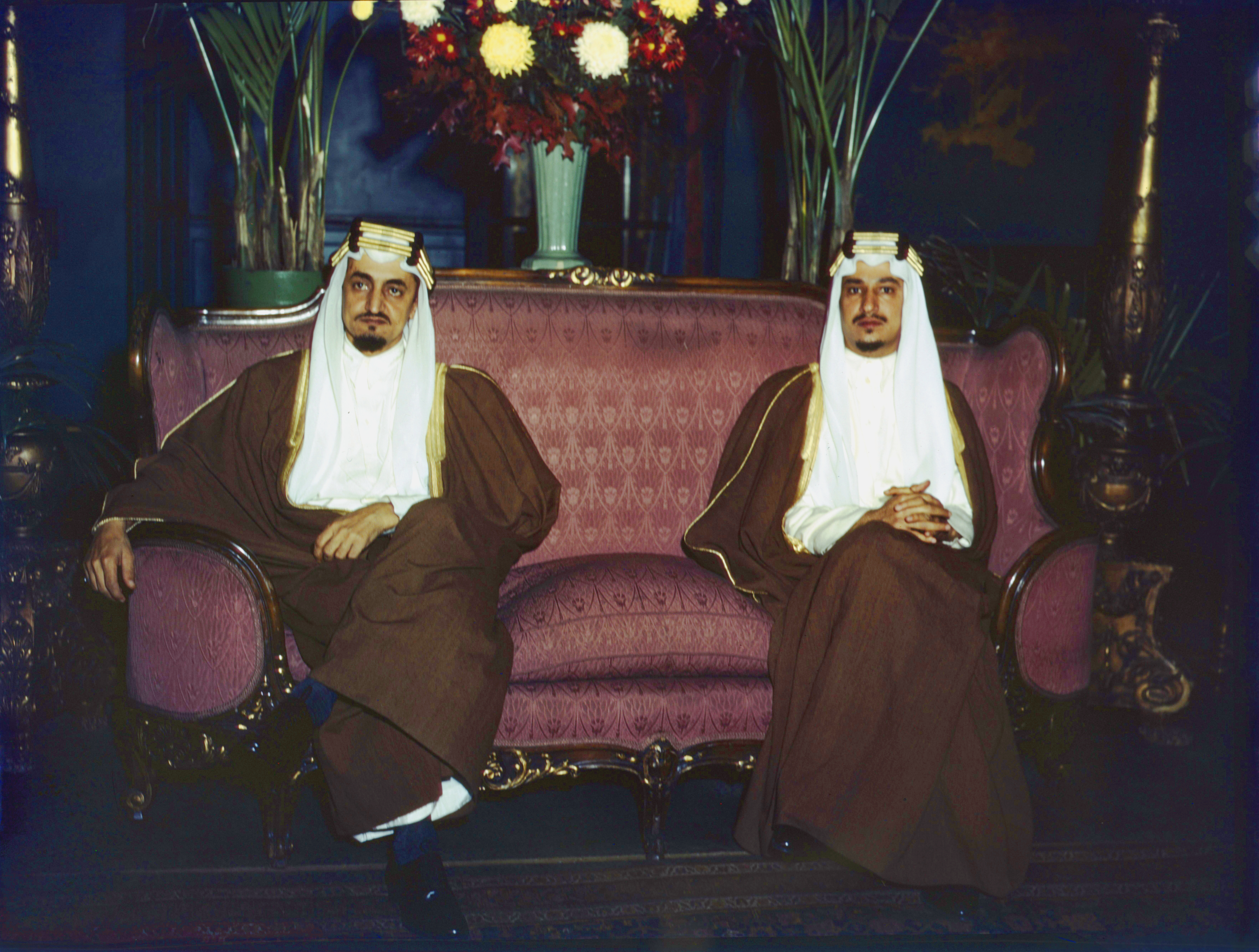
With Prince Khalid in Washington, D.C., 1943

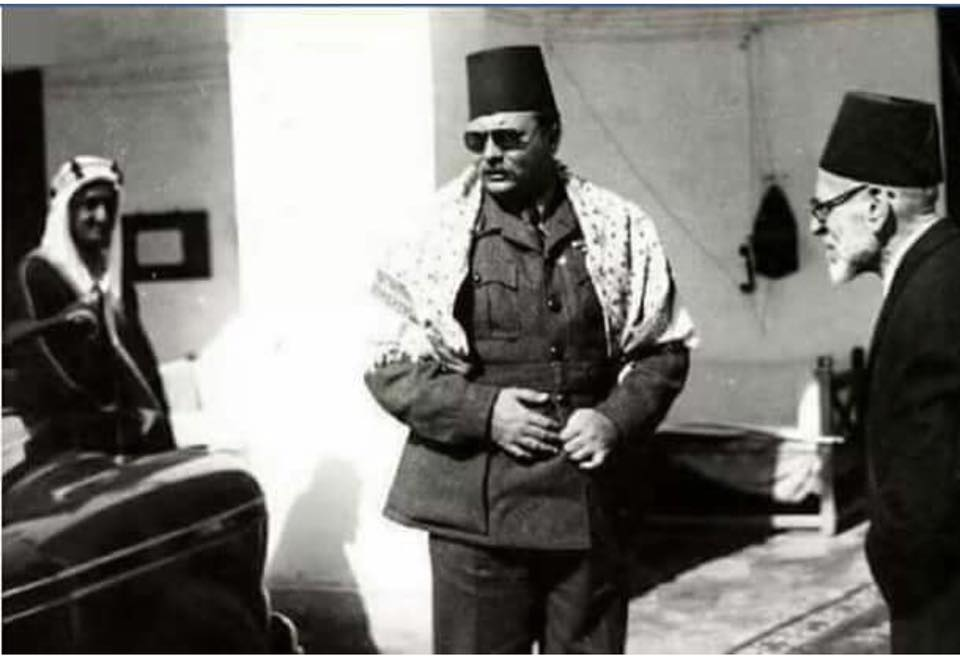
Faisal (left) meeting with King Farouk of Egypt at the Egyptian Tekkiyah at Medina during Farouk's visit to Saudi Arabia, 1945

Faisal visited several countries in this period, including Iran in May 1932, Poland in 1932 and Russia in 1933. On 8 July 1932 he visited Turkey and met with President Kemal Atatürk. On 23 September 1932, the prince officially announced the establishment of Saudi Arabia on behalf of his father from Al Hamidiyah Palace in Mecca by reading out the royal decree that renamed the Kingdom of Hejaz and Nejd as the Kingdom of Saudi Arabia. Faisal commanded a campaign during the Saudi–Yemeni War in 1934, resulting in a Saudi victory. He and his half-brother Khalid visited the US in October 1943 following the invitation of President Franklin D. Roosevelt. This is one of the early contacts between Saudi Arabia and the US.

As King Abdulaziz neared the end of his life, he favored Faisal as a possible successor over his eldest living son, Crown Prince Saud, due to Faisal's extensive knowledge, as well as his years of experience. Since Faisal was a child, Abdulaziz recognized him as the most brilliant of his sons and often tasked him with responsibilities in war and diplomacy. In addition, Faisal was known to embrace a simple Bedouin lifestyle. "I only wish I had three Faisals", Abdulaziz once said when discussing who would succeed him. However, Abdulaziz made the decision to keep Saud as crown prince in the fear that otherwise would lead to decreased stability.

== Crown prince and prime minister ==
King Abdulaziz died on 9 November 1953, and Prince Faisal was at his side. Faisal's elder half-brother, Saud, became king. Faisal was then appointed crown prince. On 16 August 1954 he was made prime minister.

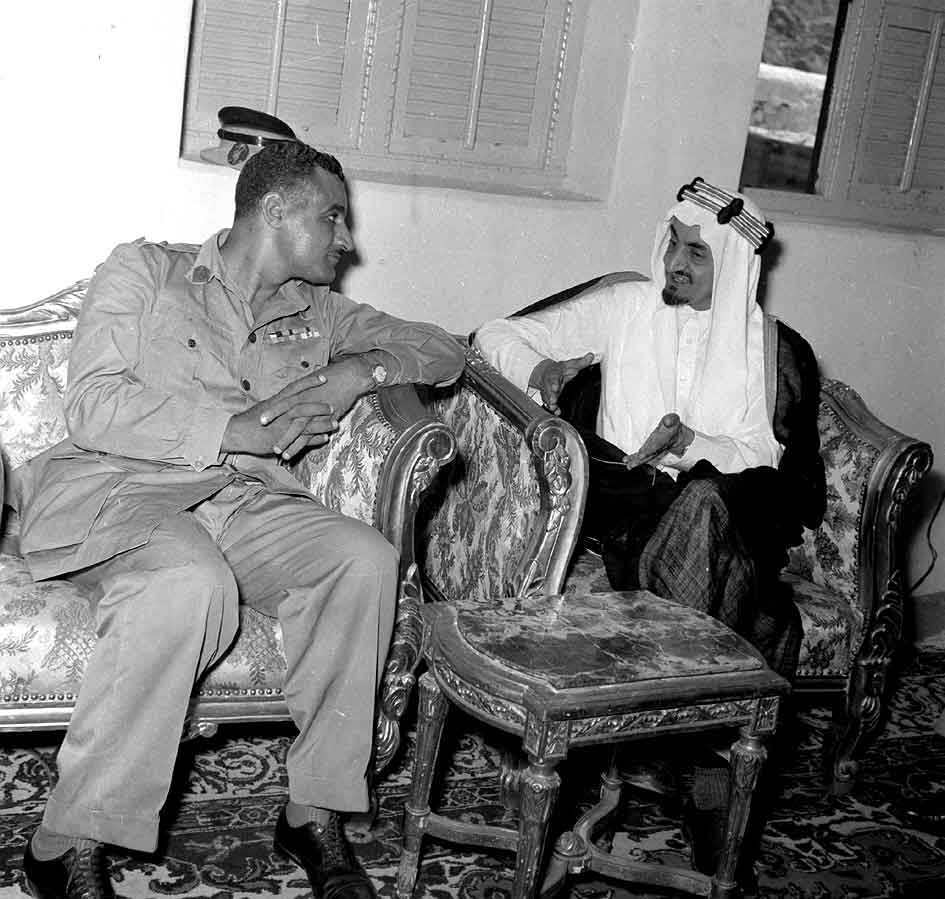
With Gamal Abdel Nasser in Hejaz, 1954

King Saud embarked on a spending program that included the construction of a massive royal residence on the outskirts of the capital, Riyadh. He also faced pressure from neighboring Egypt, where Gamal Abdel Nasser had overthrown the monarchy in 1952. Nasser was able to cultivate a group of dissident princes led by Prince Talal bin Abdulaziz, who defected to Egypt. Fearing that Saud's financial policies were bringing the state to the brink of collapse, and that his handling of foreign affairs was inept, senior members of the royal family and the ulema (religious leadership) pressured Saud into appointing Faisal to the position of prime minister in 1958, giving Faisal wide executive powers.

A power struggle ensued between Saud and Faisal, and on 18 December 1960, Faisal resigned as prime minister in protest, arguing that Saud was frustrating his financial reforms. Saud took back his executive powers and, having induced Prince Talal to return from Egypt, appointed him as minister of finance in July 1958. In 1962, however, Faisal rallied enough support within the royal family to install himself as prime minister for a second time. Less than a month before this event Faisal held a secret meeting with US president John F. Kennedy in Washington, D.C., on 4 October 1962. The same year, Faisal announced the Ten Point Program, which outlined Saudi Arabia's path to becoming an industrialized nation by implementing economic, financial, political, and legal principles. Among the highlights were:

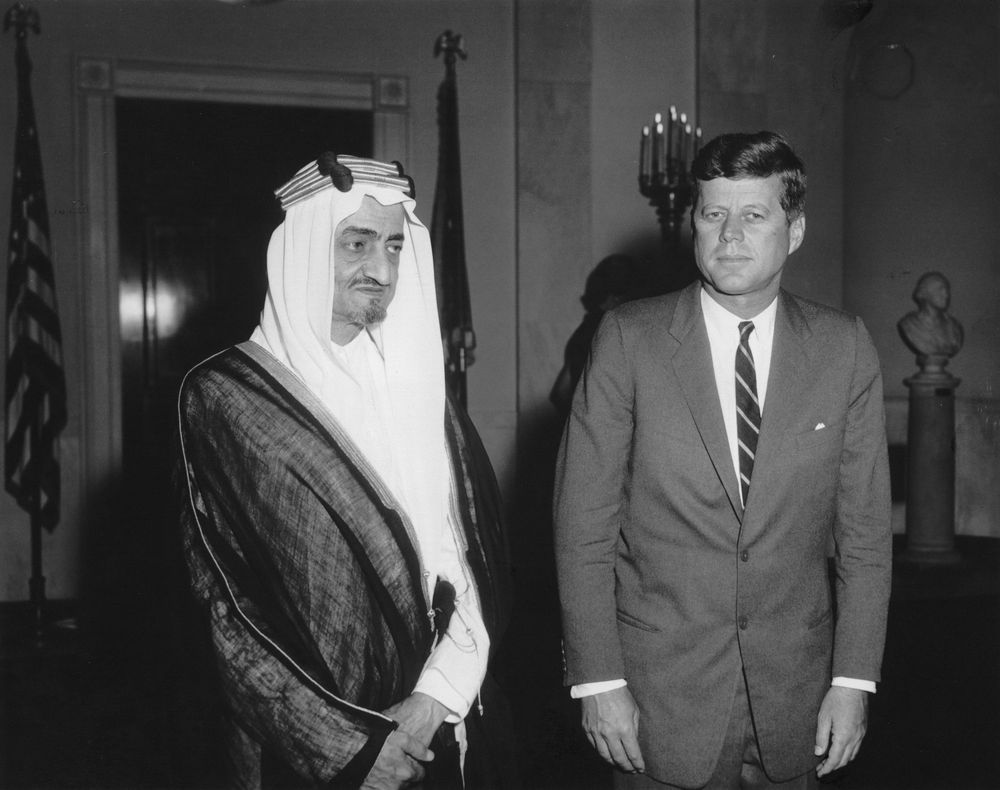
Meeting with President Kennedy, October 1962

- Issuing a basic system of governance derived from Islamic Sharia and developing the system of governance and the Saudi Arabian Council of Ministers.
- Establishing a system for the provinces, clarifying the method of local government, in the various regions of the Kingdom.
- Establishing a system for the independence of the judiciary, under the control of a Supreme Judicial Council, and establishing the Ministry of Justice.
- Establishing a Supreme Council for issuing fatwas, comprising twenty jurists.
- Improving the social level of the Saudi people, through free medical treatment, free education, and the exemption of many foodstuffs from customs duties. In addition, a social security system and a system to protect workers from unemployment were established.
- Establishing a program for economic recovery, strengthening the financial position of the Kingdom, developing a program to raise the standard of living of citizens, establishing a road network linking parts of the Kingdom and its cities, providing water sources for drinking and agriculture, and ensuring the protection of light and heavy national industries. This includes allocating all the additional sums that the government would receive from Aramco for its rights claimed by the companies for the past years, and harnessing them to serve development projects.
- Continuing to develop girls' education as well as the advancement of women.
- The liberation of slaves and the abolition of slavery, once and for all in Saudi Arabia.

Faisal founded the Economic Development Committee in 1958. He was instrumental in the establishment of the Islamic University of Madinah in 1961. In 1962 he helped found the Muslim World League, a worldwide charity to which the Saudi royal family has reportedly since donated more than a billion dollars. In 1963 he established the country's first television station, though actual broadcasts would not begin for another two years.

== Struggle with King Saud ==
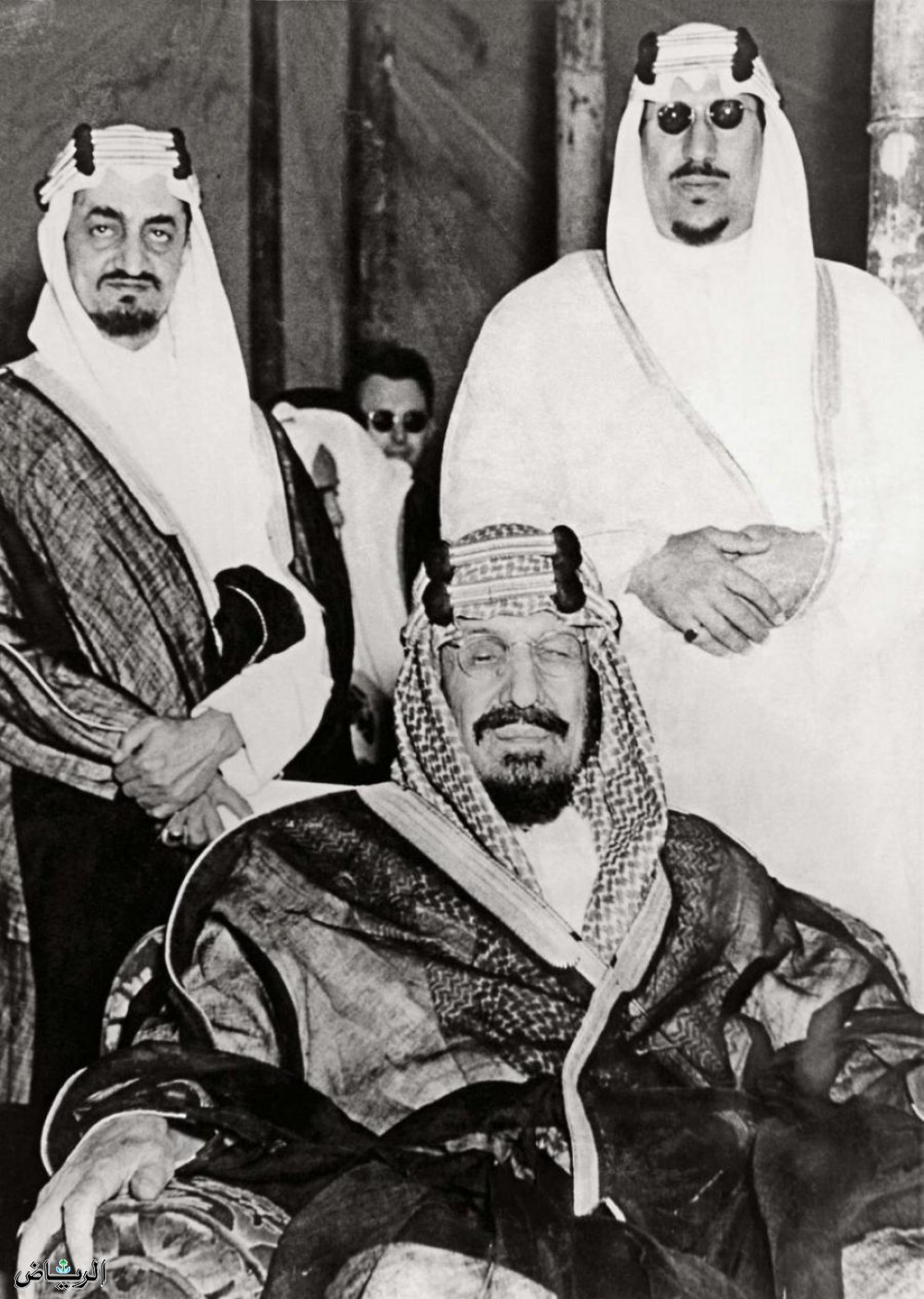
King Abdulaziz (seated) with his sons Faisal (left) and Saud, early 1950s. After their father died in 1953, a rivalry developed between Saud and Faisal that would culminate in Saud's removal from power.

During this period, the struggle with King Saud continued in the background, with the royal princes meeting and asking Faisal to take over effective control from Saud. Saud had driven the country into serious debt and embarrassed the royal family by becoming embroiled in a plan to assassinate United Arab Republic president Gamal Abdel Nasser.

Faisal took advantage of Saud's absence from the country for medical reasons in early 1963 to amass greater power for himself as Saudi Arabia's political and economic circumstances worsened. He removed many of Saud's loyalists from their posts and appointed like-minded princes in key military and security positions, such as his half-brother Prince Abdullah, to whom he gave command of the National Guard in 1962. Upon his return, Saud rejected Faisal's new arrangement and requested that all of his powers be restored.

In response, Faisal called a meeting of all senior members of the royal family, excluding Saud, as well as ulema and tribal elders. Faisal had convened the tribe chiefs in response to Saud's demand that his full powers be restored. As a result, the assembly supported Faisal and proposed that Saud be deposed from the throne and Faisal be proclaimed monarch. The Grand Mufti of Saudi Arabia, Muhammad ibn Ibrahim Al ash-Sheikh, a maternal cousin of Faisal, issued a fatwa (edict) calling on the King to accede to his brother's demands. Faisal, on the other hand, urged that Saud keep the royal title. He was said to have felt bound by his oath to his father that he would recognize Saud as king. All that mattered, he maintained, was that Saud leave power in Faisal's hands and stay out of public life.

As a last-ditch attempt to reclaim executive powers, Saud ordered the deployment of the Royal Guard at Nasriyah Palace, prompting Faisal to order the National Guard to surround Saud's palace. His loyalists outnumbered and outgunned, Saud relented, and on 4 March 1964, Faisal was appointed regent. A meeting of the elders of the royal family and the ulema was convened later that year, and the grand mufti decreed a second fatwa, calling on Saud to abdicate the throne in favor of his brother. Faisal believed that Saud's continued ill health compelled him to take the throne, thus absolving him of the oath. The royal family supported the fatwa and immediately informed Saud of their decision. Saud, by now shorn of all his powers, agreed, and Faisal was proclaimed king on 2 November 1964. Saud then went into exile, finding refuge in Egypt before eventually settling in Greece.

=== Abolition of slavery ===
Slavery did not vanish in Saudi Arabia until Faisal issued a decree for its total abolition in 1962. BBC presenter Peter Hobday stated that about 1,682 slaves were freed at that time, at a cost to the government of $2,000 each. The political analyst Bruce Riedel argued that the US began to raise the issue of slavery after the meeting between King Abdulaziz and US president Franklin D. Roosevelt in 1945, and that John F. Kennedy finally persuaded the House of Saud to abolish slavery in 1962.

== King of Saudi Arabia ==
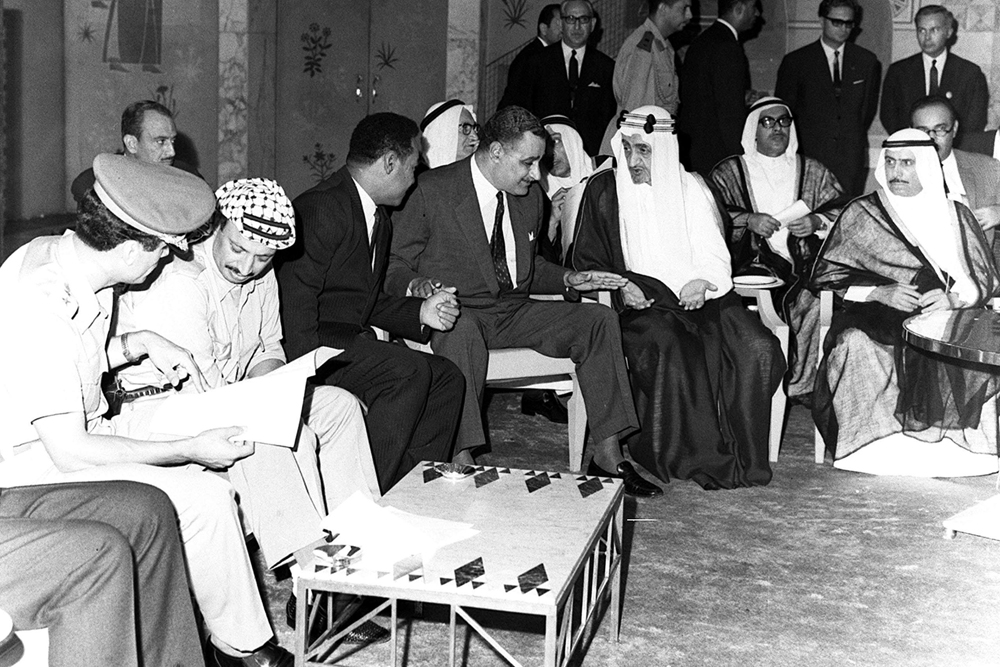
Arab leaders meet in Cairo, September 1970. From left to right: Muammar Gaddafi (Libya), Yasser Arafat (Palestine), Jaafar al-Nimeiri (Sudan), Gamal Abdel Nasser (Egypt), King Faisal (Saudi Arabia) and Sheikh Sabah (Kuwait)

In a speech shortly after becoming king, Faisal said:

I beg of you, brothers, to look upon me as both brother and servant. 'Majesty' is reserved to God alone and 'the throne' is the throne of the Heavens and Earth.

One of the earliest actions Faisal took as king was to establish a council to deal with future succession issues. The members were his uncles Abdullah and Musaid and his half-brothers Khalid, Fahd, Abdullah, Sultan, and Nawwaf. In 1967 Faisal established the post of second prime minister and appointed Prince Fahd to this post. The reason for this newly established body was Prince Khalid's request and suggestion. The use of Saudi Arabia's flag was made by him official on 15 March 1973, although it had been in use since 1902.

Faisal's most senior adviser during his reign was Rashad Pharaon, his father's private physician. Another adviser was Grand Mufti Muhammad ibn Ibrahim Al Sheikh, who was influential in shaping the King's political role in the Arab world.

=== Modernization ===
Early in his reign, Faisal required Saudi princes to educate their children inside the country rather than abroad; this also encouraged upper-class families to bring their sons back to study in the kingdom. He also introduced the current system of administrative regions, established the Ministry of Justice in 1970, and launched the kingdom’s first five-year plan for economic development.

During his reign, the Saudi government introduced new laws on media, publishing, and archiving, and concluded cultural cooperation agreements with foreign and corporate archives that held records on mid-twentieth-century Arabia. Television broadcasts officially began in 1965. In the same year, a nephew of Faisal attacked the newly established headquarters of Saudi television but was killed by security personnel. The attacker was the brother of Faisal's future assassin, and the incident is the most widely accepted motive for his assassination. Although there was some discontent with the social changes he carried out, the Arab world grew to respect Faisal as a result of his policies modernizing Saudi Arabia, his management of the holy cities of Mecca and Medina, his reputation as a staunch opponent of Zionism, and the country's fast-rising financial strength.

=== Economic development ===
Faisal sought to increase state use of oil revenue and reviewed Saudi Arabia’s profit-sharing arrangement with Aramco. During his reign, the government also moved away from some earlier oil exploitation arrangements and increasingly reserved oil investment concessions for state institutions. After a fiscal crisis in the treasury, his government expanded activity in industry, agriculture, finance, and public administration.

Faisal took charge of formulating the kingdom's five-year plans and began setting up the structure of administrative regions. His government used foreign consulting firms in planning and development projects and expanded work in industry, agriculture, land development, natural resource exploration, and water supply. Faisal also supported the growth of Petromin, the expansion of power infrastructure, and the development of petrochemical, iron, steel, cement, and mining projects. He also supported sending Saudi students abroad for study and training as part of the kingdom's broader development efforts. In 1969, the kingdom initiated its first development strategy. Faisal met U.S. President Lyndon B. Johnson in 1966 and President Richard Nixon in Washington in 1971. In 1973, Saudi Arabia and the United States established the Joint Saudi–American Economic Committee. In 1974, Nixon became the first U.S. president to visit Saudi Arabia.

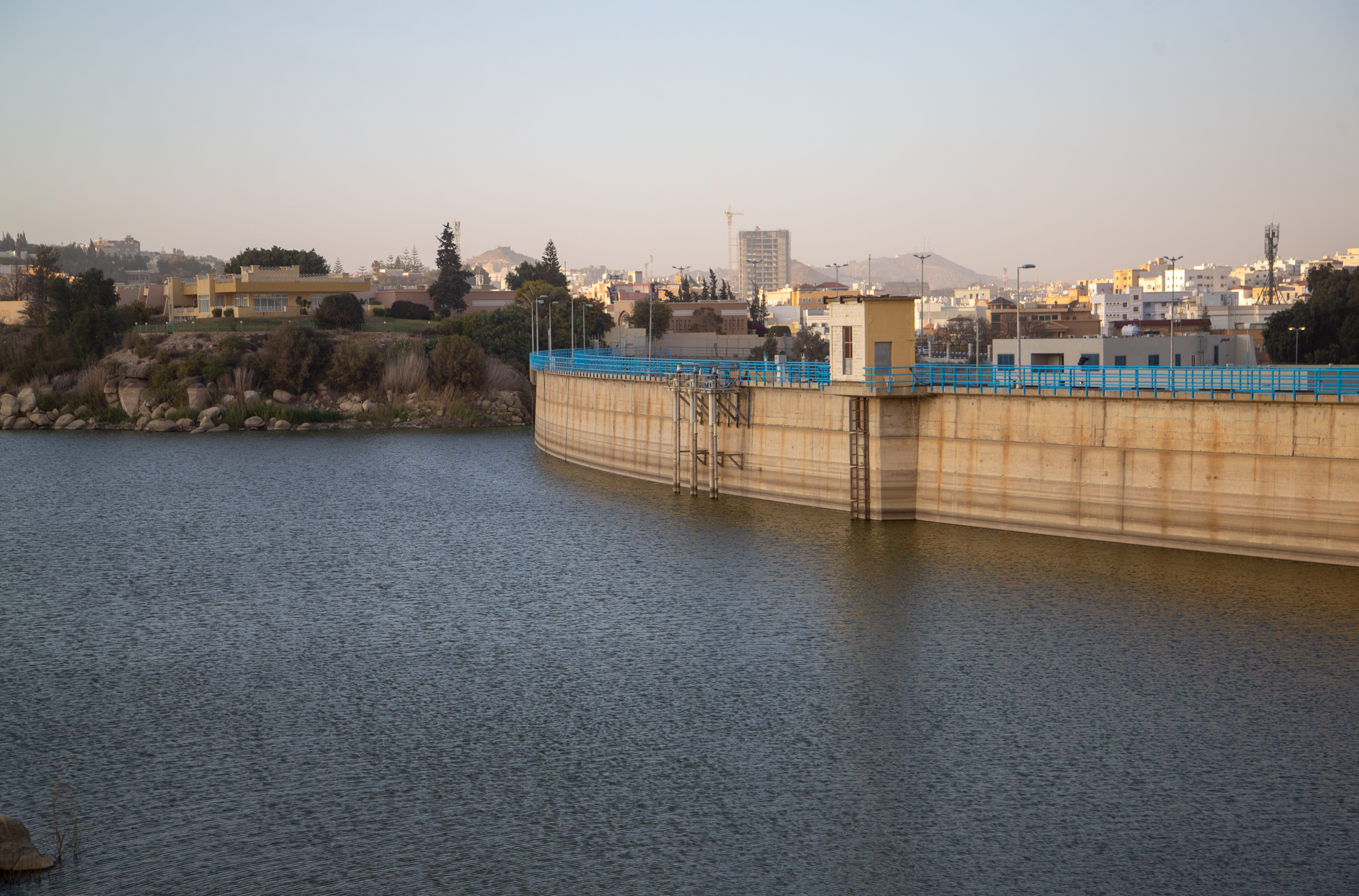
Abha Dam, completed in 1974

=== Agricultural development ===
In 1965, the Ministry of Agriculture worked with multinational consulting firms on a water exploration program. During this period, the ministry also pursued policies related to agriculture, livestock, fisheries, plant conservation, combating desertification, and guiding farmers in improving date production. It also encouraged private-sector investment in the packaging and preservation of dates. Projects during this period included the construction of the Jizan Dam in 1970 with the assistance of foreign companies. In Al-Ahsa, an irrigation and drainage project was carried out to conserve water from springs and wells and make use of surplus water. Dams were also built in Abha, Al-Majma'ah, and along Wadi Hanifa near Riyadh to collect rainwater. Agricultural projects were launched in Tabuk Province, Al-Jawf Province, Wadi Sirhan, Al-Qassim Province, Al Aflaj Governorate, Wadi Bisha, and Najran Province. The government also directed the Agricultural Bank to provide farmers and fishermen with long-term, interest-free loans for equipment purchases.

=== Transportation development ===
During Faisal’s reign, Saudi Arabia expanded its road network and improved links with neighboring countries including Jordan, Syria, Iraq, and Kuwait. His government also developed agricultural roads to help villages and farmers transport their products to market. In aviation, airports were expanded and upgraded, and Saudi Arabian Airlines acquired jet aircraft. A civil aviation training institute was established in Jeddah. Port facilities also expanded during this period, including the enlargement of the Jeddah Islamic Port and the establishment of ports in Yanbu and Jazan.

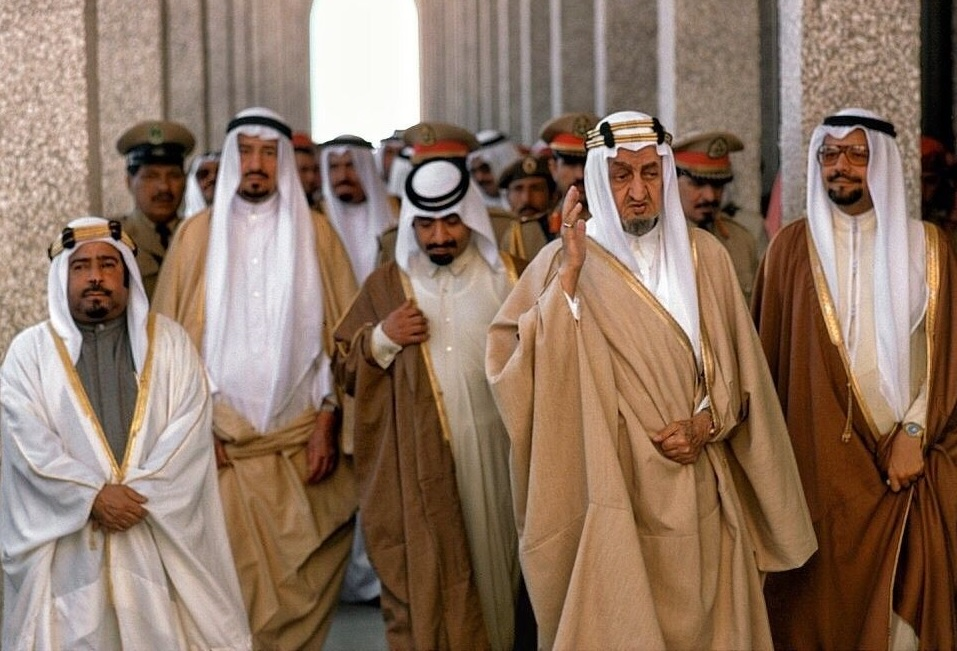
Faisal inaugurating the College of Petroleum and Minerals in 1974

=== Education development ===
Education expanded during Faisal's reign through curriculum reform, the growth of foreign educational missions, and financial support for students from low-income families. He also supported sending Saudi students abroad for study and training. Textbooks were distributed free of charge. In 1974, Faisal ordered the establishment of Imam Muhammad bin Saud Islamic University in Riyadh. In 1967, he established King Abdulaziz University in Jeddah. In 1974, he ordered the Council of Ministers to merge the university into the state system as a public university offering free education to Saudi students. In 1975, the College of Petroleum and Minerals in Dhahran was converted into the King Fahd University of Petroleum and Minerals. King Faisal University was also established in Al-Ahsa in 1975 and was inaugurated during the reign of his brother Khalid in 1977.

Faisal played an important role in the expansion of women's education in Saudi Arabia, beginning during his time as crown prince. In 1956, he established Dar Al Hanan, described as the first regular government school for girls in the country, under the patronage of his wife Iffat. In 1960, a royal order issued during the reign of King Saud established the General Presidency for Girls Education, marking an early stage in the formal development of women's education in Saudi Arabia.

=== Health development ===
During Faisal's reign, Saudi Arabia recruited doctors and nursing staff from abroad and expanded state health programs. Faisal ordered the establishment of the King Faisal Specialist Hospital in Riyadh on land that he donated, and the hospital began operations in 1975. His government also worked with the World Health Organization to develop health programs. State spending on healthcare also increased during this period. Healthcare funding reached 3.4% of the budget, and the budget for public health and social affairs amounted to 591 million riyals in 1973. Health planning also formed part of the kingdom's five-year plan for 1970 to 1975. During these years, the number of doctors rose to 1,020, health assistants to 3,750, hospital beds increased by 30%, dispensaries by 60%, and health centers to 200.

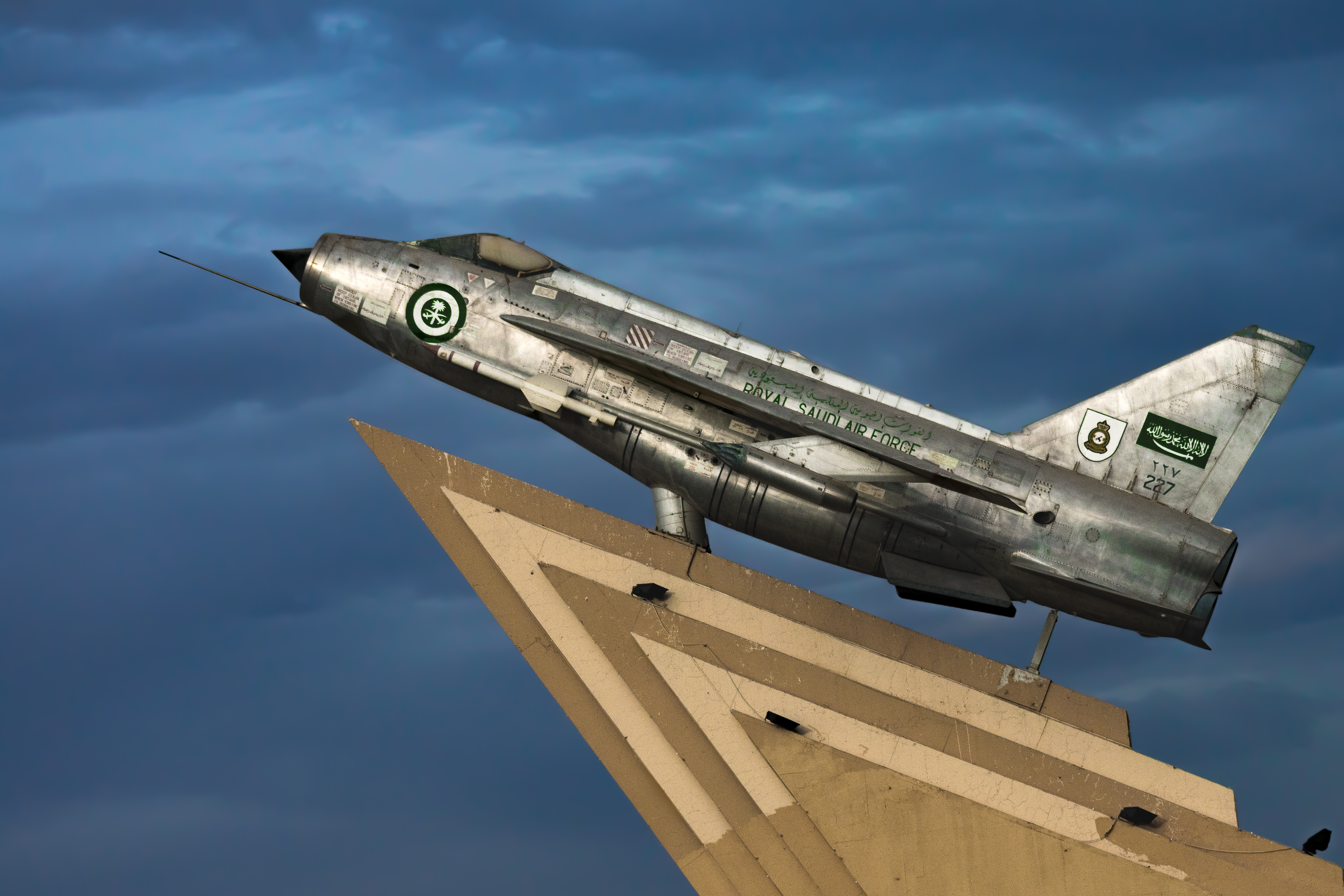
A Saudi Arabian Lightning fighter on display at the gates of King Faisal Air Base in Tabuk, Saudi Arabia

=== Military development ===
During Faisal's reign, Saudi Arabia expanded the Royal Saudi Air Force and established new military training institutions. The King Faisal Air Academy was announced in 1967 and began operations in 1970.

In December 1965, Faisal ordered forty Lightning aircraft, including 34 single-seat and 6 two-seat models. Deliveries began on 1 July 1968, when the first two aircraft flew from Wharton to Jeddah. The aircraft remained in service until January 1986.

In 1972, Faisal also ordered 39 Mirage 5 aircraft from France. After their arrival in the kingdom in 1974, he donated them to the Egyptian Air Force before they entered Royal Saudi Air Force service.

==== Military cities ====
During Faisal's reign, Saudi Arabia established new military cities that included bases, training and firing grounds, ammunition and equipment storage facilities, and residential areas with educational, medical, recreational, and commercial services. These cities also included gardens, green spaces, and sports clubs. King Faisal Military City was established in 1971 near Khamis Mushait. King Abdulaziz Military City in the northwestern region was inaugurated by Faisal in 1973.

=== Steps against coups d'état ===
The 1950s and 1960s saw numerous coups d'état in the region. Muammar Gaddafi's coup that overthrew the monarchy in oil-rich Libya in 1969 was especially threatening for Saudi Arabia due to the similarity between the two sparsely populated desert countries. As a result, Faisal undertook to build a sophisticated security apparatus and cracked down firmly on dissent. As in all affairs, he justified these policies in Islamic terms. Early in his reign, when faced with demands for a written constitution for the country, Faisal responded that "our constitution is the Qur'an". In the summer of 1969 he ordered the arrest of hundreds of military officers, including some generals, alleging that a military coup d'état was being planned. The coup was planned primarily by air force officers and aimed at overthrowing the monarchy and founding a Nasserist regime in the country. King Faisal claimed that Sami Sharaf, one of the Gamal Abdel Nasser's officials, was the planner of the plot. The arrests were possibly based on a tip from American intelligence.

=== Religious inclusiveness ===
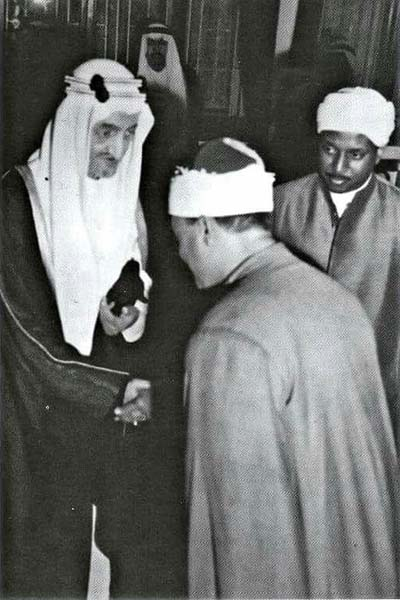
With Egyptian imam and Quran reciter Abdul Basit 'Abd us-Samad, early 1970s

Faisal seemed to hold the pluralist view, favouring limited, cautious accommodation of popular demands for inclusive reform, and made repeated attempts to broaden political representation, harking back to his temporarily successful national integration policy from 1965 to 1975. The King acknowledged his country's religious and cultural diversity, which includes the predominantly Shia Al Ahsa in the east; the Asir in the southwest, with tribal affinities to Yemen, especially among the Ismaili tribes of Najran and Jizan; and the Kingdom of the Hejaz, with its capital Mecca. He included non-Wahhabi, cosmopolitan Sunni Hejazis from Mecca and Jeddah in the Saudi government. It was said that he would not take any decision regarding Mecca without seeking the advice of Sunni (Sufi) scholar al-Sayyid 'Alawi ibn 'Abbas al-Maliki al-Hasani, the father of Muhammad ibn 'Alawi al-Maliki. Similarly in 1962, in promoting a broader, non-sectarian form of pan-Islamism, Faisal launched the Muslim World League where the Tijani Sufi scholar Ibrahim Niass was invited. Furthermore, he countered the outlook of certain prior Saudi rulers in declaring to the Saudi state clergy that, "All Muslims, from Egypt, India etc. are your brothers". However Mai Yamani argued that after his reign, discrimination based on sect, tribe, region, and gender became the order of the day and has remained as such until today.

The role and authority of the state clergy declined after Faisal became king in 1964, even though they had helped bring him to the throne. Despite his piety and biological relationship through his mother to the Al as Shaykh family, and his support for the pan-Islamic movement in his struggle against pan-Arabism, he decreased the ulema's power and influence. Unlike his successor Khalid, Faisal attempted to prevent radical clerics from controlling religious institutions such as the Council of Senior Ulema, the highest religious institution in Saudi Arabia, or taking religious offices such as Grand Mufti, responsible for preserving Islamic law. But his advisers warned that, once religious zealots had been motivated, disastrous effects would result.

Due to his status as a pious Muslim, Faisal was able to implement careful social reforms such as female education. Despite this, religious conservatives staged large protests. By holding talks with the conservatives, he was able to persuade them of the importance of progress in the coming years by using their own logic.

Corruption in the royal family was taken very seriously by religious figures in the Islamic theological colleges. They challenged some of the accepted theological interpretations adopted by the Saudi regime. One such influential figure was Sheikh Abdulaziz Bin Baz, then rector of the Al Medina college of theology (later he would serve as the country's grand mufti). Faisal would not tolerate his criticism and had him removed from his position. However, the teachings of Bin Baz had already radicalized some of his students, one of which was Juhayman al-Otaybi.

=== Interest in holy sites ===
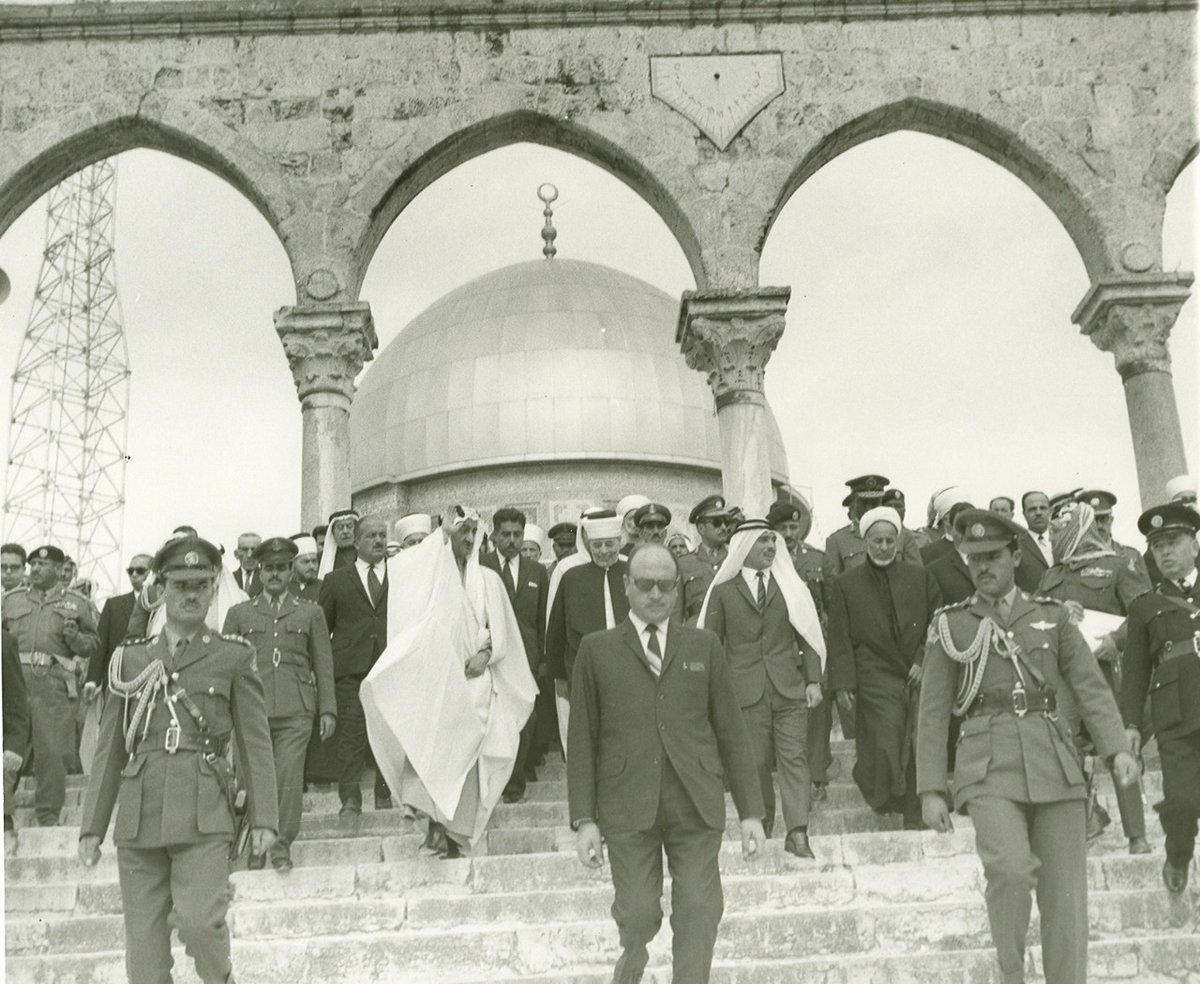
Visiting Palestine in 1966. During this time, he prayed in Al Aqsa Mosque.

The Saudi Binladin Group was tasked with expanding Masjid al-Haram, which would be the first substantial enlargement in a thousand years. This massive project began in 1955, during the reign of King Saud, and continued for twenty years during the reigns of King Faisal and King Khalid. In 1967, a conference in Mecca brought together a significant number of Muslim architects to discuss possible design alternatives. Faisal objected to the conference's recommendation to demolish a significant portion of the Ottoman structure, arguing that the Ottoman structure should be preserved and new architectural designs created using the best methods of convergence. A new phase of construction began in 1969 with the addition of two new wings and repairs to the sanctuary's existing structure. During this phase, the surrounding roadways were developed and the squares were installed. At the time, the project cost approximately 800 million Saudi riyals. In 1962, he also ordered the reopening of the Kaaba Cloth Factory in Mecca due to political tensions between Egypt (then called the United Arab Republic) and Saudi Arabia.

The Muslim World League planned to renovate Maqam Ibrahim in 1965, with the maqam housed inside a crystal pillar with a silver lid. Faisal agreed and issued an order putting the plan in motion. Buildings were demolished to make the circumambulation rituals easier. By 1967, the area around Maqam Ibrahim had grown, and crowds were able to perform the circumambulation rituals in comfort and ease.

In the case of the Prophet's Mosque, Faisal gave an order to construct prayer areas to the west of the mosque following the completion of the first Saudi expansion, which opened in 1955 and due to an increase in the number of pilgrims. It was built in 1973 and stood until the second Saudi expansion, when it was decommissioned. The Saudi Binladin Group was also sent to East Jerusalem in 1964 to perform restoration work on the Dome of the Rock.

== Foreign policy ==
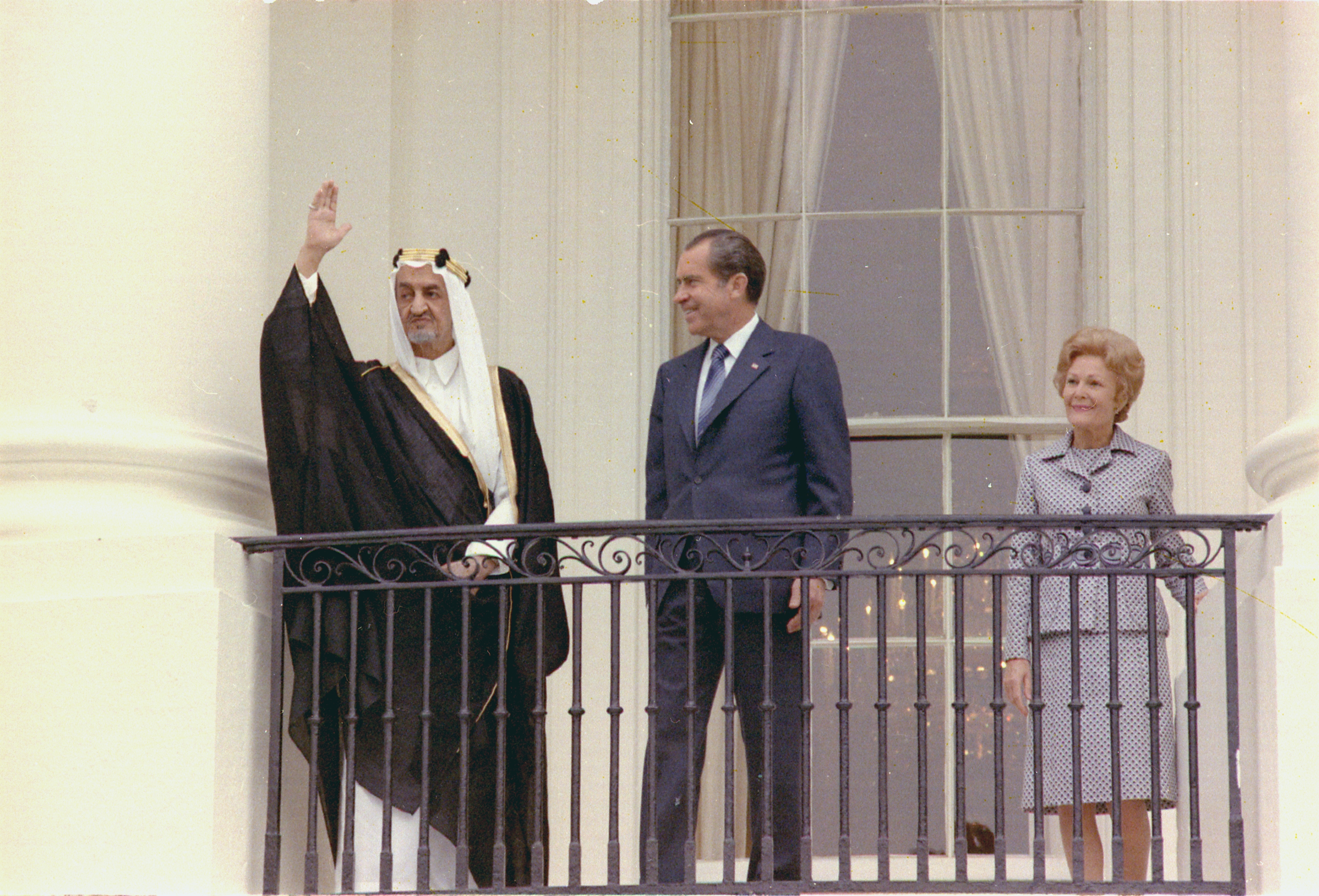
Meeting US president Richard Nixon and his wife Pat Nixon in Washington, D.C., 27 May 1971

As king, Faisal employed Islam as one of Saudi Arabia's foreign policy tools which differentiated him from King Abdulaziz and King Saud. However, he continued the close alliance with the United States begun by King Abdulaziz, and relied on the US heavily for arming and training his armed forces. Faisal's first official visit as king to the US was in June 1966.

Faisal was anti-communist. He refused any political ties with the Soviet Union and other Communist bloc countries, professing to see a complete incompatibility between communism and Islam. He signed an agreement with Abdel-Halim Mahmoud, the Egyptian Grand Imam of al-Azhar, to combat Communism in 1971 during the presidency of Anwar Sadat. The agreement had a budget of 40 million pounds.

Faisal is said to have reminded the Shah of Iran, Mohammad Reza Pahlavi, in a correspondence that he was not "the Shah of France" and that he should keep in mind that Iran was a majority Muslim country. This was in response to a provocative letter from Mohammad Reza asking Faisal to modernise Saudi Arabia, urging him to allow women to wear miniskirts and permitting the disco among other things. Otherwise, the Shah felt, he could not guarantee that the King would stay on the throne.

=== Palestinian cause ===
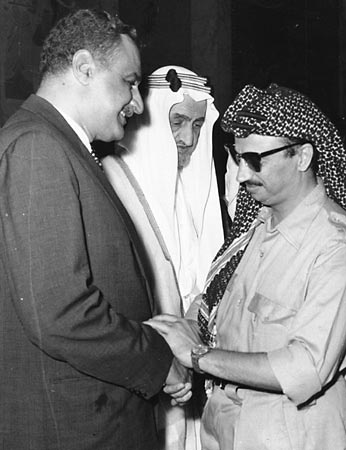
With Egyptian president Gamal Abdel Nasser (left) and Palestinian leader Yasser Arafat (right) at the 1970 Arab League summit

After he became foreign minister, Prince Faisal was recognized for his support for the Palestinian cause. His involvement with the Palestinian cause began in 1938, when he represented his father in the London Conference on the Palestine issue, where he delivered an important address opposing the partition plan. He wrote a message to the Saudi people in 1948 in which he discussed the Palestinian struggle and the suffering of the Palestinian people.

The Saudi delegation was led by Faisal and his brother Khalid at the St. James Palace Conference, which Britain called for, inviting representatives of the Arabs of Palestine, neighboring Arab states, and the Jewish Agency to consult with the British government in London on the partition of Palestine. The conference began on 7 February 1939 and ended on 17 March 1939, at St. James's Palace in London. In light of the Woodhead Commission's report, both the Arabs and the British government rejected the partition plan as impractical. The British government issued a policy statement rejecting partition as impracticable due to "political, administrative, and financial difficulties." The conference was also unable to resolve the issue of Jewish immigration to Palestine, which had become more common following Nazi Germany's annexation of all of Czechoslovakia.

Faisal was a global advocate for Palestinian rights, as evidenced by one of his speeches to the United Nations in 1963, in which he claimed that the Palestinian crisis is the only thing that has ruined Arab peace since the UN resolution to partition Palestine. One of his policies on this issue was to refuse to recognize Israel, to unite Arab efforts while leaving differences aside, to donate money and fight, to establish a body representing Palestinians, and to involve Muslims in the defense of the cause.

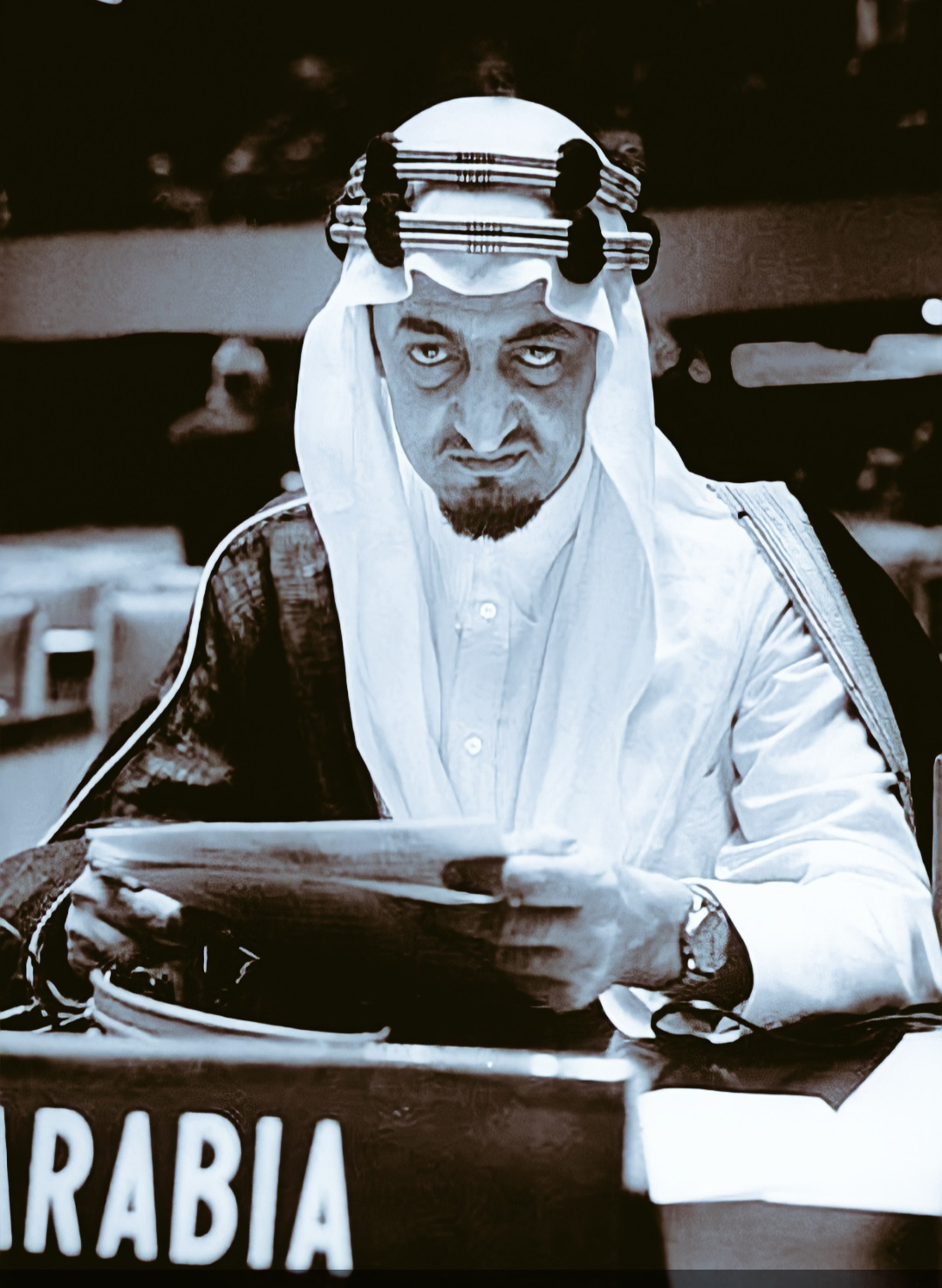
Faisal sits at his table at a meeting at the United Nations during his tenure as Minister of Foreign Affairs

In his speech on 22 September 1947 to the United Nations, Faisal said:

But today the Arabs wish to repel the aggression of a political minority group, namely, the Zionists. It is a group which does not represent world Jewry. It is a group which is more political than religious, a group whose ways and methods are not different from those of the Nazis.

==== Arson attack on Al-Aqsa Mosque ====
Between 23 and 25 September 1969, Faisal convened a conference in Rabat, Morocco, to discuss the arson attack on the Al Aqsa Mosque that had occurred a month earlier. The leaders of 25 Muslim states attended and the conference called for Israel to give up territory conquered in 1967. The conference also set up the Organisation of Islamic Cooperation and pledged its support for the Palestinians.

=== North Yemen Civil War ===
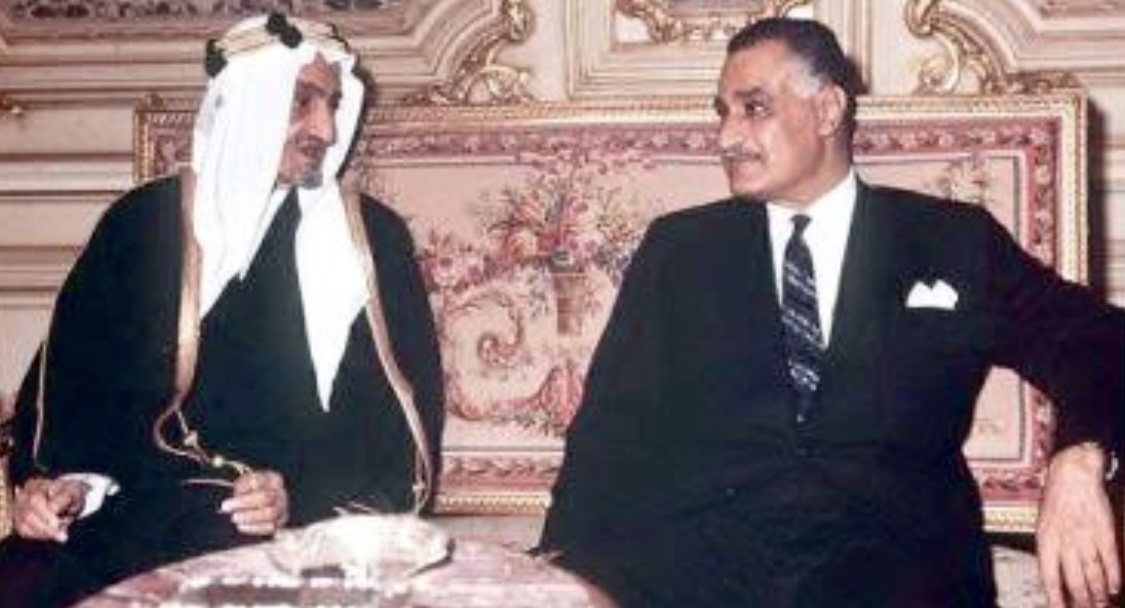
With Egyptian president Gamal Abdel Nasser in a meeting at Qubbah Palace in Cairo, 18 December 1969

The North Yemen Civil War raged between loyalists of the Mutawakkilite Kingdom of Yemen and those of the Yemen Arab Republic from 1962 to 1970. The Yemeni republic was created after revolutionary republicans headed by the army under Abdullah al-Sallal staged a coup against Imam Muhammad al-Badr. As a result, the Imam fled to the Saudi Arabia–Yemen border, where he rallied backing from northern Shia tribes to reclaim control, sparking a full-fledged civil war. Saudi Arabia backed al-Badr and his royalist followers, while Egypt under the United Arab Republic backed the Yemeni republicans. As a result, Saudi and Egyptian relations were strained.

In September 1964, Nasser and Faisal met in Alexandria, Egypt, at the Arab summit. At the time, Egypt had 40,000 troops in Yemen, with 10,000 civilians killed. The two leaders committed in their formal declaration to completely cooperate in resolving current disagreements between Yemen's diverse factions, collaborate in preventing armed clashes in Yemen, and to reach a peaceful conclusion. The declaration was widely praised in the Arab world, and Washington praised it as a "statesmanlike action" and a "major step toward eventual peaceful resolution of the long civil war." At Alexandria's airport, Nasser and Faisal exchanged heartfelt embraces and referred to each other as "brother." Faisal said he was leaving Egypt "with my heart brimming with love for President Nasser."

Gamal Abdel Nasser traveled to Jeddah on the Freedom ship in August 1965, marking his first visit to Saudi Arabia since 1954, when he came to perform Hajj. Faisal greeted Nasser warmly when he arrived. Despite their differences, the two countries' relations were restored. Both men came to an agreement on the following (known as the Jeddah Agreement) within 48 hours:

- The gradual withdrawal of Egyptian forces from Yemen within ten months
- The cessation of all Saudi aid to the royalists
- The formation of a Yemeni council of 50 members representing all Yemeni factions and charged with forming a transitional government in preparation for a general referendum to determine the future of Yemen

Sami Sharaf, an Egyptian official, recognized that implementing the agreement would be difficult because it had been rejected by all Yemeni parties. Republican chairman Abdullah al-Sallal stated, "The agreement is a blatant interference in the independence of the Yemen Arab Republic, and a blatant attack on its sovereignty for all International laws." The royalists, on the other hand, backed the agreement at first before rejecting any attempt to terminate the war with the republicans.

The Haradh conference was conducted on November 23, 1965, under the auspices of Egypt and Saudi Arabia, to put the Saudi-Egyptian declaration between the two parties of the Yemeni conflict into effect. Judge Abd al-Rahman al-Iryani led the republican delegation, while Ahmed Muhammad al-Shami, the royalists' foreign minister, led the royal delegation. The conflicting parties, however, were unable to strike a compromise, which resulted in further bloodshed between republicans and royalists.

Egypt indicated its willingness to stop the war in Yemen as part of the Khartoum Resolution of August 1967. Egyptian Foreign Minister Mahmoud Riad suggested that Egypt and Saudi Arabia renew their 1965 Jeddah Agreement. Faisal was pleased with Nasser's offer, and Imam al-Badr pledged to deploy his troops to fight alongside Egypt against Israel if Nasser kept his word. Nasser and Faisal signed a deal in which Nasser agreed to withdraw his 20,000 troops from Yemen, Faisal agreed to stop delivering weapons to al-Badr, and three neutral Arab states agreed to send in observers. Al-Sallal felt that Nasser had betrayed him. Nasser unfroze approximately $100 million in Saudi assets in Egypt, and Faisal denationalized two Egyptian-owned banks he had taken over earlier that year. Saudi Arabia, Libya, and Kuwait agreed to give Egypt a $266 million annual subsidy, with Saudi Arabia contributing $154 million.

=== Six-Day War ===
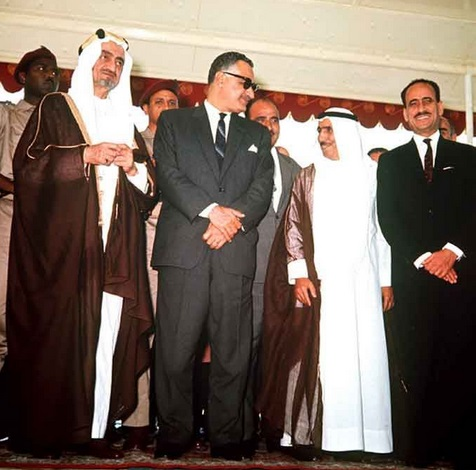
Some of the attending heads of state at the Arab League Summit in Khartoum following the Six-Day War. From left to right: Faisal, Gamal Abdel Nasser of Egypt, Abdullah al-Sallal of Yemen, Sabah Al-Salim Al-Sabah of Kuwait and Abd al-Rahman Arif of Iraq, 2 September 1967

During the Six-Day War, Faisal ordered the Saudi Arabian Armed Forces to be on alert, canceling all vacations and mobilizing forces in the Kingdom's north. Following that, orders were issued for a force of 20,000 Saudi soldiers to travel to Jordan to participate alongside the Arab forces. After the war, he directed that a Saudi force be stationed inside Jordanian territory to provide support and assistance as needed for ten years.

Furthermore, at the Khartoum Conference, Saudi Arabia, Libya, and Kuwait agreed to establish a fund worth $378 million to be distributed among countries affected by the June 1967 War. Saudi Arabia would contribute $140 million. However, Faisal did not attend himself and did not send a representative to the Arab League summits until 1969 to keep away from the requests of the Arab countries involved in the war concerning the increase of Saudi Arabia's financial aid.

Faisal's grandson, Prince Amr bin Mohammed Al Faisal, said "I am told by my relatives, my other relatives, after 1967 and the fall of Jerusalem to the Israelis, that was a turning point in his life. He never smiled again, according to them. I didn't see him smile much, and he became very quiet and contemplative, and mostly he would spend his time listening rather than speaking himself."

=== Ramadan War ===
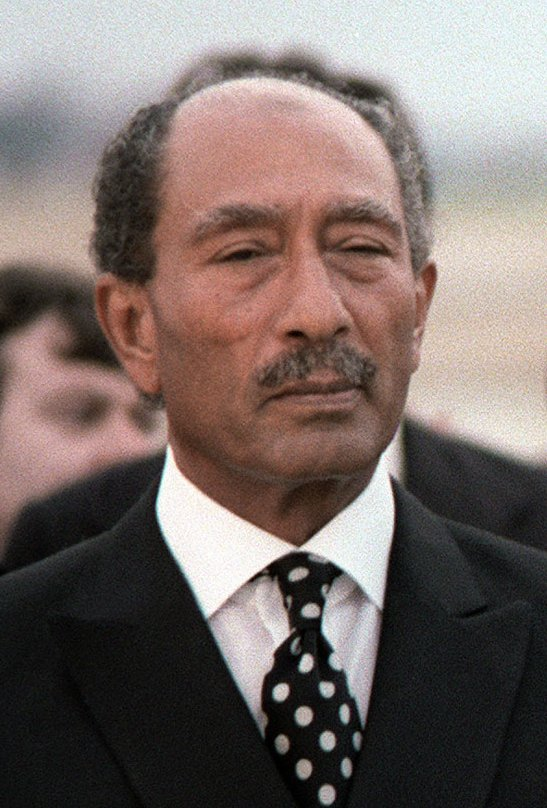
After taking office in 1970, Egyptian president Anwar Sadat formed a strong diplomatic relationship with Faisal.

After President Nasser of Egypt died in 1970, Faisal drew closer to Nasser's successor, Anwar Sadat, who himself was planning a break with the Soviet Union and a move towards the pro-American camp. After Sadat launched the 1973 Arab–Israeli War, Faisal withdrew Saudi oil from world markets and was the primary force behind the 1973 oil crisis, in protest over Western support for Israel during the conflict. The embargo was initially imposed on Canada, Japan, the Netherlands, the United Kingdom, and the United States, but it was later extended to Portugal, Rhodesia, and South Africa. The price of oil had risen about 300 percent by the conclusion of the embargo in March 1974, from US$3 per barrel ($19/m^{3}) to nearly $12 per barrel ($75/m^{3}) globally; US prices were much higher. The embargo triggered an oil crisis, or "shock", with numerous short- and long-term implications for world politics and the economy. This was regarded as the defining act of Faisal's career, and gained him lasting prestige among many Arabs and Muslims worldwide.

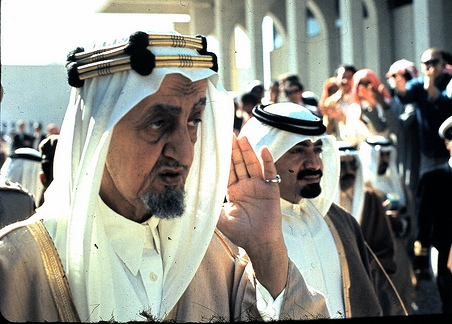
Saluting Saudi military personnel, 1974

In 1974 Faisal was named Time magazine's Man of the Year, and the financial windfall generated by the crisis fueled the economic boom that occurred in Saudi Arabia after his death. The new oil revenue also allowed Faisal to greatly increase the aid and subsidies begun following the 1967 Six-Day War to Egypt, Syria, and the Palestine Liberation Organization.

It is a commonly held belief in Saudi Arabia, and the wider Arab world, that Faisal's oil embargo was the real cause of his assassination, via a Western conspiracy.

== Personal life ==
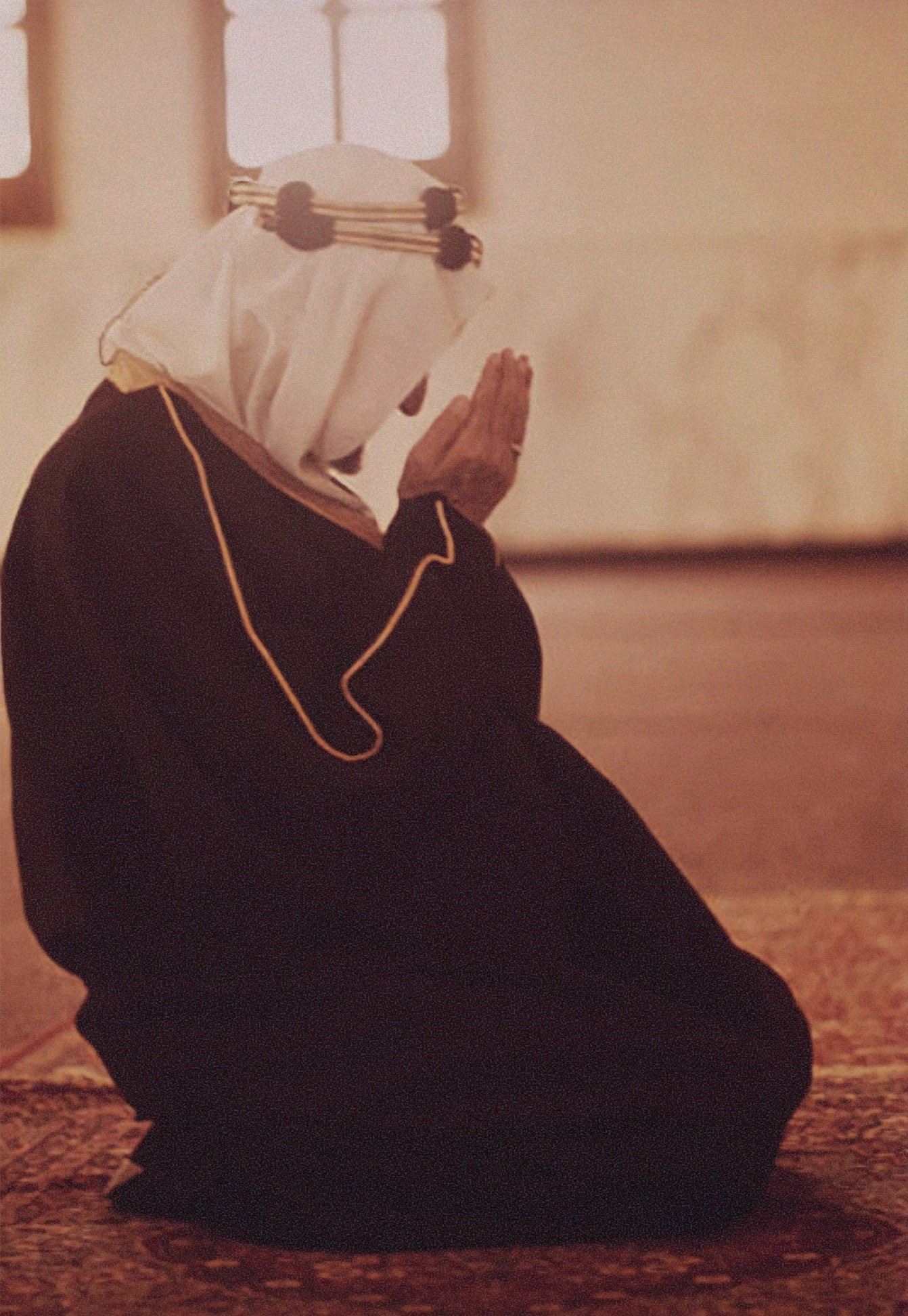
Making dua'a at a mosque, 1957

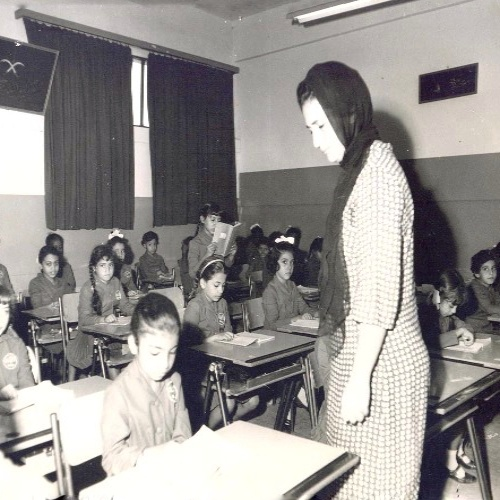
Queen Iffat visiting a school, 1960s

Faisal married many times concurrently. His spouses were from powerful families: Al Kabir, Al Sudairi, Al Jiluwi and Al Thunayan. His wives were:

- Sultana bint Ahmed Al Sudairi, the mother of his eldest son Prince Abdullah, whom Faisal fathered when he was between 15 and 17. Sultana was from the Sudairi family and the younger sister of Hassa bint Ahmed, the mother of the Sudairi brothers.
- Iffat bint Mohammad Al Thunayan (1916–2000), who was born and raised in Turkey. Her ancestors were part of the Al Thunayan branch of the Al Saud family. They first met in Istanbul around 1932 while he was in Turkey for an official visit. They had nine children, including Prince Mohammed, Prince Saud, and Prince Turki. Iffat was credited with being the influence behind many of her husband's reforms, particularly with regard to women. Faisal also raised Iffat's younger half-brother, Kamal Adham. The King later appointed Kamal as the first president of the Saudi intelligence agency, Al Mukhabarat Al A'amah. He was also an advisor to his royal brother-in-law.
- Al Jawhara bint Saud Al Kabir, the daughter of his aunt Noura bint Abdul Rahman and Saud Al Kabir bin Abdulaziz Al Saud. They married in October 1935. With Al Jawhara, Faisal had one daughter, Mashail (died October 2011).
- Haya bint Turki bin Abdulaziz Al Turki, the mother of Princess Noura, Prince Saad and Prince Khalid. She was a member of the Al Jiluwi clan. Princess Noura bint Faisal died on 13 March 2022.
- Hessa bint Muhammad bin Abdullah Al Muhanna Aba Al Khail, the mother of Princess Al Anoud (died June 2011) and Princess Al Jawhara (died April 2014).
- Munira bint Suhaim bin Hitimi Al Thunayan Al Mahasher, the mother of Princess Hessa (died in December 2020).
- Fatima bint Abdulaziz bin Mushait Al Shahrani, the mother of Princess Munira (died young).

Faisal's children were well educated and had prominent roles in Saudi society and government. His daughters were educated abroad and they went on to graduate from a variety of schools and universities around the world. His sons were likewise educated abroad. Comparatively, only six of the 108 children of King Saud graduated from high school. Faisal's son Turki received formal education at prestigious schools in New Jersey, and he later attended Georgetown University, while another son, Saud, was an alumnus of Princeton University. Faisal's sons held important positions in the Saudi government. His eldest son, Abdullah, held governmental positions for a while. Faisal's son Khalid was the governor of Asir Province in southwestern Saudi Arabia for more than three decades before becoming governor of Makkah Province in 2007. Prince Saud was the Saudi foreign minister between 1975 and 2015. Prince Turki served as head of Saudi Intelligence, ambassador to the United Kingdom, and later ambassador to the United States. One of Faisal's sons, Abdul Rahman, was a graduate of Sandhurst Military Academy, and he died in March 2014. Faisal's son Mohammed was a businessman. Faisal's daughters also held important roles in Saudi society. From 2013 to 2016, his daughter Sara served in the Shura Council. She is also a prominent activist for women's education and other social issues in Saudi Arabia, and so are her sisters Lolowah, Latifa, and Haifa.

Faisal's daughter Haifa is married to Prince Bandar, son of Faisal's half-brother Sultan by a concubine. The marriage of Princess Haifa and Prince Bandar forced Prince Sultan to recognize Bandar as a legitimate prince. Another daughter of Faisal, Lolowah, is a prominent activist for women's education in Saudi Arabia. In 1962 his daughter Sara founded one of the first charitable organizations, Al Nahda, which won the first Chaillot prize for human rights organisations in the Gulf in 2009. Her spouse was Prince Muhammed, one of King Saud's sons. His granddaughter Reem bint Mohammed is a photographer and gallery owner based in Jeddah, while another of his granddaughters, Reema bint Bandar, is Saudi Arabia's first female ambassador.

Unlike most of his half-brothers, Faisal spoke fluent English and French. However, he preferred to speak in Arabic. When his translators made errors, Faisal would correct them.

=== Personality and appearance ===
Faisal was known for his integrity, extreme humility, kindness, and tact with everyone. As a result, he was ascetic, avoiding displays of extravagance and luxury. He had many hobbies, some of which were falconry, hunting, literature, reading, and poetry. He was also a big admirer of the yearly Najdi festivals and celebrations. Faisal chose to work long hours and set aside some of his interests after assuming power and becoming preoccupied with state affairs.

After coming to power in 1964, Faisal quickly caught the attention of the international public. The New York Times stated that Faisal looked like "someone out of a poem by Rudyard Kipling or a casting office in Hollywood." He was around six feet tall, above average height, but not quite as tall as his father Abdulaziz and his brother Saud. Compared to other Muslim rulers such as Mohammad Reza Pahlavi, the Shah of Iran, who almost exclusively wore European-styled outfits, Faisal was known to have dressed modestly, as he was most often seen wearing a traditional Saudi thawb, even in the presence of foreign dignitaries.

== Assassination and aftermath ==
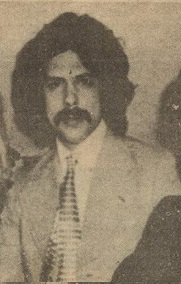
Prince Faisal bin Musaid, King Faisal's assassin, pictured in January 1975, two months before the assassination

On 25 March 1975, the King was shot point-blank three times and killed by Faisal bin Musaid, son of his half-brother Musaid bin Abdulaziz. He had just come back from the United States. The murder occurred at a majlis (literally 'a place for sitting'), an event where the king or leader opens up his residence to the citizens to enter and petition him.

In the waiting room, Prince Faisal talked to Kuwaiti representatives who were also waiting to meet King Faisal. When the prince went to embrace him, King Faisal leaned to kiss his nephew in accordance with Saudi custom. At that instant, Prince Faisal took out a pistol and shot him. The first shot hit the King's chin and the second one went through his ear. A bodyguard hit Prince Faisal with a sheathed sword. Oil minister Zaki Yamani yelled repeatedly not to kill the prince.

King Faisal was quickly taken to Central Hospital in Riyadh. He was still alive as doctors massaged his heart and gave him a blood transfusion. Their efforts were unsuccessful, and he died shortly afterward. Both before and after the attack the assassin was reported to be calm. Following the killing, Riyadh had three days of mourning during which all government activities were suspended. The funeral service for King Faisal was performed at the King Abdulaziz Mosque in Riyadh, and was attended by several head of states such as Sheikh Zayed bin Sultan, Yasser Arafat, Hafez al-Assad, Idi Amin, Houari Boumédiène, Ahmed Hassan al-Bakr, Gaafar Nimeiry, Prince Juan Carlos, Anwar Sadat, Mohammad Daoud Khan and Zulfikar Ali Bhutto. He was buried in al-Oud cemetery on 26 March 1975. During the funeral, the newly ascended King Khalid wept over his murdered brother's body.

One theory for the King's murder was avenging the death of Prince Khalid bin Musaid, the brother of Prince Faisal bin Musaid. King Faisal instituted secular reforms that led to the installation of television, which provoked violent protests. Prince Khalid led an attack on a television station in 1966, and he was shot dead by a policeman.

In a documentary entitled Faisal, Legacy of a King, Faisal's grandson Amr bin Mohammed bin Faisal claims that the King had distanced himself from the world days before his death. Zaki Yamani claimed that King Faisal told his own relatives and friends about a dream he had in which his father, the late King Abdulaziz, was traveling in a car and asked him to get in. Yamani went on to say that Faisal felt that his death was approaching. In Islamic beliefs, dreams hold significance and can sometimes carry messages or guidance.

Prince Faisal bin Musaid was captured directly after the attack. He was at first officially declared insane, but following the trial a panel of Saudi medical experts decided that he was sane when he shot the King. The nation's high religious court convicted him of regicide and sentenced him to death. He was publicly beheaded in Deera Square in Riyadh.

== Memorials and legacy ==
After his death, Faisal's sons established an international philanthropic organisation, the King Faisal Foundation, in his honour. Faisal was eulogized by lyricist Robert Hunter in the title track of the Grateful Dead's 1975 album Blues for Allah and this album is tribute to him, King Faisal was fan of this group.

Gerald de Gaury published a biography of Faisal entitled Faisal: King of Saudi Arabia. In 2013 Russian Arabist Alexei Vassiliev published another biography, King Faisal of Saudi Arabia: Personality, Faith and Times. A movie directed by Agustí Villaronga in 2019 entitled Born a King is about the visit of Faisal to London in 1919, when he was thirteen years old.

In October 1976, King Khalid initiated the construction of Faisal Mosque in Islamabad, Pakistan. Lyallpur, the third largest city of Pakistan, was renamed Faisalabad (literally, "City of Faisal") in 1979 in Faisal's honour. One of the two major Pakistan Air Force bases in Karachi, the largest city in Sindh province, is named "PAF Base Faisal" in Faisal's honour.

== Views ==
The livers are torn apart, and the wings are torn apart when we hear or see our brothers in religion, in the homeland, and in blood, their sanctities are violated, they are displaced and abused daily, not for something they committed, nor for the aggression they attacked, but for the love of control and aggression and to commit injustice. –King Faisal bin Abdulaziz

Faisal held pro-Palestinian views. Throughout his career, he supported the Palestinian cause, and he was noted for his strong criticism of Israel. He was also anti-communist, and Saudi Arabia under Faisal continued to be allied with the United States against the Soviet Union. Faisal also supported pan-Islamism, and he sought to establish unity among Muslims. Nevertheless, he reduced the power of the Islamic clergy during his reign.

== Honours ==
Styles of King Faisal
- Reference style: His Majesty
- Spoken style: Your Majesty

Faisal's royal flag before 1973 (left) and from 1973 onwards

Faisal has received numerous honours from the countries he visited both before and after assuming power. The honours and awards given to Faisal are displayed at the King Faisal Center for Research and Islamic Studies in Riyadh which was established by the King Faisal Foundation in 1983. The awards are as follows:

- Afghanistan:
  - Collar of the Order of the Supreme Sun
  - Order of Independence
- Belgium:
  - Grand Officer of the Order of Leopold
- Chad:
  - Grand Cross of the National Order of Chad
- Egypt:
  - Order of Ismail
  - Grand Cordon of the Order of the Nile
  - Collar of the Order of the Nile
- France:
  - Grand Cross of the Legion of Honour
  - Grand Officer of the Legion of Honour
- Greece:
  - Grand Cross of the Order of George I
- Guinea:
  - Grand Cross of the National Order of Merit
- Indonesia:
  - First Class of the Star of the Republic of Indonesia
- Iran:
  - Order of the Crown (1953)
  - Order of Pahlavi
  - Order of Taj
- Iraq:
  - Order of the Two Rivers
  - Order of Faisal I
- Italy:
  - Knight Grand Cross of the Order of the Crown of Italy
- Japan:
  - Grand Cordon of the Order of the Chrysanthemum
- Jordan:
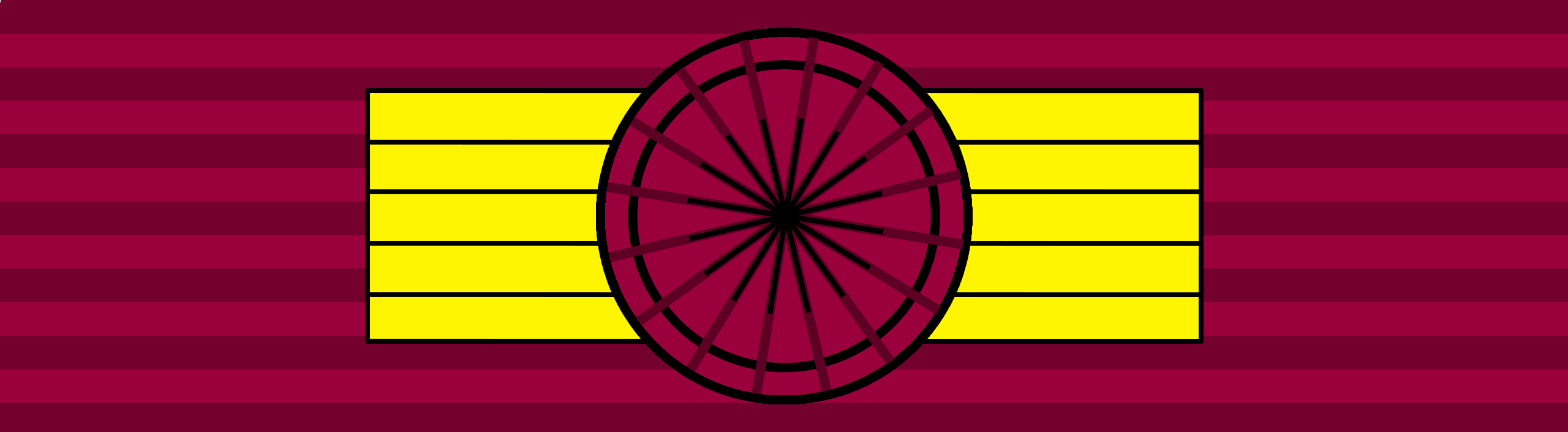
  - Collar of the Order of Al-Hussein bin Ali
  - Grand Cordon of the Supreme Order of the Renaissance, twice
- Lebanon:
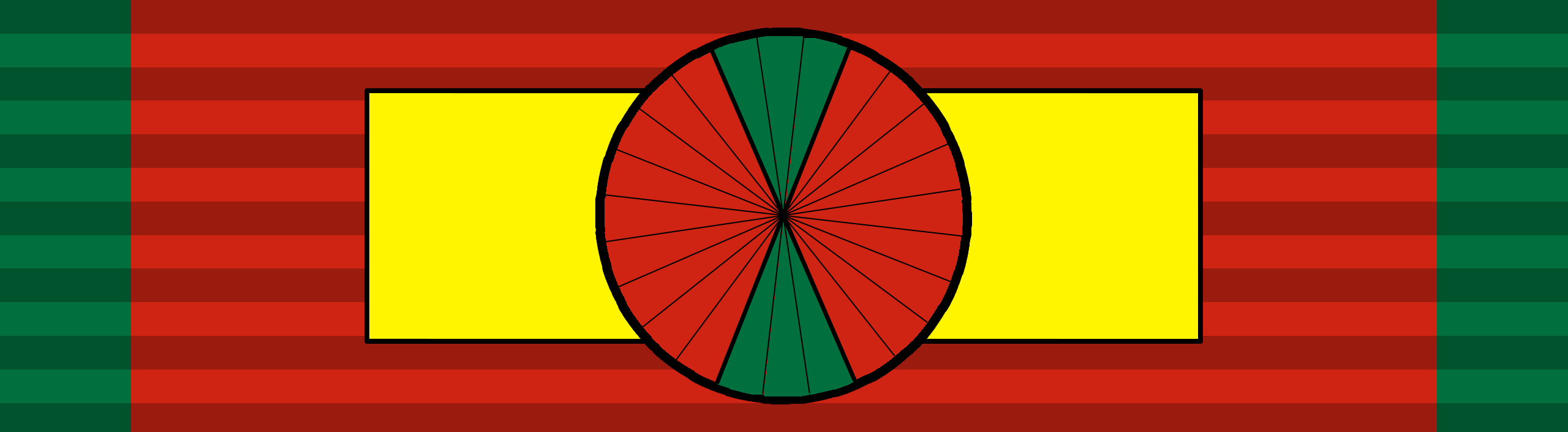
  - Grand Cordon of the National Order of the Cedar
- Liberia:
  - Grand Cordon of the Order of the Pioneers of Liberia
- Libya:
  - Grand Collar of the Order of Idris I
- Malaysia:
  - Order of the Crown of the Realm
- Mauritania:
  - National Order of Merit
- Morocco:
  - Collar of the Order of Muhammad
- Netherlands:
  - Knight Grand Cross of the Order of Orange-Nassau
- Niger:
  - Grand Cross of the Order of Niger
  - Grand Cross of the Order of Merit
- Oman:
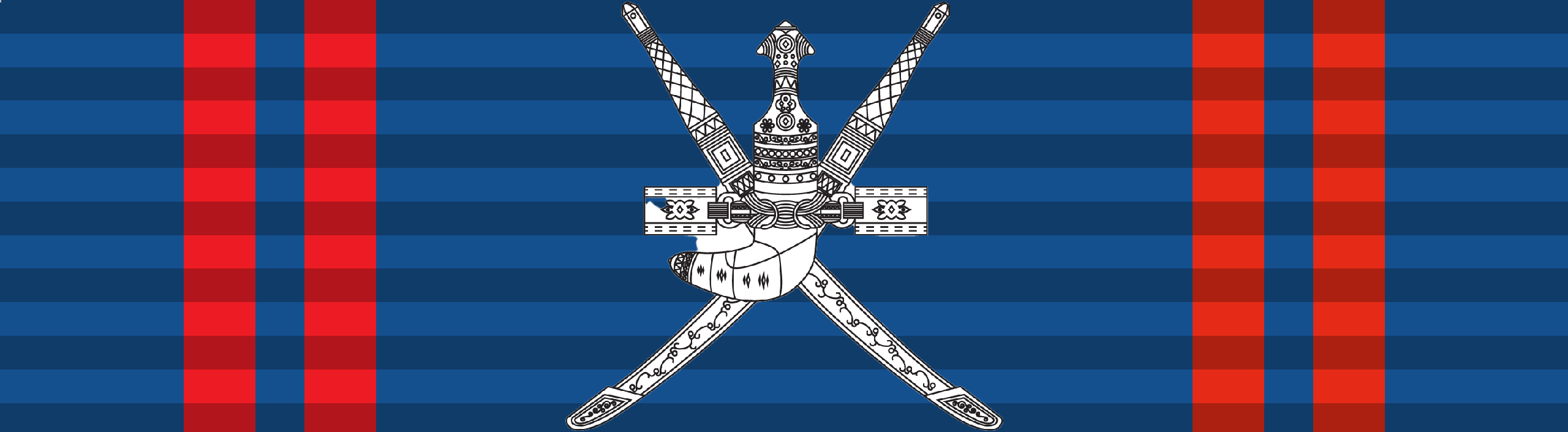
  - Collar of the Military Order of Oman
- Poland:
  - Commander's Cross with Star of the Order of Polonia Restituta
- Pakistan:
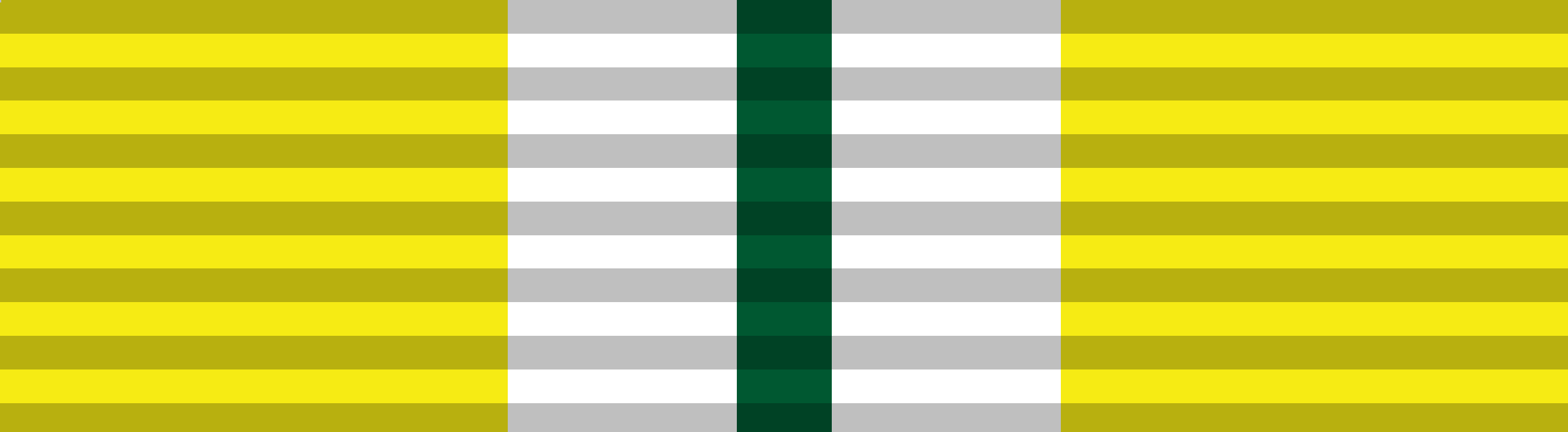
  - Nishan-e-Imtiaz
  - Nishan-e-Pakistan
- Saudi Arabia:
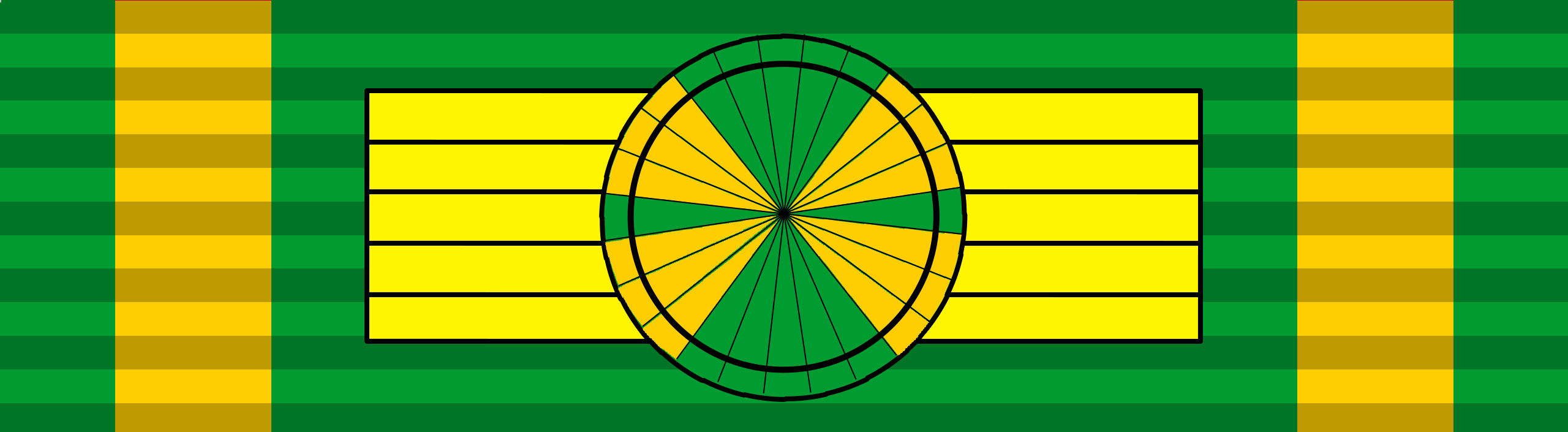
  - Order of King Abdulaziz
- Senegal:
  - Grand Cross of the National Order of Merit
- Somalia:
  - Collar of the Order of the Somali Star
- South Korea:
  - First Class of the Order of Diplomatic Service Merit
- Spain:
  - Collar of the Order of Civil Merit
- Sudan:
  - Collar of Honour
- Syria:
  - Member First Class of the Order of Umayyad
- Taiwan:
  - Grand Cordon of the Order of Brilliant Jade
  - Special Grand Cordon of the Order of Brilliant Star
- Tunisia:
  - Grand Cordon of the Order of Glory
  - Collar of the Order of Independence
- Turkey:
  - Gold Red Crescent Medal
- Uganda:
  - First Class of the Distinguished Order of The Nile
- United Kingdom:
  - Royal Victorian Chain
  - Knight Grand Cross of the Most Excellent Order of the British Empire
  - Second Class of the Order of St Michael and St George
- Zaire:
  - Grand Cordon of the National Order of the Leopard

== Notes ==
Faisal of Saudi Arabia House of Saud Born: 1906 Died: 1975
Regnal titles
Preceded by Saud	King of Saudi Arabia; 2 November 1964 – 25 March 1975	Succeeded by Khalid
Saudi Arabian royalty
Preceded by Saud	Crown Prince of Saudi Arabia; 9 November 1953 – 2 November 1964	Succeeded by Muhammad
Political offices
New title	Minister for Foreign Affairs of Saudi Arabia; 1930–1960	Succeeded by Ibrahim bin Abdullah Al Suwaiyel
Preceded by Ibrahim bin Abdullah Al Suwaiyel	Minister for Foreign Affairs of Saudi Arabia; 1962–1975	Succeeded by Saud bin Faisal Al Saud
Preceded by Saud bin Abdulaziz Al Saud	Prime Minister of Saudi Arabia; 1954–1960	Succeeded by Saud bin Abdulaziz Al Saud
Preceded by Saud bin Abdulaziz Al Saud	Prime Minister of Saudi Arabia; 1962–1975	Succeeded by Khalid bin Abdulaziz Al Saud
