= Saad bin Faisal Al Saud =

Saudi royal and businessman (1942–2017)

- Born: 1942
- Died: April 2017 (aged 74–75)
- Burial: 11 April 2017; Al Adl cemetery, Mecca
Names
- Saad bin Faisal bin Abdulaziz bin Abdul Rahman bin Faisal Al Saud
- House: Al Saud
- Father: King Faisal
- Mother: Haya bint Turki bin Abdulaziz Al Turki
- Education: University of Cambridge

Saad bin Faisal Al Saud (Arabic: سعد بن الفيصل آل سعود; 1942 – April 2017) was a Saudi royal, a son of King Faisal, one of the grandsons of Saudi Arabia's founder King Abdulaziz, and a businessman.

== Early life and education ==
Saad bin Faisal was born in 1942 and was the son of King Faisal and Haya bint Turki bin Abdulaziz Al Turki. His mother was a member of the Al Jiluwi clan. Prince Saad's full siblings were Prince Khalid and Princess Noura (died March 2022).

Prince Saad was a graduate of the Hun School of Princeton like his brothers. Then he attended Princeton University, but left it soon. He obtained a law degree from the University of Cambridge.

== Career ==
Prince Saad was the deputy governor at Petromin from 1971 to 1973. He also worked at the Ministry of Petroleum. Following his retirement from the government, he began to be involved in business. He headed the King Faisal Foundation. From 1999 to 2017, he was a member of Effat University board of founders and board of trustees. From 2018, his daughter, Sara, joined both boards as a member.

== Death ==
He died in April 2017 and was buried in Mecca following the funeral prayers at the Grand Mosque on 11 April.
