= Reem bint Mohammed Al Saud =

Saudi Arabian royal and photographer

- Born: Jeddah, Saudi Arabia
- House: Al Saud
- Father: Mohammed bin Faisal Al Saud
- Occupation: Collector, photographer, gallery owner

Reem bint Mohammed Al Saud (Arabic: ريم بنت محمد آل سعود), also known as Reem Al Faisal, is a Saudi Arabian photographer and gallery owner, who lives in Jeddah and Paris.

== Biography ==
Reem is the daughter of Mohammed bin Faisal and granddaughter of King Faisal of Saudi Arabia. She studied Arabic literature at King Abdulaziz University in Jeddah before leaving the school to attend Spéos in Paris to pursue photography.

She authored Diwan Al Noor: A Photographic Journey through Light, Water, and People and The Hajj. Her primary medium is black and white photography, although work she unveiled in 2016 incorporated the use of colour and graphic design. She has exhibited in Bahrain, China, Dubai, Egypt, France, Germany, Korea, the Netherlands, Palestine, Singapore, Spain, and the United States.

The Empty Quarter, a photography gallery run by her in Dubai, opened in 2008 and was the first of its kind in the region. A sister gallery, located in Jeddah, opened in 2015.

In 2016 she bought the house of Chris Hardwick in Los Angeles. Her former US property was an apartment at Sierra Towers building in West Hollywood which she owned between 2008 and 2013.

In 2017 Reem Al Faisal was awarded Officier de l’Ordre des Arts et des Lettres, French order, due to her contributions to arts.

== Exhibitions ==
- Al Hajj (2006)
- Images from the Arab World (2007)
- Edge of Arabia London (2008)
- Domination, Hegemony, and the Panopticon (2012)
- Reem Al Faisal Photography (2012)
- 25 Years of Arab Creativity (2013)
- St. Road (2013)
- Royal Bridges: Convergence (2016)
