= Agricultural Development Fund of Saudi Arabia =

Agricultural Development Fund of Saudi Arabia (ADF)
- Native name: صندوق التنمية الزراعية
- Founded: 26 April 1963; 62 years ago
- Headquarters: Riyadh, Kingdom of Saudi Arabia
- Key people: Abdulrahman Al-Fadhli (Chairman)
- Website: https://adf.gov.sa/en/

Agricultural Development Fund of Saudi Arabia (ADF) was founded pursuant to a royal decree in 1963. The main purpose of its establishment is to finance the agricultural activities in Saudi Arabia by providing loans to farmers. The Director General of the ADF is Munir bin Fahd Al Sahli. Since its establishment 54 years ago, the ADF had paid an amount of $8.8bn to support emerging and small farmers. In 2018, the ADF allocated an amount of $800m to promote the sustainable rural development program of Saudi Arabia.
