= Petromin Corporation =

Saudi Arabian lubricants and automotive services company

- Type: Oil and Lubricant manufacturer
- Industry: Industrial, Engine Oil and Lubricants
- Founded: 24 February 1968; 58 years ago
- Headquarters: Jeddah, Saudi Arabia
- Area served: Middle East, Africa and expanding to Asia
- Products: Engine Oil, Petrol Fuel, Diesel Oil, Hydraulic fluid
- Services: Automotive & Lubricants services
- Website: http://www.petromin.com/

The Petromin Corporation is a Saudi Arabian lubricants and automotive services company, operating in lubricant oils including manufacturer, industrial, and automotive oils and lubricants, car servicing (Petromin Express), fuel retailing and car dealerships.

== History ==
Petromin was established by a royal decree on 24 February 1968 The initial name of the company was Petromin Lubricating Oil Company and was renamed to Saudi Arabian Lubricating Oil Company in 1997. It was established as a joint venture between Saudi Aramco and Mobil investments and started production at its first blending plant in Jeddah, in 1970. The first director general of the company was Abdulhadi Taher.

The company was planned to replace foreign-owned Aramco as the states primary oil company, but due to company inefficiencies, personal rivalries and corruption, instead it was decided to make it "Saudized" Aramco.

Petromin was a joint venture between Mobil Investments (29% stake) and Saudi Aramco (71% stake), an affiliate of ExxonMobil with an annual sale of 80,000 metric tons and an annual turnover of $200 million. In 2007 it was purchased by Dabbagh Group and Gulf Oil Corporation, a subsidiary of Indian Hinduja Group, for $200 million. Dabbagh took a 51% stake and Hinduja a 49% stake in the new joint venture.

In 2010 the Hinduja Group announced the launch of the initial public offering of Petromin.

In 2013, The Dabbagh group purchased the Hinduja stake based on a total valuation of more than $700 million, made by Deutsche Bank, who assisted in the deal.

In 2017, the company employed around 5,000 people.

The company also runs a gas station network across the country, which is partly connected to Petromin Express service station, offering combined automotive services. Petromin is one of only two companies allowed to set up fuel stations along highways in Saudi Arabia. In 2017 the company first announced its plans to build 240 gas stations across the Kingdom.

Petromin entered a partnership with Nissan, becoming the official authorized distribution agent in Saudi Arabia. The first showroom was opened in Riyadh on 16 October 2016.

== Operations ==
Petrolube currently operates three main plants. Electromin offer passenger and commercial electric vehicles, their maintenance services, installation of EV charging infrastructure, along with multiple other EV-related services and products.

In 2022, Petromin introduced National Auto Parts Co., a subsidiary that sell multi-brand auto parts through an online platform to wholesalers and independent garages.

NTSC offers Fleet Maintenance, Fleet Management, Operational Leasing, Petromin Commercial Vehicle Care (PCVC), Diesel Vehicle Service, and Repair. As a subsidiary of Petromin group, NTSC extends its services to clients throughout KSA.

The Jeddah plant of Petromin is one of the biggest oil and mobilization plants in the Middle East and Petromin Corporation is the largest maker of lubricants in Saudi Arabia, with a present production capacity of 300,000 metric tons.

National Auto Parts Company (NAP), acquired SpareIt, an Indian auto-tech platform.

Electromin, a NAP subsidiary, formed in 2022 a strategic partnership with Quantron AG. The partnership initially involved the distribution of Quantron's QARGO 4 EV light truck in Saudi Arabia. Siemens also provided EV chargers to Electromin, Saudi Arabia's e-mobility unit, for their region-wide charging network. Quantron entered insolvency proceedings in October 2024.
