= List of ambassadors of Iran to Saudi Arabia =

Coordinates: 21.551480°N 39.175183°E

Ambassador of Iran to Saudi Arabia
- Coat of Arms of Iran
- Incumbent; Alireza Enayati since September 6, 2023
- Nominator: Foreign Minister of Iran
- Appointer: President (approved by the Supreme Leader)
- Inaugural holder: Habibullah Khan Hoveida
- Formation: 1930
- Abolished: between January 3, 2016 to September 6, 2023

The Iranian ambassador in Riyadh is the official representative of the Government in Tehran to the Government of Saudi Arabia.

The head of the Iranian Interests Section in the Consulate of Switzerland in Jeddah represents the Iranian interests in Saudi Arabia.

== List of representatives ==
Diplomatic accreditation	Diplomatic accreditation Iranian calendars	Ambassador	Persian language	Observations	List of presidents of Iran	King of Saudi Arabia	Term end	Term end Iranian calendars
1934	1312			Till 1934 the Iranian ambassador to Egypt in Cairo was accredited in Jedda Saudi Arabia.	Reza Shah	Ibn Saud		
December 15, 1929	1307	Habibullah Khan Hoveida	Persian: حبیب‌الله عین‌الملک	Date of Establishment: 1930 Iranian consul general in Damascus, Habibullah Khan 'Ayn al-Mulk Huwayda, Habibullah Ein-ol-Molk was Iran's ambassador to Lebanon and Saudi Arabia and other Arab countries who lived in Hejaz (Saudi Arabia), Lebanon and Jordan, and was once the head of the Baha'i Faith for many years. He was familiar with Laurence of Saudi Arabia and was familiar with the formation of the Saudi monarchy.	Reza Shah	Ibn Saud	1934	1312
1929	1307			Habibollah Khan Hoveida was the father of Amir Abbas Hoveida who served as Prime Minister of Iran for 13 years during the reign of Mohammad Riza Shah Pahlavi Mirza Habibullah Khan Hoveida was the representative whom Persia sent to the Hejaz on a special mission in the	Reza Shah	Ibn Saud		
1929	1307			Mirza Habibullah Khan Al-Reza or Abdul Malik was elected as Iran's ... one of the motives of Mirza Habibullah Khan, who later used Hoveyda name for himself,	Reza Shah	Ibn Saud		
1934	1312	Mohammad Ali Moghadam	Persian: محمدعلی مقدم	Abd al-Aziz Ibn Saud was displeased with Persia's reluctance to recognize his government, and he reacted to it in August 1927, by asking for the transfer of the Persian consul in Jeddah, Mohammad Ali Moghadam.	Reza Shah	Ibn Saud	1936	1314
1936	1314			The Iranian ambassador to Egypt was concurrently accredited in Jedda.	Reza Shah	Ibn Saud	1944	1314
1943	1321			In 1943, a fight broke out between Iranian pilgrims en route to Makkah and local residents who objected to the Iranian caravan's morning call for prayers (Adhan), which bears witness to imam Ali being the prophet's rightful successor.	Mohammad Reza Pahlavi	Ibn Saud		
1943	1321			In December 1943, an Iranian citizen, Abu Taleb Yazidi was arrested and beheaded after a local judge in Makkah passed a verdict charging him with a crime on the extremely sacred remissions of the Masjid Al Haram, where the kaaba is located. According to an Iranian diplomat, Egyptian pilgrims testified that the Iranian pilgrim became nauseous, vomited in his garb, and then supposedly attempted to throw it at the Kaaba - when, in fact, he had only lifted his garb to avoid polluting the grounds of the Masjid Al Haram.	Mohammad Reza Pahlavi	Ibn Saud		
1943	1321			Despite official objections to the verdict by the Egyptian embassy representing Iran's interests in Saudi Arabia after the incident, and despite Egypt's subsequent attempts to issue a tripartite statement to resolve the misunderstanding, the local judge held up the testimony of the Egyptian pilgrims. (The decision may have been influenced by the archaic belief that Shi'is were responsible for smearing excrement on the Black Stone of the Kaaba, an act of desecration dating to the seventeenth century.)	Mohammad Reza Pahlavi	Ibn Saud		
1944	1322			1944 to 1948 interruption of diplomatic relations. In the second incident, the Saudi religious police arrested an Iranian pilgrim (Hajji Abu Talib al-Yazdi) inside the Great Mosque in Makkah for throwing excrement at the Kaaba. He was arrested, tried, found guilty, and beheaded in accordance	Mohammad Reza Pahlavi	Ibn Saud	1948	1326
1948	1326			For the third time Iranian ambassador to Egypt is acting in Saudi Arabia.	Mohammad Reza Pahlavi	Ibn Saud		
1949	1327	Abdol-Hossein Sadiq-Esfandiari	Persian: عبدالحسین صدیق اسفندیاری	1895-1986 Abd al-Hassein Sadig Isandiari, These were restored four years later and the first resident Iranian ambassador, Abdul Husain Siddiq Isfandiari arrived in Jeddah in 1949. Prince (later King) Faisal visited Tehran in 1932 followed by a state visit by King Saud in 1955 and by	Mohammad Reza Pahlavi	Ibn Saud	1950	1328
1952	1330	Mozaffar Alam	Persian: مظفر اعلم		Mohammad Reza Pahlavi	Ibn Saud	1955	1332
August 15, 1954	1332	Hossein Diba	Persian: حسین دیبا (وزیر مختار)		Mohammad Reza Pahlavi	Saud of Saudi Arabia	1956	
July 7, 1954	1332	Mahmoud Salahi	Persian: محمود صلاحی	Ambassador, 1939: Consulate affairs The Imperial Iranian Consul General in Hamburg, Mahmoud Salahi, was granted the exequatur on February 1, 1939, under the name of the Reich,	Mohammad Reza Pahlavi	Saud of Saudi Arabia		
1957	1335	Ziauddin Gharib	Persian: ضیاءالدین قریب	Zia al-Din Qarib	Mohammad Reza Pahlavi	Saud of Saudi Arabia	1960	1341
1961	1339	Afrasiab Navai	Persian: افراسیاب نوایی		Mohammad Reza Pahlavi	Saud of Saudi Arabia	1963	1341
1963	1341	Ali Asemi	Persian: : علی عاصمی	Chargé d'affaires in Jeddah, From 1966 to 1968 he was Iranian ambassador to Syria	Mohammad Reza Pahlavi	Saud of Saudi Arabia	1963	
1966	1344	Mohammad Hossein Mashayekh Faridani	Persian: محمدحسین مشایخ فریدنی	1963 he was ambassador in Bagdad	Mohammad Reza Pahlavi	Faisal of Saudi Arabia		
1971	1349	Muhammad Ghavam	Persian: سعید عرب	Saudi Arabia: Muhammad Ghavam, Jeddah (A).	Mohammad Reza Pahlavi	Faisal of Saudi Arabia	1972	
1972	1350	Ahmad Jaafar Raed	Persian: جعفر رائد	In 1972 Jafar Raed, the Iranian ambassador to Saudi Arabia, approached the Palestinian leader. The Shah also raised the matter at the Morocco Islamic summit. Arafat was reported to have been in Tehran on at least two occasions in the early	Mohammad Reza Pahlavi	Faisal of Saudi Arabia	April 1, 1979	1357
February 1, 1979	1356			Iranian Revolution	Mohammad Reza Pahlavi	Khalid of Saudi Arabia		
1983	1361	Fakhri	Persian: فخری	Riyadh's alliance with Saddam Hussein during the Iran–Iraq War of 1980—88 came about not so much because common interests had emerged as because Saudis fear of an Iranian Revolution.	Ali Khamenei	Fahd of Saudi Arabia		
1983	1361	Alaeddin Boroujerdi	Persian: علاءالدین بروجردی	Chargé d'affaires Ala'Uddin Brugerdi, Embassy of Iran 116 Medina Rd., Jeddah Ala'Uddin Brugerdi Embassy of	Ali Khamenei	Fahd of Saudi Arabia	1984	
1983	1361	AbulFadl			Ali Khamenei	Fahd of Saudi Arabia		
1983	1361	Hussein Sadeqi	Persian: حسین صادقی (دیپلمات)	Chargé d'affaires	Ali Khamenei	Fahd of Saudi Arabia		
July 30, 1984	1362	Mojtaba Hashemi	Persian: سید مجتبی هاشمی	Seyyed Mojtaba Hashemi (November 13, 1919, in Tehran, Iran), the first commander of the Central Revolutionary Committee of Tehran, and commander of the Islamic Fadaiyan group during the Iran-Iraq war. He was assassinated in May 28, 1985, in Wahdat-e-Islami (formerly Shapur) Street, Tehran. Mojtaba Hashemi Samareh, Iranian ambassador to the IAEA.	Ali Khamenei	Fahd of Saudi Arabia		
1987	1365	Parviz Afshari	Persian: پرویز افشاری	1987 Mecca incident, But the Deputy Chief of Mission at the Iranian Embassy in Riyadh, Parviz Afshari, complained a heavy police guard was still Aug 18, 1987 - But the Deputy Chief of Mission at the Iranian Embassy in Riyadh, Parviz Afshari, complained a heavy police guard was still stationed around his embassy premises. He also claimed that the Iranian consulate in Jidda was	Ali Khamenei	Fahd of Saudi Arabia	1988	1366
April 26, 1988	1366			Diplomatic relations broken Riyadh severed diplomatic relations on 26 April 1988 (MEED 6:5:88, Saudi Arabia).	Ali Khamenei	Fahd of Saudi Arabia		
June 5, 1988	1366			In February 1989, Rafsanjani said that Iran and Saudi Arabia were holding indirect talks to resume relations.. Interrupting relations from 6 May 1988 to in the July 31 clashes between Iranian pilgrims and Saudi security forces in the holy city of Mecca in which hundreds of Moslems were killed	Ali Khamenei	Fahd of Saudi Arabia	1991	1369
June 5, 1988	1366			The Turkish embassy is waiting for approval from Riyadh to look after Iran's interests in the kingdom, following the 26 April break in diplomatic relations (MEED 6:5:88). Since the rupture, Iran has accused the kingdom of sending a spy to Iran	Ali Khamenei	Fahd of Saudi Arabia		
June 5, 1988	1367			Ayatollah Khomeini died on 3 June 1989 funeral of Rummala Comeini Saudi did not send an emissary, 5–6 June 1989 Death and state funeral of Ruhollah Khomeini	Akbar Hashemi Rafsanjani	Fahd of Saudi Arabia		
1992	1370	Mohammad Ali Najafabadi	Persian: محمدعلی هادی نجف‌آبادی	Hadi Najafabadi, an MP who later became Iranian ambassador to Saudi Arabia Mohammad Ali Hadi Najafabadi is an Iranian cleric and politician. During his stay in Ayatollah Khomeini's residence in Paris, he was translating his speeches into Arabic, and after the revolution, he was the representative of the first and second sessions of the Islamic Consultative Assembly from Tehran, and later Iran's ambassador to Saudi Arabia and the United Arab Emirates, and the Deputy Foreign Minister's Consular and Parliamentary At the time of the Ministry of Commerce Kharazi. During his visit to Iran, President McFarlin's visit to Iran in 1365, accompanied by Hassan Rouhani and Fereydoun Verdinejad, Hadi participated in secret discussions with him. [3] His remarks in the early 1970s about Iran and Saudi Arabia's similarities to the two wings of the Islamic world were criticized. In Iran's political circles	Akbar Hashemi Rafsanjani	Fahd of Saudi Arabia		
1994	1372	Mohammad Hosein Taromi-Rad	Persian: محمدحسین طارمی	Hassan Taromi-Rad, Mohammad Hosein Taromi-rad	Akbar Hashemi Rafsanjani	Fahd of Saudi Arabia	1995	
September 1, 1995	1373	Mohammad Reza Nouri Shahroudi	Persian: محمدرضا نوری شاهرودی	Mohammad Reza Nouri Shahrudi Hojatoleslam Mohammad-. Reza Nouri Shahroudi	Akbar Hashemi Rafsanjani	Fahd of Saudi Arabia	January 1, 1998	
September 13, 2000	1383	Ali Asghar Khaji	Persian: علی اصغر خجی	Iran's ambassador to the European Union	Mahmoud Ahmadinejad	Fahd of Saudi Arabia	2004	
2004	1384	Hussein Sadeqi	Persian: حسین صادقی (دیپلمات)		Mahmoud Ahmadinejad	Fahd of Saudi Arabia	November 27, 2006	
November 27, 2006	1384	Mohammad Hosseini (diplomat)	Persian: محمد حسینی		Mahmoud Ahmadinejad	Abdullah of Saudi Arabia	2008	
2008	1386	Mohammad Javad Rasouli Mahallaty	Persian: محمد جواد رسولی محلاتی	Javad Rasouli 1996-2005 he was consul general in Bremen	Mahmoud Ahmadinejad	Abdullah of Saudi Arabia	July 23, 2014	
August 1, 2014	1392	Hussein Sadeqi			Hassan Rouhani	Abdullah of Saudi Arabia	January 3, 2016	1394
September 24, 2015	1393			2015 Mina disaster	Hassan Rouhani	Salman of Saudi Arabia	2015	
January 3, 2016	1394			On January 2, 2016 Nimr al-Nimr was executed and the Embassy of the Kingdom of Saudi Arabia, Tehran was occupied and burnt the diplomatic relations between the two regimes were cut.	Hassan Rouhani	Salman of Saudi Arabia		
October 25, 2017	1396			The Iranian Interest Section will be located in Jeddah.	Hassan Rouhani	Salman of Saudi Arabia		
September 6, 2023	1402	Alireza Enayati	Persian: علیرضا عنایتی	The diplomatic relationship between Iran and Saudi Arabia reestablished after seven years.	Ebrahim Raisi	Salman of Saudi Arabia		

== See also ==
- Iran–Saudi Arabia relations
