= List of ambassadors of Saudi Arabia to Iran =

Coordinates: 35.802080°N 51.476068°E

Ambassador of Saudi Arabia to Iran
- سفير المملكة العربية السعودية لدى طهران (Ambassador of Saudi Arabia to Tehran)
- Coat of Arms of Saudi Arabia
- Incumbent; Abdullah bin Saud Al-Anazi
- Inaugural holder: Assayid Hamza Ghoth
- Formation: 1955

The Saudi ambassador in Tehran is the official representative of the Government in Riyadh to the Government of the Iran.

== List of representatives ==
Diplomatic accreditation	Ambassador	Arabic	Observations	King of Saudi Arabia	Iranian head of state	Term end
1929			Throughout the years of Saudi- Iranian diplomatic relations (1929-79), Saudi Arabia appointed only 3 ambassadors to Iran. Iran, on the other hand, appointed 13 ambassadors to Saudi Arabia between 1930 and 1979.	Ibn Saud	Reza Shah	
1955	Assayid Hamza Ghoth	السيد حمزة غوث	Hamzah Ghawth, Hamza Ghaus, Saudi Arabia appointed Hamja Ghoth as its first ambassador to Iran, and Tehran appointed Abd al-Hassein Sadig Isfandiari as its minister to Saudi Arabia. King Saud arrives in Tehran, and attendants King Saud Mohammed Srour Albban Finance Minister, the Saudi ambassador in Iran, Mr. Hamza Ghaus, and Prince Mohammed bin Saud, and the commander of the Royal Guard, Major General Mohammed bin Suleiman Ant 1955	Saud of Saudi Arabia	Mohammad Reza Shah	
1968	Yusuf Al-Fozan	يوسف الفوزان	Yussef Al-Fawzah Shaikh Yusuf Alfozan, 1968: Department of International Organizations of the Ministry of Foreign Affairs Saudi Arabia Representatives H.E. Shaikh Yusuf Alfozan Ambassador of Saudi Arabia to Iran.	Faisal of Saudi Arabia	Mohammad Reza Shah	
January 1, 1969			[The mutual understanding reached between Iran and Saudi Arabia in 1968 (see MER 1968, p. 187), on the maintenance of influence in the Gulf region, remained the basis of their relationship in 1969 and 1970.]	Faisal of Saudi Arabia	Mohammad Reza Shah	January 1, 1970
1970	Sheikh Muhammad Arab Hashem	الشيخ محمد عرب هاشم		Faisal of Saudi Arabia	Mohammad Reza Shah	
1975	Ibrahim Saleh Bakr	ابراهيم صالح بكر	Sheikh Ibrahim Bakran, His Majesty's Ambassador to Tehran	Khalid of Saudi Arabia	Mohammad Reza Shah	June 1, 1980
1982	Marvan Bashir Al-Roomi	مروان بشير آل رومي		Fahd of Saudi Arabia	Ali Khamenei	
1987	Marvan Bashir Al-Roomi	مروان بشير آل رومي	1987 King Fahd described the Iranian attack on the Saudi embassy in Tehran as the "worst diplomatic crime in history." In condemning Iran's behavior, he pointed out that Iran's refusal to release Al-Ghamdi led to his death.	Fahd of Saudi Arabia	Ali Khamenei	
August 1, 1987	Musaed Al-Ghamdi	مساعد الغامدي	1987 Mecca incident In Tehran, angry mobs retaliated by ransacking the Saudi embassy; they detained and beat several diplomats, including one Saudi official who subsequently died from his injuries. Two Saudi diplomats based in Iran have charged Iran with abusing embassy personnel during and after the sacking of the Saudi Embassy in Tehran last month. Marwan Bashir al Romi, the Saudi charge d'affaires, and Reda Nuzha, the consul general, said in interviews with the Saudi Gazette during the weekend that Saudi personnel and their dependents had been beaten in the attack on the embassy Aug. 1. 1987. The attack followed riots the previous day in the Saudi holy city of Mecca, where Iran accused Saudi police of killing about 275 Iranian pilgrims. In addition, U.S. State Department officials said the Saudi government reported 85 Saudi security personnel and 42 pilgrims of other nationalities were killed. Nuzha said Iranian Revolutionary Guards attacked him, breaking his glasses and causing severe eye damage, which later required an operation. Romi accused Iran of negligence in the medical care of Mosaid al Ghamdi, a Saudi political attache injured in the embassy attack, contributing to his eventual death. He said Saudi Arabia offered to evacuate Ghamdi aboard a medical plane equipped with an operating room but the Iranian government refused. Romi and Nuzha returned to Saudi Arabia last week and expressed concern over the nine Saudi envoys, who have moved backed into the Tehran embassy and are continuing diplomatic functions.	Fahd of Saudi Arabia	Ali Khamenei	
August 17, 1987	Marvan Bashir ar-Roomi	مروان بشير آل رومي	Saudi Charge d'Affaires in Tehran, Marwan Bashir al-Rumi, told the Arab News and Al-Sharq al-Awsat, that the Iranian Foreign Ministry had agreed to return the embassy premises to Saudi diplomats after they are vacated by Iranians.	Fahd of Saudi Arabia	Ali Khamenei	
April 1, 1988	severing of diplomatic relations	قطع العلاقات الدبلوماسية	Saudi Arabia The most significant incident in bilateral ties that led to the severing of diplomatic relations in April 1988, was the 1987 Hajj event. The Saudi Embassy in Tehran had been closed since August 1987 when students ransacked it. In March 1988 the Saudi Arabian Government announced its intention of temporarily limiting the number of pilgrims to Mecca from abroad during the Hajj season, which was to begin in mid-July. National quotas would be allocated on the basis of 1,000 pilgrims for every citizen. This formula gave Iran a quota of 45,000. Iran's supreme religious leader, Ayatollah Khomeini, insisted that 150,000 Iranians, the same number as in 1987, would perform the Hajj and that he would not prevent them from staging political protests at Mecca. In the event, Iran decided not to send pilgrims on the Hajj. Saudi Arabia served its diplomatic relations with Iran in April 1988.	Fahd of Saudi Arabia	Ali Khamenei	
1996	Abdul Latif Abdullah Ibrahim al-Maimanee	عبداللطيف عبدالله إبراهيم المامني	Abdullatif Al-Maimani, The meeting was attended by Saudi Ambassador to Iran Abdullatif Al-Maimani. jy^ NEWS .	Fahd of Saudi Arabia	Akbar Hashemi Rafsanjani	December 31, 1998
1999	Nasser bin Ahmed Al-Bireik	ناصر بن احمد البيريك	Saudi Ambassador to Iran, Nasser al-Braik	Fahd of Saudi Arabia	Mohammad Khatami	2005
2002	Jamil bin Abdullah al Jishi	جميل الجشي	As Khatami was winding up his visit to the kingdom in mid-May, the Saudis made another gesture to Iran by appointing a Shi'i, Consultative Council member Jamil al- Jishi, as ambassador to Tehran., No. 1 Niloufar, Boustan, Pasdaran Ave, Tehran	Fahd of Saudi Arabia	Mohammad Khatami	2004
2005	Morshed al-Berek	مرشد البريك	Expediency Council Chairman Akbar Hashemi Rafsanjani has said that Iran-Saudi Arabia ties are essential for maintaining security in the sensitive Persian Gulf region. In a meeting with the Saudi Arabian Ambassador to Tehran al-Morshed	Fahd of Saudi Arabia	Mahmoud Ahmadinejad	
2006	Osamah Ahmed Al Sanosi Ahmad	اسامه احمد السنوسي		Fahd of Saudi Arabia	Mahmoud Ahmadinejad	2009
2010	Mohammed bin Abbas Al-Kilabi	محمد بن عباس الكيلبي	Mohammed Ibn Abbas al-Kallabi	Abdullah of Saudi Arabia	Mahmoud Ahmadinejad	2015
2014	Abd al-Rahman al-Shihri	عبد الرحمن الشهري	Abdolrahma Bin Gharman al-Shahri	Abdullah of Saudi Arabia	Hassan Rouhani	
January 2, 2015			Mohammed bin Abbas Alkilabi, Saudi Arabia, a spokesman for Tehran’s foreign ministry s Hossein Jaber Ansari said that a new Saudi ambassador would soon take office in the Iranian capital. The current Saudi ambassador has not been in Tehran for over a year.	Salman of Saudi Arabia	Hassan Rouhani	
January 2, 2016			2016 attack on the Saudi diplomatic missions in Iran Moments after Nimr al-Nimr was executed, the Saudi Arabian chargé d'affaires was summoned to the Iranian Foreign Ministry to protest against the execution. Following the attack, Saudi Foreign Minister Adel al-Jubeir announced that they will break off diplomatic relations with Iran, recalling its diplomats from Tehran and declared Iranian diplomats in Riyadh persona non grata ordering them to leave the kingdom within 48 hours. A day later (on 4 January), Saudi Foreign Minister Adel al-Jubeir said that they will end air traffic and trade links with Iran and also cutting off all commercial relations with Iran. In addition, the Saudi government has imposed a travel ban on its citizens from visiting Iran. Iranian pilgrims would still be welcome to visit Islam's holiest sites in Mecca and Medina, either for the annual Hajj or at other times of year on the Umrah pilgrimage. However, Saudi Arabia-Iran relations can be restored immediately step-by-step, unless the Iranian government acts "like a civilized county."	Salman of Saudi Arabia	Hassan Rouhani	January 4, 2016
September 7, 2017			Riyadh and Tehran agree diplomatic exchange to inspect embassy buildings	Salman of Saudi Arabia	Hassan Rouhani	August 3, 2021
February 14, 2018	Hasan Ibrahim Hamad al Zoyed	حسن ابراهيم حمد الزويد	Hasan Ibrahim Hamad Alzoayed Saudi Foreign Minister Adel al-Jubeir in a press conference with his Swiss counterpart Didier Burkhalter in Riyadh said on Sunday that Switzerland will act for Saudi interest section in Tehran.	Salman of Saudi Arabia	Hassan Rouhani	August 3, 2021

== See also ==
- Iran–Saudi Arabia relations
- Embassy of Saudi Arabia, Tehran
- List of ambassadors of Iran to Saudi Arabia
