= 2023 attack on the Azerbaijani embassy in Tehran =

2023 shooting in Iran

Attack on the Azerbaijani embassy in Tehran
- Location: 35°46′02″N 51°27′15″E; Embassy of Azerbaijan in Iran, 16 Rastovan Street, Pasdaran, Tehran
- Date: 27 January 2023; 08:00 (IRST, UTC+3:30)
- Target: Embassy staff
- Attack type: Shooting
- Weapon: Kalashnikov rifle
- Deaths: 1
- Injuries: 2

The embassy of Azerbaijan in Tehran was attacked on 27 January 2023, at around 08:00 a.m. local time. The perpetrator passed by the guard post with a Kalashnikov rifle and opened fire inside the embassy, while its staff tried to neutralize him. The head of the embassy's security service, Orkhan Asgarov, was killed in the attack, while two guards were injured.

Shortly after, a suspect was detained by Iranian police. The State Security Service of Azerbaijan opened a criminal investigation of the attack. President of Azerbaijan Ilham Aliyev strongly condemned the attack. The Azerbaijani side regarded the incident as a "terrorist act". The Ministry of Foreign Affairs of Azerbaijan announced evacuation of the embassy personnel in Tehran. On 29 January Azerbaijan evacuated most of the embassy staff from Tehran and suspended the embassy's operation.

Iranian officials did not consider the attack to be politically motivated. Iran's law enforcement agencies stated that the attack was committed on personal grounds, and that the perpetrator came to the scene with two young children, though CCTV footage released from the embassy shows that he was alone during the attack.

== Background ==
Diplomatic missions of Azerbaijan have been attacked previously, but none lethally. In August 2022, members of the Mahdi Servants Union attacked the Embassy of Azerbaijan in London, removed the Azerbaijani flag from the embassy building and replaced it with a flag featuring an Islamic slogan. They also chanted slogans in Arabic and wrote them on the walls and windows of the embassy building. On 11 October 2022, a car of the Embassy of Azerbaijan in Washington, D.C. was shot at, and the Azerbaijani Ministry of Foreign Affairs summoned the chargé d'affaires of the United States, asking to ensure the security of the Azerbaijani diplomatic mission.

== Attack ==
The attack occurred on 27 January 2023, at around 08:00 a.m. local time, in Tehran, the capital of the Islamic Republic of Iran. The perpetrator, armed with a Kalashnikov rifle, passed the security post when three of the embassy employees were entering the building. As the arriving gunman rammed his car into an embassy Hyundai Sonata, one of the employees returned to see what happened to the car. The attacker broke inside the embassy after him and opened fire. He continued shooting the embassy employees, while the embassy staff tried to neutralize him. The attacker fatally shot the head of the security service, senior lieutenant Orkhan Asgarov, and injured two others. One member of the security staff attempted to wrestle the gun away, but only managed to push the attacker out of the embassy and lock the door. The gunman then fired multiple shots at the embassy gate and tried twice to set the embassy car on fire using a gas cylinder that he brought in the trunk of his car, but failed, and part of his own clothing caught fire during the last attempt. Then he threw away the gun and surrendered to the arriving police. Images showed bullet holes in the embassy's door. That afternoon, CCTV footage from the embassy building was published, showing the moment of the attack.

The condition of the injured was deemed stable.

== Aftermath and motive ==
No motive for the attack has been immediately revealed and Iranian state media did not immediately report the attack. The Azerbaijani government called it a "terrorist act". Subsequent statements by Iranian officials gave no indication that the attack was politically motivated.

Not long after the attack, the Iranian side announced that it had started investigating the matter, with the Azerbaijani side doing the same. The spokesman of the Ministry of Foreign Affairs of Iran, Nasir Kanani, said that after the attack, the police and security forces immediately intervened and the attacker was detained, and placed under investigation. In connection with the attack, the State Security Service of Azerbaijan opened a criminal case under various articles of the Criminal Code of Azerbaijan.

According to Tehran police chief Sardar Hossein Rahimi, the preliminary investigation suggested the motive of the attacker was believed to be personal, with family issues. Rahimi added that the attacker initially arrived at the administrative building with a 14-year-old girl and a 7-year-old boy in a Kia Pride. According to the head of Tehran's Criminal Prosecutor's Office, Mohammad Shahriari, the suspect claimed during the preliminary investigation that his wife went to the embassy in April 2022 and did not return home. He stated that when he visited the embassy many times, he did not receive any response from them and that he thought his wife was at the embassy. According to the Islamic Republic News Agency, the perpetrator filed a missing persons report with the police in Urmia, West Azerbaijan province, over his missing wife, who was from Baku, in mid-April 2022, but the case was closed after police found out that the woman had returned to Azerbaijan. The perpetrator continued his inquiries with Iran's Foreign Ministry and Azerbaijan's Embassy in Tehran. The perpetrator then said that he "decided to go to the embassy this morning with the Kalashnikov rifle I had already prepared".

Azerbaijani Press Agency, citing the CCTV footage and its diplomatic channels stated that this information was completely baseless and added that the attack on the embassy was an act of terrorism. CCTV footage shows that the perpetrator was alone during the attack. Aykhan Hajizadeh, head of the press service department of the Ministry of Foreign Affairs of Azerbaijan, told the embassy that "they don't think that the attack was carried out on personal grounds".

Rahimi was fired from his position within hours after footage emerged that appeared to show an Iranian security guard at the entrance doing nothing to stop the attack. Addressing criticism about the Iranian Diplomatic Police being unarmed, Ahmad-Reza Radan, chief of the Law Enforcement Command, argued that the police guard at the embassies cannot be armed as per protocol and can only call the armed section in the case of emergencies.

On 29 January Deputy Minister of Foreign Affairs of Azerbaijan Khalaf Khalafov announced that 53 embassy staff members have been evacuated from Tehran and that the embassy's operation has been suspended. Five people remained to protect the administrative building and embassy's property.

The perpetrator of the attack, Yasin Hosseinzadeh, was executed on 21 May 2025.

== Official reactions ==
On 28 January, the president of Iran Ebrahim Raisi called the President of Azerbaijan Ilham Aliyev by phone. Raisi expressed his condolences to Aliyev and the family of Orkhan Asgarov, wishing the injured a speedy recovery. Aliyev expressed his strong condemnation of the attack, which he called a terrorist act, and expressed his hope for thorough and transparent investigation and punishment of the perpetrator to the full extent of the law. Aliyev also mentioned the courage of one guard who managed to disarm the attacker and thus prevent further casualties. On 17 February 2023 Aliyev said to reporters: "The fact that, right after this act of terror, the terrorist was interviewed by Iranian media demonstrates that he was one of those who was sent by some of the branches of Iranian establishment. And another strange thing was that two days after, he was announced as mentally disabled. How could they [have] held this expertise so quickly? That is an attempt to protect him from justice".

Several other countries also reacted to the attack. Israeli President Isaac Herzog offered his condolences to Aliyev, who reciprocated with condolences over the Jerusalem synagogue attack in Israel. Saudi Arabia stressed its solidarity with Azerbaijan and its people, and called for respecting diplomatic missions and punishing the perpetrators. President of Egypt Abdel Fattah El-Sisi, who was in Baku the day after the attack, expressed his condolences to Aliyev in person. The United States condemned the attack and supported President Aliyev's call for a prompt investigation, reminding the government of Iran of its responsibility under the Vienna Convention on Diplomatic Relations to protect foreign diplomats in Iran. In a call with Azerbaijani foreign minister Jeyhun Bayramov, Russian foreign minister Sergey Lavrov expressed his condolences and offered to provide any assistance Azerbaijan may require. Official statements published via Twitter by Hungarian president Katalin Novák and Turkish president Recep Tayyip Erdoğan, as well as the accounts of the foreign ministries of Croatia, Estonia, Moldova, Slovakia, and Sweden, also expressed condemnation of the attack in addition to condolences. Ministry of foreign affairs of France also condemned the attack, offered condolences to the families of the victims and called on Iran to "shed light" on the attack.

Supranational bodies responded as well. Stéphane Dujarric, spokesperson for the Secretary-General of the United Nations stated that the UN condemned the attack, emphasized that attacks against diplomatic missions are strictly prohibited under international law, and expressed hope that the perpetrator will be held to account. European Commission spokesman Peter Stano expressed condolences and called for a full investigation and accountability. Bujar Osmani, OSCE chairperson-in-office and foreign minister of North Macedonia, strongly condemned the attack and called for accountability of the perpetrators.

== See also ==
- 2010 attack on Pakistan ambassador to Iran
- 2016 attack on the Saudi diplomatic missions in Iran
- Azerbaijan–Iran relations
