= Tehran attack =

Tehran attack may refer to:

- 2010 attack on Pakistan ambassador to Iran
- 2011 attack on the British Embassy in Iran
- 2016 attack on the Saudi diplomatic missions in Iran
- 2017 Tehran attacks
