= Bahrain–Iran relations =

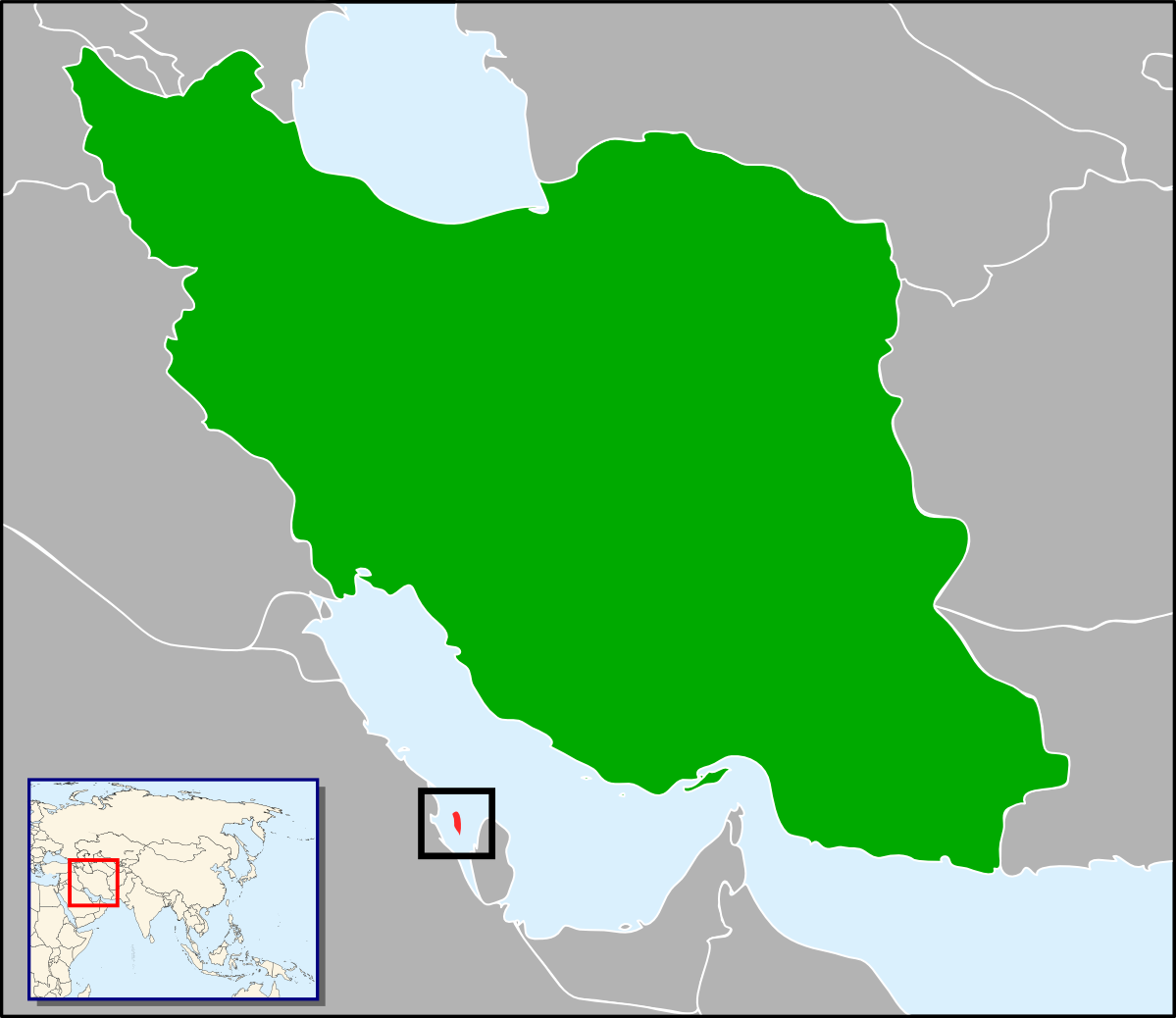

- Bahrain: Iran

Bilateral relations exist between the countries of Bahrain and Iran. Since the 1979 Iranian Revolution, relations between the two countries have been strained over various geopolitical issues such as the interpretations of Islam and relations with the United States, Europe, and other Western countries. In addition, Iran has been severely critical of Bahrain for hosting the United States Fifth Fleet within the Persian Gulf at the Naval Support Activity Bahrain base.

After the Saudi diplomatic missions in Iran were ransacked by Iranian protesters following the execution of Nimr al-Nimr, Bahrain followed Saudi Arabia's decision by severing diplomatic relations with Iran on 4 January 2016. On 16 April 2019, a court in Bahrain sentenced 139 people to prison for forming terrorist groups backed by Iran. A total of 169 were arrested.

== Relations under the Pahlavi dynasty ==
In 1957 Iran's parliament passed a bill declaring that Bahrain is the fourteenth province of Iran. Iran had a claim to Bahrain until March 1970 when Shah Mohammad Reza Pahlavi abandoned the claim. The 1970 Bahraini independence survey administered by the UN found that the majority of the Bahraini population, including both Sunni and Shia Muslims, favored independence. Following this realignment of policy, the two countries signed a demarcation agreement in 1970.

== Relations under the Islamic republic ==
Following the Iranian Revolution in which Ayatollah Khomeini came to power in Iran in 1979, Iran made clear its intention to export its Islamic revolution throughout the Muslim world, especially in the Arab world.

Two years later, Bahraini Shia fundamentalists orchestrated a revolution attempt under the auspices of a front organization, the Islamic Front for the Liberation of Bahrain. The revolution, which failed, would have installed a Shia cleric in Iran, Hujjat al-Islam Hādī al-Mudarrisī, as the Supreme Leader of Bahrain with a theocratic government. The Bahraini government unofficially regarded the coup as Iran attempting to overthrow their Sunni government. Iran denied any involvement, saying they were inspired by the Iranian revolution but had received no support from Iran. Fearful of a recurrence, Bahrain cracked down on its Shia population, putting thousands into jail and further souring relations with Iran.

The 1981 Bahraini coup attempt orchestrated by the Islamic Front for the Liberation of Bahrain (IFLB) was significantly influenced by transnational Shia networks established by Iranian clerics, including Grand Ayatollah Mohammad Taqi al-Modarresi. Al-Modarresi, a prominent Shia marja', played a pivotal role in establishing and nurturing Shia political activism across the Gulf region. Through his leadership, the Risali Movement aimed to empower Shia communities and challenge Sunni-dominated regimes, including Bahrain's Al Khalifa family. The IFLB's attempt to overthrow the Bahraini monarchy and install an Islamic republic mirrored Iran's broader strategy to export its revolutionary ideals and assert influence in neighbouring Bahrain. Although Iran officially denied direct involvement, the coup attempt highlighted the effectiveness of Iran's use of religious and political networks to advance its geopolitical objectives in the Persian Gulf.

In November 2007, President Mahmoud Ahmadinejad of Iran made his first official visit to Bahrain and met with King Hamad bin Isa Al Khalifa. Ahmadinejad discussed future agreements to supply Bahrain with natural gas during his meeting with the king and Bahraini officials. Iran and Bahrain are beginning to enjoy closer relations again and have engaged in many joint economic ventures.

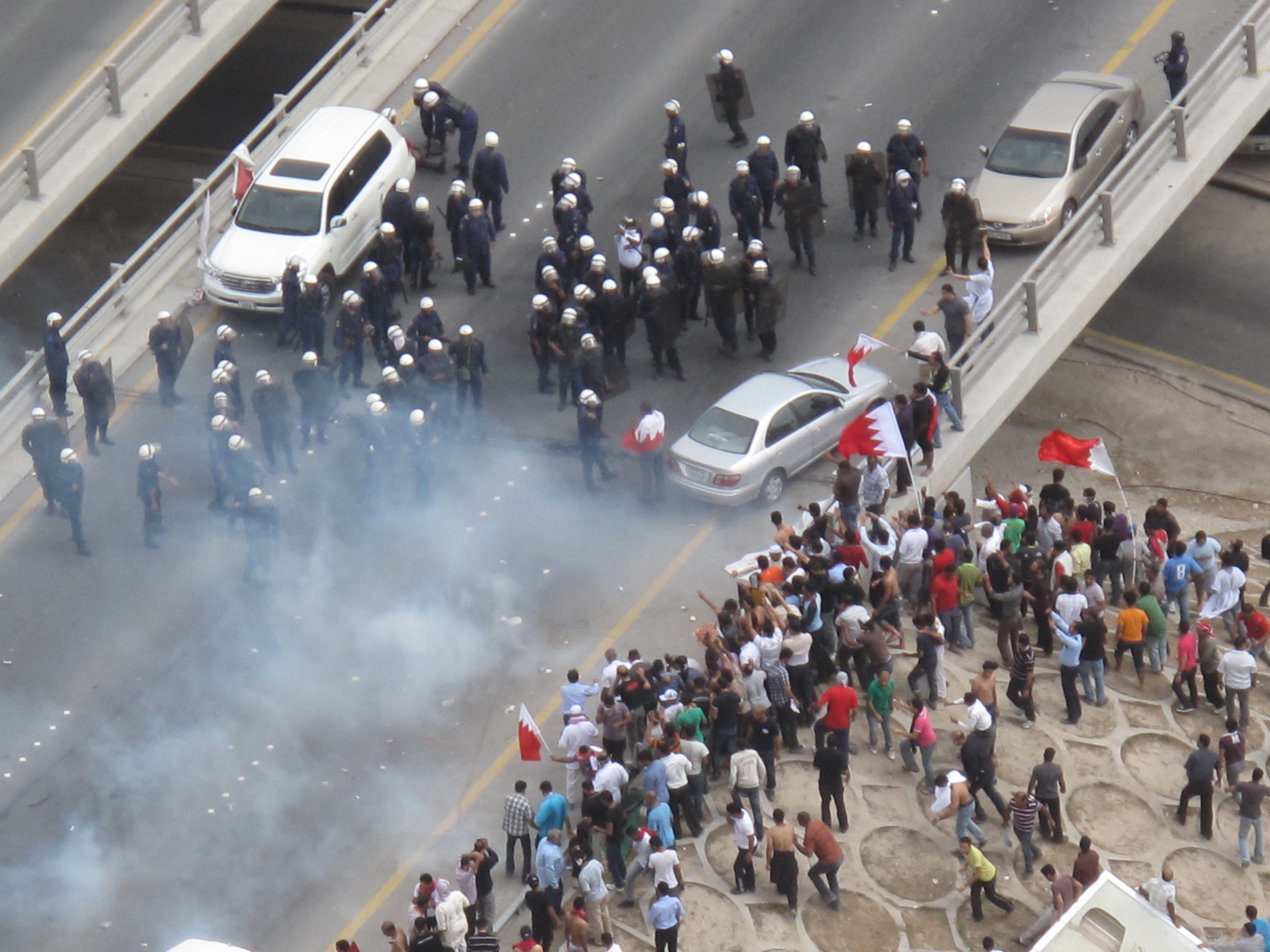
March 2011 protests in Bahrain

In the aftermath of the March 2011 protests in Bahrain, Iran expressed strong support for the demonstrators, a majority of whom followed Shia Islam, which is Iran's state religion. Relations between Tehran and Manama cooled considerably during the uprising, with both countries expelling one another's ambassadors. Iran was joined by Iraq in opposing the Gulf Cooperation Council's military intervention in Bahrain. Allies of the Bahraini government, such as Saudi Arabia and other GCC member states, have conversely blamed Iran for inciting upheaval in the small archipelago country and questioned the legitimacy of the protesters' demands, echoing Manama's claims.

On 12 August 2012, Foreign Minister of Bahrain Sheikh Khalid al-Khalifa announced from his Twitter account that Bahrain had reinstated its ambassador to Iran, nearly 18 months after relations between the two countries were strained following the 2011 Bahrain protests.

On 19 July 2015, after Supreme Leader Ali Khamenei voiced support for the oppressed people across the Middle East, including Bahrain, the Iranian acting chargé d'affaires Morteza Sanubari was summoned by the Foreign Minister of Bahrain over "flagrant interference". The foreign minister handed "an official protest memorandum" to the diplomat over "statements made by Ali Khamenei against the Kingdom of Bahrain".

On 13 August 2015, the Bahrain Interior Ministry announced arresting of five members of a terrorist group which was linked to at least one bombing attack in Sitra and was believed to accept aid and training from Lebanese militant group Hezbollah and Iran's Islamic Revolutionary Guard Corps (IRGC).

On 1 October 2015 (a week after the 2015 Mina stampede), the Bahraini government recalled its ambassador from Tehran and ordered the Iranian acting chargé d'affaires to leave the country within 3 days in response to "continuing interference by Iran in the affairs of the kingdom". This comes after Bahraini authorities in Nuwaidrat (30 September) discovered a large bomb-making factory and seized a large stash of weapons and arrested a number of people suspected of having links with Iran's Revolutionary Guards. Bahrain's decision to recall its ambassador comes "in light of continued Iranian meddling in the affairs of the kingdom of Bahrain ... in order to create sectarian strife and to impose hegemony and control. In response (on 2 October), the Iranian Foreign Ministry retaliated by releasing this statement: "The number two official in Bahrain's embassy in Tehran is persona non grata and Mr. Bassam al-Dossari must leave Iran's territory within 72 hours," the official IRNA news agency quoted a foreign ministry statement as saying late Friday. Often, Bahrain alleges that Iran is responsible for the protests among its Shia population, according to Aljazeera.

According to the Guardian, sometimes the Bahraini government tells visitors from the U.S confidentially, that Iran backs some Shi’a oppositionists.

== Relations following 2016 attack on the Saudi diplomatic missions in Iran ==
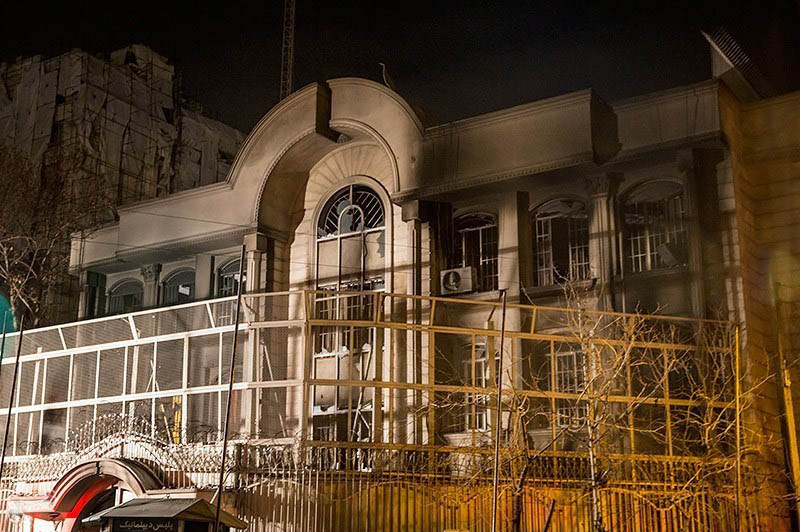
The Saudi embassy in Tehran after the attack

Following the 2016 attack on the Saudi diplomatic missions in Iran, the Foreign Minister of Bahrain "strongly condemned the two terrorist attacks on the Embassy of the Kingdom of Saudi Arabia in Tehran and its consulate in Mashhad in the Islamic Republic of Iran." In a statement, it said that "these demagogic and barbarian acts represent flagrant violation to the international convictions and norms, and the Vienna Convention which all safeguard the security and protection to the diplomatic missions."

On 4 January 2016, Bahrain severed diplomatic ties with Iran, accusing it of interference in Saudi internal affairs after Saudi Arabia executed prominent Shia cleric Nimr al-Nimr for his involvement in 2011–12 Saudi Arabian protests. This was followed by the same decision of the Saudi government.

On 9 January 2016, Bahrain's national airline Gulf Air announced that it would suspend flights between Bahrain International Airport and Tehran Imam Khomeini International Airport on 14 January. Mohammad Khodakarami, the deputy for aviation and international affairs of Iran's Civil Aviation Organization (CAO), has been quoted in state media as saying that Gulf Air made the announcement through a letter to Iran's Civil Aviation Organization. Khodakarami said that the airline's flights will remain suspended until further notice.

=== 2022 FIFA World Cup qualification ===
In the 2022 World Cup qualifiers, Bahrain was grouped together with Iran. Many Bahrainis took an interest in the encounter due to tensions between Bahrain and Iran. At the first match between Bahrain and Iran in the Bahraini capital, Manama, Bahrain supporters booed and whistled during the Iranian anthem and jeered the Iranian players. FIFA later fined Bahrain for the incident. The match ended with a shock historic 1–0 win for Bahrain, the first time in 10 years that Bahrain beat Iran.

=== Bahrain's peace treaty with Israel ===
On 11 September 2020, Bahrain announced it would establish official ties with Israel through the US-led Abraham Accords. The surprising normalisation attempt by Bahrain prompted anger from the Iranian leadership, as many Iranian officials openly denounced the deal and accused Bahrain of working with Zionist groups.

=== Renewed territorial claim from Iran ===
Amidst public unrest across Iran related to the death of Mahsa Amini, Iranian government has begun laying claims around Bahrain with a revisionist aim, denying Bahrain's rights to exist, a move which was seen by Bahrain as a clear threat to its sovereignty.

=== Return to diplomatic relations ===
After Iran and Saudi Arabia agreed to re-establish relations, the U.S. Assistant Secretary of State for Near Eastern Affairs Barbara Leaf told lawmakers, "I think [Bahrain-Iranian diplomatic normalization] will happen sometime soon."

== Revocation of Isa Qassim's citizenship ==
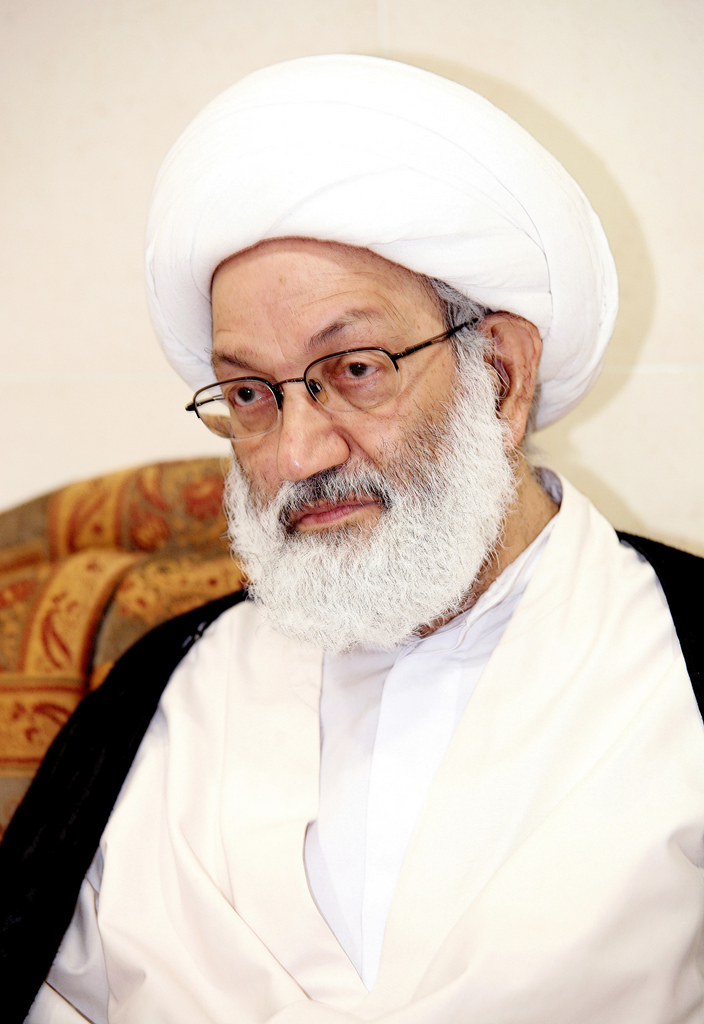
Isa Qassim pictured in 2007

On 20 June 2016, Isa Qassim was stripped of his Bahraini citizenship. An interior ministry statement accused Sheikh Isa Qassim of using his position to "serve foreign interests" and promote "sectarianism and violence". Announcing the move to strip him of his Bahraini citizenship, the interior ministry said the cleric had "adopted theocracy and stressed the absolute allegiance to the clergy". It added that he had been in continuous contact with "organizations and parties that are enemies of the kingdom". Bahrain's citizenship law allows for the cabinet to revoke the citizenship of anyone who "causes harm to the interests of the kingdom or behaves in a way inimical with the duty of loyalty to it".

=== Iranian reactions ===
- The Supreme Leader of Iran, Ali Khamenei, said in a speech carried by state media, "This is blatant foolishness and insanity. When he still could address the Bahraini people, Sheikh Isa Qassim would advise against radical and armed actions" and "Attacking Sheikh Isa Qassim means removing all obstacles blocking heroic Bahraini youths from attacking the regime".
- Ali Larijani, Speaker of the Iranian parliament condemned the action, saying "this was an impolitic and quite an adventurous move by the Bahraini regime which assumed that by revoking the nationality of this prominent spiritual leader, it could lead the country’s domestic political crisis toward tranquility" and "the Al-Khalifa regime (Persian: رژیم آل خلیفه) must take a careful look at this historical record that clearly shows once a government starts threatening the influential figures of its nation with revocation of citizenship, it is taking its last breaths".
- In a statement published by Fars News Agency, Major-General Qasem Soleimani, commander of the Islamic Revolutionary Guard Corps Quds Force said: "The Al Khalifa (Persian: آل خلیفه) [rulers of Bahrain] surely know their aggression against Sheikh Isa Qassim is a red line that crossing it would set Bahrain and the whole region on fire, and it would leave no choice for people but to resort to armed resistance. The Al Khalifa regime will definitely pay the price for that and their blood-thirsty regime will be toppled."

== 2026 Iranian strikes on Bahrain ==
In 2026, Iran fired missiles and drones at Gulf states including Bahrain, as part of the Iran-Israel-United States conflict. Bahrain's air defenses intercepted approximately 70 missiles and 59 drones by 3 March, according to official reports. Bahrain condemned the strikes as a violation of its sovereignty and international law. The strikes damaged military sites, including the U.S. Fifth Fleet headquarters. Civilian sites, including The Crowne Plaza Hotel, an apartment complex, and Bahrain International Airport, were also affected, resulting in injuries and the death of at least one foreign worker. An Iranian drone damaged a desalination plant in Bahrain. On May 24 nine men were sentences by the Bahrain court to life in prison, while two others were sentenced to three years in prison. This came after earlier in May, Bahrain security forces arrested 41 men for involvement in "hostile and terrorist acts" against Bahrain, collaborating with the IRGC during the Iranian attacks on Bahrain.

=== 2026 Iranian strikes on (U.S. bases) in Bahrain ===
The Islamic Republic of Iran's army mentioned in a statement that the army's drone attacks were on American centers and bases in Bahrain. In a statement, the Islamic Republic of Iran announced the purpose of these attacks as a response to the enemy's hostile actions in targeting urban infrastructure and people. In the eleventh phase of Operation Saeeqah, the Islamic Republic of Iran's army targeted the location of US Army helicopters and P8 reconnaissance aircraft at the Sakhir base in Bahrain with Arash drone attacks.

Iran also announced that it had attack(s) on US military fuel tanks in Bahrain. In July, 2026, The Islamic Republic of Iran's army's destructive drones targeted "electricity generators," "navigation systems," and "administrative and support buildings" of the US military at the Sheikh Isa base in Bahrain. Also, according to an Iranian News Agency (Mehr), satellite images show damage to the drone command and control center at the US Fifth Fleet base in Bahrain following Iran's retaliatory response against the source of aggression in the region.

On 21 November, the Islamic Revolutionary Guard Corps of Iran reported that it had carried out strikes against US air-defence radar installations at the Riffa and Awali air bases in Bahrain.

== See also ==
- Iran–Saudi Arabia relations
- Iran-Saudi Arabia proxy conflict
