= Ghaffar Djalal =

Iranian diplomat

Ghafar Jalal ol-Saltaneh

Iranian ambassador to Sweden
- In office 1921–1922
- Preceded by: Assad Khan Assad Bahador
- Succeeded by: Hassan Arfa

Iranian ambassador to Egypt
- In office 1924 to – 1928
- Preceded by: Fethullah Khan Amirarafi
- Succeeded by: Javad Sinki

Iranian ambassador to Italy
- In office 1928–1930
- Preceded by: Mostafa Safala al-Malmak
- Succeeded by: Abol Qasem Amid

Iranian ambassador to the United States
- In office June 12, 1933 – November 27, 1935
- Preceded by: Yadollah Azodi
- Succeeded by: Hossein Ghods-Nachai

Personal details
- Born: 1 January 1882
- Died: 31 December 1948 (aged 66)

Ghaffar Jalal (Persian: غفار جلال علاء, was an Iranian diplomat.

== Career ==
From 1907 to 1920 he was secretary in the Persian Legation in London while his uncle Mehdi Ala al-Saltaneh was Persian minister to the Court of St James's there.

From 1921 to 1922 he was minister in Stockholm. From 1924 to 1928 he was minister in Cairo. From 1928 to 1930 he was minister in Rome. From 1930 to June 12, 1933 he headed the English Section of the Ministry for Foreign Affairs. On June 12, 1933, he was accredited by Franklin D. Roosevelt. On Nowruz 1935, the diplomatic corps in Tehran was informed that the official name of Persia from now on was Iran.

== Arrest of the Iranian envoy ==
On November 27, 1935, after a dispute with the traffic police, he was handcuffed and detained in defiance of his diplomatic immunity. He was on his way back from New York City to Washington, D.C., when his chauffeur exceeded the speed limit within the city limits of Elkton, Maryland, the diplomat was arrested by American police authorities and the resulting arguments and recriminations were reported by the newspapers of both countries. Iranian interests were taken care of by the Turkish legation.
