= Iran–Saudi Arabia relations =

- Iran: Saudi Arabia

Diplomatic mission
- Iranian Embassy, Riyadh: Saudi Arabian Embassy, Tehran

Envoy
- Ambassador Alireza Enayati: Ambassador Abdullah bin Saud al-Anzi

Bilateral relations between Iran and Saudi Arabia have experienced periods of tension as well as phases of diplomatic engagement and normalization. The tensions have been attributed to a range of geopolitical issues, including regional influence, oil production policies, and differing relationships with the United States and other Western countries. Diplomatic relations were suspended from 1987 to 1990, and they were more recently suspended from 2016 to 2023 again following certain issues like the intervention in Yemen, Iran embassy bombing in Yemen, incidents during the 2015 Hajj, the execution of Nimr al-Nimr, and the attack on the Saudi diplomatic missions in Iran. However, in March 2023, after discussions brokered by China, Iran and Saudi Arabia agreed to reestablish relations. In October 2024, Saudi Arabia and Iran made efforts to improve their relations. In a meeting in Doha, Qatar, Iranian President Masoud Pezeshkian and Saudi Arabia’s Foreign Minister Faisal bin Farhan Al Saud discussed the promotion of bilateral ties, Israeli attacks on Gaza and Lebanon, and Iran’s retaliatory attacks on Israel. The two sides emphasized the need to set aside their differences and work towards the expansion of relations.

Saudi Arabia is an absolute monarchy established in 1932 and has maintained close strategic relations with the United States and the United Kingdom since the post-World War II period.. Iran's government alternated between absolute monarchy and increasing parliamentarianism, until the 1953 Iranian coup d'état increased Mohammad Reza Pahlavi's powers as monarch within a parliamentary system. The coup was supported by the army, the bazaar, the clerics, the United States and the United Kingdom. Both states were aligned with the Western Bloc in the Cold War against the Soviet Union, until the end of formal Iran-United States relations in 1980 following the Iranian Revolution. Throughout both the Cold War and the war on terror, the United States has continued to pursue a strategic relationship with Saudi Arabia.

Both countries are major oil and gas exporters and have clashed over energy policy. Saudi Arabia, with its large oil reserves and smaller population, has a greater interest in taking a long-term view of the global oil market and incentive to moderate prices. In contrast, Iran is compelled to focus on high prices in the short term due to its low standard of living given recent sanctions after its decade-old war with Saddam Hussein's Iraq and its larger population.

In the Syrian civil war, Iran has supported the Syrian government militarily and with billions of dollars of aid, while Saudi Arabia was a major supplier of aid to rebel groups. Both governments have accused each other of supporting militant or extremist groups. Iran and Saudi Arabia have competing interests in the battle for dominance over their region.

As of 2026, the relationship between the two countries became once again strained and hostile following 2026 Iranian strikes on Saudi Arabia as part of 2026 Iran war which also targeted oil refineries and civil infrastructures inside Saudi Arabia.

== Tensions ==
After the Iranian Revolution, relations deteriorated considerably after Iran accused Saudi Arabia of aligning itself with the United States in the Persian Gulf region, representing U.S. interests rather than what it perceived to be those of the Muslim world. Saudi Arabia is concerned by Iran's consistent desire to export its revolution across the Persian Gulf region—notably in post-Saddam Iraq, the Levant, and further south. It is also opposed to Iran's controversial nuclear program.

Tensions between the two countries have waxed and waned. Relations between Saudi Arabia and Iran soured particularly after the Iranian Revolution, the commencement of the Iranian nuclear program, the 2011 alleged Iran assassination plot and the 2016 execution of Nimr al-Nimr. There have also been numerous attempts to improve the relationship. After the 1991 Gulf War there was a noticeable thaw in relations. In March 2007, President Ahmadinejad of Iran visited Riyadh and was greeted at the airport by King Abdullah, and the two countries were referred to in the press as "brotherly nations".

Since March 2011, the Syrian Civil War has also been a source of tension. Iran has provided financial and military support for the Syrian government, led by Bashar al-Assad, while Saudi Arabia has supported Syrian rebels, as well as Al Qaeda and ISIS even.

On 3 January 2016, Saudi Arabia's embassy in Tehran, Iran was ransacked following the execution of Saudi-born Shia Islam cleric Nimr al-Nimr. The execution prompted widespread condemnation within the Arab World and by other countries, the European Union, and the United Nations, with protests being carried out in cities in Iran, Iraq, Lebanon, Pakistan, and Turkey. Following the attack on its embassy in Iran, Saudi Arabia broke diplomatic relations with Iran and the Saudi foreign minister said that all Iranian diplomats were to leave the country within 48 hours. For a long time now, Iran has wanted to be more involved in the affairs of the Middle East, including sharing benefits and responsibilities of being a dominant power in the region.

The difference in political ideologies and governing structures has also divided both countries. The Islamic Republic of Iran is based on the principle of Guardianship of the Islamic Jurist, which holds that a faqīh (Islamic jurist) should have custodianship over all Muslim followers, including over traditional governors, such as monarchs, and regardless of nationality. Iran's Supreme Leader is a Shia faqīh. The leader of the 1979 Iranian revolution, Ayatollah Khomeini, was ideologically opposed to monarchy, which he believed to be un-Islamic. Saudi Arabia's monarchy, on the other hand, remains consistently conservative, and non-revolutionary. The king is politically tied to traditional religious leaders of the Arab tribes who support the monarchy and the king in his capacity as the Custodian of the Two Holy Mosques, and is thus given absolute obedience as long as he does not violate Islamic sharia law. However, Saudi Arabia has a Shia minority which has made bitter complaints of institutional discrimination against it. Sometimes, it has gone as far as to call for the abolition of the monarchy. Another source of disagreement is the U.S. sanctions on Iran which have destroyed Iran's oil industry.

== History ==
=== 1920s–1970s: during Pahlavi Era ===
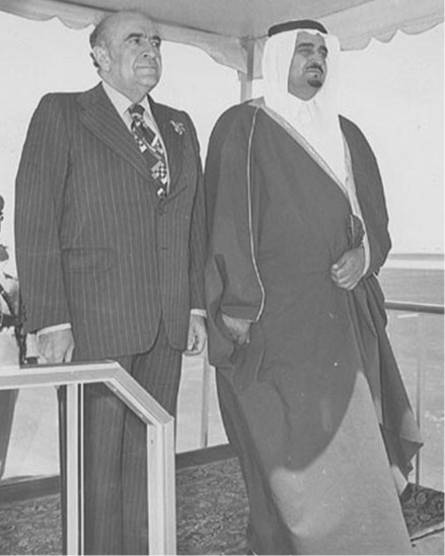
Iranian Prime Minister Amir-Abbas Hoveyda and Crown Prince Fahd of Saudi Arabia in Tehran, July 1975

Saudi Arabia and Iran established diplomatic relations in 1929 following the signing of a Saudi-Iranian Friendship Treaty. Relations continued until 1943 when an Iranian pilgrim, Abu Taleb Yazdi, was accused of attempting to throw his vomit on the Kaaba, and was executed by the Saudi government. Relations were severed as a result in 1944. In 1946 Ibn Saud sent a letter to the Shah to resume the relations which restarted the connections.

However, relations were not active until the 1960s mostly due to differences in religious practices and Iran's recognition of Israel. In 1966 King Faisal of Saudi Arabia visited Iran with the aim of further strengthening relationships between both neighboring countries. The Shah of Iran Mohammad Reza Pahlavi reciprocated by paying an official visit to Saudi Arabia which eventually led to a peaceful resolution of the lands. Mohammad Reza supported Faisal's efforts regarding Islamic solidarity and actively contributed to the establishment of multinational Islamic institutions, including the Organization of the Islamic World Congress, the Muslim World League, and the Organization of the Islamic Conference.

In 1968, Saudi Arabia and Iran signed a demarcation agreement. When the United Kingdom announced it would withdraw and vacate the Persian Gulf in the late 1960s, Iran and Saudi Arabia took the primary responsibility for peace and security in the region. In the late 1960s, the Shah sent a series of letters to King Faisal, urging him to modernize Saudi Arabia, saying, "Please, my brother, modernize. Open up your country. Make the schools mixed women and men. Let women wear miniskirts. Have discos. Be modern. Otherwise I cannot guarantee you will stay on your throne." In response, King Faisal wrote, "Your majesty, I appreciate your advice. May I remind you, you are not the Shah of France. You are not in the Élysée. You are in Iran. Your population is 90 percent Muslim. Please don't forget that."

During the 1970s, Saudi Arabia's main concerns over Iran were firstly, Iran's modernisation of its military and its military dominance all over the region; secondly, Iran's repossession of the islands of Big Tunb, Little Tunb and Abu Musa in 1971 which challenged the claim of the United Arab Emirates over the islands. The dispute remains till today. But the relationship between Iran and Saudi Arabia was never as friendly as between the years 1968 and 1979.

The relationship between the two countries was not without its tensions in the mid-to-late 1970s. As the Shah attempted to build an Iranian security architecture in the region, the Saudis resisted these efforts. Instead, King Khalid attempted to build bilaterial security relationships with the smaller neighboring Persian Gulf states which has lasted till today. The Saudis also argued for more modest OPEC price increases in 1976 and 1977 than Iran wanted.

=== 1979: Iranian Revolution ===
Following the theocratic Iranian Revolution led by Khomeini in 1979, Iran started to openly attack and criticise the character and religious legitimacy of the Saudi regime. However King Khalid, the then ruler of Saudi Arabia, sent Khomeini a congratulatory message, stating that "Islamic solidarity" could be the basis for closer relations of the two countries. He also argued that with the foundation of the Islamic Republic in Iran there were no obstacles that inhibited the cooperation between two countries.

After the 1987 Mecca incident, in a public address in 1987 Khomeini declared that "these vile and ungodly Wahhabis, are like daggers which have always pierced the heart of the Muslims from the back", and announced that Mecca was in the hands of "a band of heretics." Upon this statement diplomatic relations between the two countries ended until 1991.

=== 1980s: Iraqi invasion of Iran ===
The Shia–Sunni conflict between the two countries also played a pivotal role in the Iran–Iraq War when Saudi authorities pledged US$25 billion of aid to the Iraqi government of Saddam Hussein. The Iraqi invasion of Iran increased Saudi concerns over stability in the region, hence their financial support to Iraq regardless of the "not-so-warm" relations between Baathist Iraq and conservative Saudi Arabia. In doing so, Saudi Arabia recognised its worries that revolutionary Iran was a far greater threat to its survival and the stability of the region. Saudi Arabia encouraged other Sunni Monarchs of Arab states of the Persian Gulf, including Kuwait, Bahrain, Qatar and the United Arab Emirates, to do the same by giving financial support to Iraq. To cover the costs of the war Saudi Arabia dramatically increased its oil production. This increase in oil production by Saudi Arabia was aimed to weaken Iran's ability to fund its campaigns. However, this measure by Saudi Arabia also cost the Saudi government billions in revenue as oil prices plunged from over $30 a barrel to less than $15 by the mid-1980s.

During the Iran–Iraq War, Iran flew their aircraft in Saudi airspace and also threatened Saudi Arabia and Kuwait with severe consequences if they would not stop supporting Iraq. Unlike America, Saudi Arabia, due to its very traditional Arab-Bedouin culture, did not break diplomatic relations with Iran even during the worst periods of tension following the revolution and during the Iran–Iraq War.

==== 1984: Four Iranian F-4 warplanes penetrate Saudi airspace ====
On 7 May 1984 Iranian warplanes targeted an oil tanker in the Persian Gulf. This action resulted in Saudi Arabia undertaking air defensive measurements in the region to intercept Iranian warplanes. On 5 June 1984 two Iranian F-4 warplanes penetrated Saudi airspace, reportedly to bomb oil tankers. Saudi F-15 Eagles intercepted the Iranian warplanes, and shot down both F-4s.

==== 1987 Hajj incident ====
Until 1987, no satisfactory resolution was made to decrease the tension between Iran and Saudi Arabia. The already strained relationship between the two countries further deteriorated when clashes occurred between Iranian-led demonstrators and Saudi security forces on 31 July 1987. The clash claimed the lives of around 400 pilgrims, out of which the majority had Iranian nationality. Angry protesters in Tehran responded by ransacking the Saudi embassy and reportedly detained four Saudis from the embassy. In response, Saudi Arabia reduced the number of Iranian pilgrims permitted on the Hajj, then cut its diplomatic relations with Iran on 27 April 1988. In response, the Iranian government boycotted the Hajj for three years, saying that Saudi Arabia was preventing pilgrims from going on the Hajj. The diplomatic relations between Iran and Saudi Arabia were not restored for three years after this incident.

==== Post Iran–Iraq War ====
In October 1988, the late King Fahd halted all media campaigns against Iran and asked Saudi administration to pressure Iraq into implementing the UNSCR 598, which called for an immediate ceasefire between Iran and Iraq. In 1989, Iranian President Hashemi Rafsanjani stated that Iran and Saudi Arabia were holding indirect talks to improve their relations.

==== Responses to Satanic Verses ====
Ayatollah Khomeini, the spiritual leader of Iran at that time, declared a death sentence for Salman Rushdie for certain anti-Islamic remarks in his book The Satanic Verses published in 1988. The Saudi government came up with a different verdict of making Rushdie appear before an Islamic tribunal before he could be delivered a death sentence.

=== 1990s ===
==== Iraqi invasion of Kuwait on 2 August 1990 ====
When Iraq invaded Kuwait in 1990, Iran criticised and condemned the invasion. This stance from Iran, in favor of the Kuwaitis, and the anti-Iraqi coalition of the Persian Gulf states helped to improve relations between Iran and the GCC, namely Saudi Arabia. Both Iran and Saudi Arabia rejected the use of force as a solution to regional problems and opposed the invasion of Kuwait by Iraq. Iran went further, by backing UN sanctions against Iraq. Iran viewed the Iraqi occupation of Kuwait as a serious threat, considering it the first step towards its expansionist mindset. During the war, relations between Iran and Saudi Arabia thawed considerably and the official ties were restored in 1991.

This short resumption of political ties was followed by quick high level visits, notably, in April 1991, Iranian Foreign Minister Ali Akbar Velayati visited Saudi Arabia to propose an Iranian-Gulf Cooperation Council alliance with a mandate for the security of the Persian Gulf, during a meeting with the late King Fahd. He claimed the Gulf Cooperation Council was too weak and hence failed to prevent the invasion of Kuwait, and stressed the need of the inclusion of Iran to strengthen such a regional agency to ensure stability.

The Hajj (Pilgrimage) issue was also resolved. In 1991, the Saudi authorities allowed 115,000 Iranian pilgrims, which was more in number compared to the 1988 quota of 45,000, that had led to Iran's abrupt boycott. These included 5,000 relatives of the "martyrs" of the 1987 incident. In later years, Iran adopted a careful approach and undertook measures for preventing a repeat of that incident. Iranian authorities tried to discourage large demonstrations by its pilgrims and attempted to have them held within the confines of the Iranian encampment, due to the fact that certain Iranian Shi'ite rituals are not accepted by other sects of Islam, and could have endangered the lives of Iranian Pilgrims if conducted openly.

==== Khobar Towers bombing ====
On 23 June 1996, a massive truck bomb exploded near U.S. military barracks in Dhahran, Saudi Arabia, killing nineteen U.S. servicemen and wounding hundreds. The US government held Iran responsible for the attack. The charges against Iran, however, remained unconfirmed, and therefore did not substantively affect the Iranian–Saudi relations.

==== 1997 OIC meeting ====
The 1997 meeting of the Organisation of the Islamic Conference (OIC) in Iran heralded a shift in the attitude of the Arab States towards Iran. Several Arab countries confirmed their commitment to the conference. Saudi Arabia, which was previously criticized by Iran because of its control over the main Islamic holy cities of Mecca and Medina and also because of its perceived reliance on the United States for security, also participated in the meeting. At the OIC summit meeting, Saudi Arabia was represented by Crown Prince Abdullah (later King) and its Minister of Foreign affairs Saud Al Faisal. Saudi participation proved helpful in the process of further reconciliation between Iran and Saudi Arabia. As a result, Saudi ministerial delegations visited Iran and later on, the official visit of President Mohammad Khatami to Saudi Arabia took place in February 1998.

This was the first visit by an Iranian President to Saudi Arabia after the 1979 Iranian Revolution. The aim was to address pressing economic issues of the time. Iran was looking for a reallocation of OPEC (Organization of the Petroleum Exporting Countries) producing quotas to which it required strong support from Saudi Arabia. It was also reported that Iran was trying to persuade Saudi Arabia to consider exporting the Iranian Infrastructure to Central Asia. Iran also expected that the issue of the regional security alliance would be raised in which the alliance for the security of the region could be made to ensure stability on both borders of the Persian Gulf.

A Comprehensive Cooperation Agreement was signed between Saudi Arabia and Iran in May 1998, in which both countries agreed to cooperate in the field of economics, culture and sports. The relationship between Saudi Arabia and Iran was further improved when Khatami, the then President of Iran, on his tour to neighboring Arab countries, visited Saudi Arabia in May 1999. President Khatami stayed for five days in Saudi Arabia in which various discussions were held between the heads of both countries. Discussions included Persian Gulf security, efforts to increase global oil prices, the situation in Iraq and the development of a common geo-strategic approach to regional issues. The partial détente between Iran and the USA encouraged Saudi Arabia to apply more cooperation with President Khatami. In addition to this, Saudi Arabia and Iran signed an agreement known as the Saudi-Iranian security agreement in April 2001.

In July 1999, the late King Fahd of Saudi Arabia urged other Persian Gulf countries to improve their relations with Iran. King Fahd of Saudi Arabia, speaking at the opening session of the Shura Council said that it was in the interest of all the countries of the Persian Gulf to improve relations with Iran. He further said that all the other countries should follow Saudi Arabia's lead. These improved relations between Saudi Arabia and Iran also brought criticism from the United Arab Emirates, which criticised Saudi Arabia for abandoning UAE in its territorial disputes with Iran over three strategic Islands.

=== 2000s ===
==== Yemen ====
Iran and Saudi Arabia support different sides in the Yemeni Civil War, with Saudi Arabia supporting the Yemeni government while Iran supports the Houthi rebels. Iran has heavily criticized Saudi Arabia for their intervention in the Houthi insurgency in Yemen. In 2017 Saudi Prince Mohammed bin Salman called the supreme leader of Iran "new Hitler".

==== 2003 Riyadh bombings ====
Adel al-Jubeir, the foreign minister of Saudi Arabia, stated in one of his articles that Al-Qaeda's chief of operations "Saif al-Adel placed a call from Iran in May 2003 giving orders for the Riyadh bombings that claimed more than 30 lives, including eight Americans. Yet he still benefits from Iranian protection."

=== 2010s ===
==== Yemeni crisis standoff ====
Two Iranian officers were captured in Yemeni city of Aden during the fighting between local militia and Houthis. According to local pro-Saudi militia they served as military advisors to Houthis and were connected with Iranian Quds Force. Further worsening of bilateral relationship between Iran and Saudi Arabia is generally expected as both countries are involved intensively in Yemeni crisis.

==== Leaked diplomatic cables ====
In November 2010, leaked diplomatic cables revealed that King Abdullah urged the US to attack Iran to destroy its nuclear weapons programme, describing Iran as a snake whose head should be cut off without any procrastination. The documents were dismissed by Iranian president Mahmoud Ahmadinejad, claiming them to be "organised to be released on a regular basis."

==== 2011 Iran assassination plot ====
On 11 October 2011, US accused Iran of planning to assassinate Adel Al-Jubair, the Saudi ambassador to the US.

==== Sanctions against Iran ====
In 2012, in response to the global sanctions against Iran, Saudi Arabia offered to offset the loss of Iranian oil sales and Iran warned against this. The same year Turki Al Faisal, former head of Saudi General Intelligence and a Saudi royal, suggested that Saudi Arabia would support the U.S.-led sanctions against Iranian oil.

==== Jeddah airport incident ====
In April 2015, media reported that two Iranian teenage pilgrims to Saudi Arabia had been sexually harassed by Saudi police at the Jeddah Airport. After that, 80 members of Iranian parliament presented a bill for minor Hajj rituals to be suspended until the Saudi officials guarantee the security of Iranian pilgrims and stop their harassment. Hundreds of Iranians protested outside Saudi Arabia's Embassy in Tehran over the alleged abuse of these two Iranian pilgrims in 11 April and clashed with police forces after trying to climb the embassy walls. In 8 April, Saudi authorities said they had prevented a plane carrying 260 Iranian pilgrims from landing in the kingdom, saying the airline operators had not applied for a permit to enter Saudi Arabia. In 13 April, Iran suspended minor hajj trips to Saudi Arabia until the Saudi government "applies a strong attitude" to the case.

Saud al-Faisal, foreign minister of Saudi Arabia have pledged to Iran's Ambassador that his government will punish the two Saudi policemen, very soon.

Mansour al-Turki, spokesman of Interior ministry of Saudi Arabia, informed that the accused airport staff members have been arrested and referred to court and Iranian ambassador to Saudi Arabia has been informed and the suspects have been referred for investigation.

==== 2015 "Saudileaks" ====
In late May 2015, Yemeni hacking group Yemen Cyber Army launched a cyber attack on Saudi Arabia's Foreign, Interior and Defense Ministries' website to gain a portion of classified information and top secret documents. The documents were related to the Saudi agenda in Iran. The documents were later listed on WikiLeaks. The agenda included propaganda to stir chaotic unrest in Iran with the help of opposition forces, social media, newspapers, magazines and websites, in order to pave the way for changing the Iranian political system.

Furthermore, a Saudi diplomat planned to use the Persian and Arabic-language media, also the Arab-speaking citizens of Southern and Western Iran for provoking mass protests in that region.

==== 2015 Hajj disaster ====
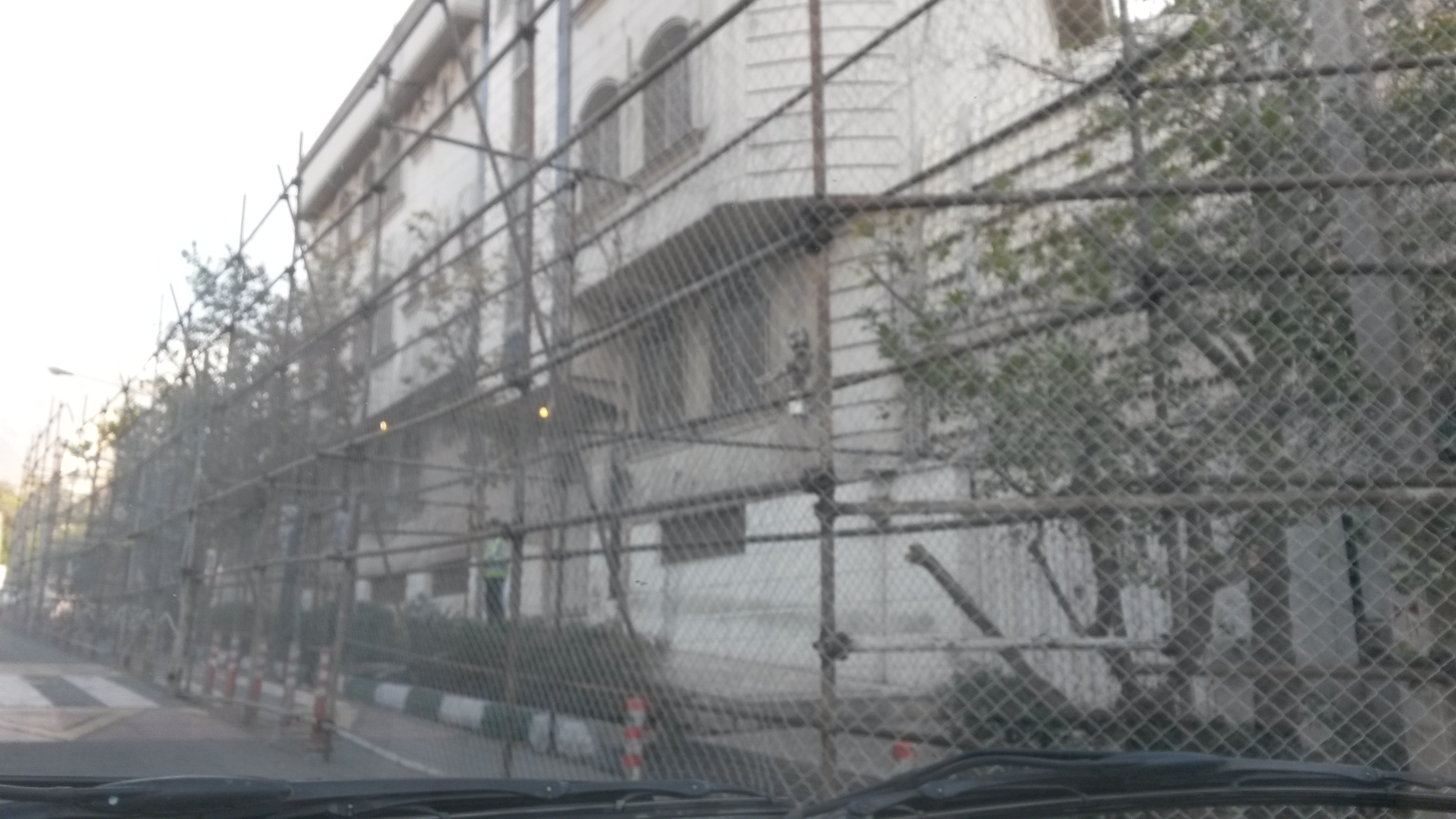
Embassy of Saudi Arabia in Tehran under Iranian police protection after the Mina disaster.

The 2015 Hajj disaster escalated tensions between Saudi Arabia and Iran due to the deaths of Iranian pilgrims in the stampede. Iranian leaders accused Saudi authorities of being responsible for the disaster. A Saudi Prince, Dr. Khalid bin Abdullah bin Fahd bin Farhan Al Saud tweeted that : "Under the threat of the enemy Zoroastrians — historically – to the Kingdom – it is time to think – seriously – to ban Iranians from coming to Mecca to preserve the safety of the pilgrims".

On 18 May 2025, it was reported that for the first time in a decade, Saudi Arabia will resume Hajj flights with Iran.

==== 2016 execution of Nimr al-Nimr ====
On 2 January 2016, 47 people were put to death in several Saudi cities, including prominent Shia cleric Nimr al-Nimr. Protesters of the executions responded by demonstrating in Iran's capital, Tehran. That same day a few protesters would eventually ransack the Saudi Embassy in Tehran and later set it ablaze. Police donned riot gear and arrested 40 people during the incident.

On 3 January 2016, Saudi Arabia's foreign ministry announced that it would cut diplomatic ties with Iran due to the violence that had occurred at their embassy. and President Rouhani called the damage on embassy "by no means justifiable".

After the events, Saudi Arabia refused to play in Iran during the 2016 AFC Champions League.

==== 2016 Iran embassy bombing in Yemen ====
On 7 January 2016, Iran's foreign ministry made the claim that Saudi warplanes had deliberately targeted its embassy to Yemen in the city of Sanaa. Iran's report included claims that,"a number of the building's guards" had been injured as a result of the bombing. Sanaa residents reported that the embassy's main building suffered no visible damage. General Ahmad Asseri from the Saudi-led coalition investigated Iran's allegations and announced that no evidence was found for the accusation neither by the Arab Coalition Military nor by the legitimate Yemeni government.

==== 2016 Iranian ban on the Hajj ====
In September 2016, following disputes, the Iranian government barred its citizens from making the Hajj. Iran claimed that the 2015 incident was the result of Saudi "incompetence." The Saudi government suggested that the move was politically motivated as a means to put pressure on the kingdom.

In the first week of January 2017, the Saudi Minister for Pilgrims invited more than 80 countries including Iran for Iranian participation in the forthcoming Hajj rituals. Iran has also confirmed the receipt of Saudi invitation and is willing to discuss arrangements for the 2017 Hajj season. The Iranian delegation is expected to travel to Saudi Arabia on 23 February 2017 to discuss the participation of Iranian pilgrims.

=== 2020s ===
The major general of Iranian Islamic Revolutionary Guard Corps (IRGC) Qasem Soleimani was assassinated in a targeted American drone strike on 3 January 2020 in Baghdad airport, when he was invited by Iraqi Prime Minister Adil Abdul-Mahdi as a mediator to talk about Iran's response to a previous message from Saudi Arabia.

In May 2015, classified Saudi government documents were leaked by Yemeni hackers uncovered that the Saudi Intelligence Agency was offering unsolicited aid to the United States which would hit "an efficient and preemptive blow" to IRGC commanders.

Since April 2021, Iraq has hosted five rounds of direct talks between the two nations, which cut diplomatic ties in 2016. The 6th round of talks on a ministerial level stalled, but after a meeting in Amman, Jordan, in December 2022, Iran's Hossein Amir-Abdollahian and Saudi Foreign Minister Prince Faisal bin Farhan Al Saud signaled that both countries would be "open to more dialogue". Despite increased rhetoric by Iran against Saudi Arabia, the Saudis support efforts to revive the stalled Iran nuclear deal. However, the Saudi minister said 'all bets off' if Iran would obtain nuclear weapons. In January 2023, the Saudi foreign ministers Al Saud speaking at a panel at the World Economic Forum in Davos reiterated that "Riyadh is trying to find a dialog with Iran". He welcomed the decision by Saudi Arabia and other Gulf states to focus on their economies "towards joint prosperity".

==== International efforts to normalize relations ====
There were international efforts going on to normalize the relations between two countries following the crisis which started with the execution of Sheikh Nimr. In 2016, Pakistan's prime minister Nawaz Sharif and Chief of Army Staff Raheel Sharif visited Riyadh and Tehran, following high level visits from Saudi Arabia to Islamabad.

Pakistan's opposition leader Imran Khan visited the embassies of Iran and Saudi Arabia and met their head of commissions in Islamabad on 8 January 2016 to understand their stance regarding the conflict. He urged the Government of Pakistan to play a positive role to resolve the matter between both countries.

Since April 2019, Iraq has offered to host the peace talks to reconcile Saudi Arabia and Iran to end the crisis in the region. The roundtable talks between the two nations began in 2021, although with varying results due to the two's reluctance. However, Iran suspended the peace talks with Saudi Arabia on 14 March 2022 without giving reasons.

On 26 May 2022, Iran's foreign minister, Hossein Amir-Abdollahian, stated that the country has made "minimal but good progress" in its relations with Saudi Arabia.

==== 2023 restoration of relations ====
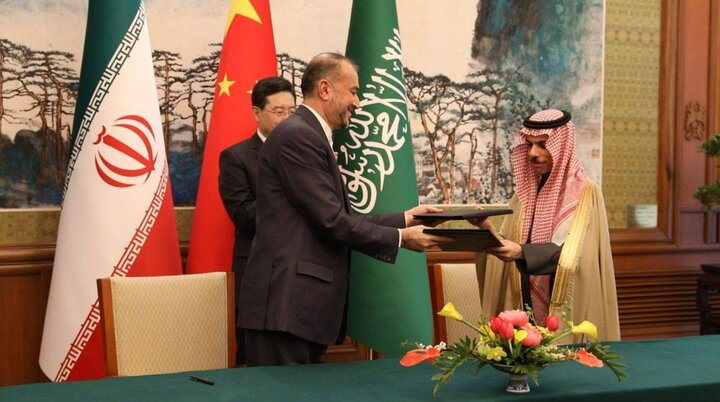
Iranian Foreign Minister Hossein Amir-Abdollahian and Saudi Foreign Minister Faisal bin Farhan Al Saud after signing a joint statement on the restoration of diplomatic relations, with Chinese Foreign Minister Qin Gang in the background, 6 April 2023

The two countries announced the resumption of relations on 10 March 2023, following a deal brokered by China. The deal followed several days of secret talks in Beijing by Iranian and Saudi officials. The agreement was signed by secretary of the Supreme National Security Council of Iran Ali Shamkhahni and Saudi Arabian national security advisor Musaed Al-Aiban. A joint statement announced that their embassies would re-open within two months. The path to the agreement was paved by five rounds of reconciliation talks that had been hosted by Iraq over several years. The agreement was welcomed by the United States, the United Nations Secretary General, Hezbollah, Oman, UAE, Egypt, Pakistan, Indonesia and Malaysia. Two former Israeli Prime Ministers, Naftali Bennett and Yair Lapid, criticized the agreement.

Under the deal, the countries would restore agreements related to security, trade, and culture. Under the agreement both countries agree to respect the other's sovereignty and not interfere in the internal affairs of the other.

Following the reconciliation deal, Iranian President Ebrahim Raisi favourably received an invitation from Saudi Arabia's King Salman to visit the kingdom on 19 March 2023. The rapprochement deal was concluded after Iranian agreement to halt its weapon supplies to Houthi militants in Yemen and abide by the UN arms embargo, thereby opening up the possibility to push the Houthis towards a negotiated settlement with the Yemeni government. Saudi and US officials remarked that Iranian observance of its commitments towards de-escalating Yemeni conflict were a "litmus test" for the survival of Chinese-brokered reconciliation deal.

Analysts deemed the agreement significant for several reasons. It could lead the way to easing of the Iran–Saudi Arabia proxy conflict, thus bringing stability to Yemen, Syria, Iraq, Lebanon and Bahrain. According to some analysts, the fact that the deal was brokered by China as opposed to the US, could mean that American influence in the region was declining. The deal could also enhance China's energy security given Chinese dependence on Iran and Saudi Arabia for oil. Some analysts contended that the agreement would hinder Israel–Saudi Arabia relations, while others contended that Israel's conflict with the Palestinians was more of a hindrance to its relations with Saudi Arabia than Iran.

Envoys from the two states met in Beijing on 6 April to confirm their commitment and formally restore relations.

On 8 April 2023, Saudi officials arrived in Iran to further advance the reopening of their respective diplomatic missions. The deal brokered by the People's Republic of China (PRC), known as the 'Beijing Agreement', a month earlier ended the diplomatic rift between the two nations "to bring security and stability to the turbulent Gulf region", according to the statement. On 29 April 2023, during a news conference in the Lebanese capital Beirut, Amir-Abdollahian announced the reopening of the embassies within days, but did not announce specific dates. The embassies closed in 2016 but recent talks were "implementing the tripartite agreement" facilitated by General Secretary of the Chinese Communist Party Xi Jinping and the PRC Foreign Ministry. The Iranian embassy in Riyadh reopened on 6 June while the Saudi embassy in Iran reopened in 9 August.

In August 2023, both Iran and Saudi Arabia applied to join BRICS. On 11 October 2023, Saudi Arabia's Crown Prince Mohammad bin Salman received a phone call from Iran's President Ebrahim Raisi to discuss the outbreak of the Gaza war.

==== Challenged relations after escalation of Israel–Iran tensions ====
During the Gaza war, a majority of the Saudi population stood behind the Palestinians and sympathised with their suffering, and subsequent to the suspected Israeli bombing of the Iranian embassy in Damascus the leadership of Saudi Arabia had rejected categorically the targeting of diplomatic facilities for any justification. However, during the April 2024 Iranian strikes in Israel, Saudi Arabia assisted Israel along with Jordan with the defence of Israel and their own territories. These events had further complicated Saudi relations with Iran. In order to maintain an acceptable approach to lower tensions in the Middle East, some analysts have emphasised the increased economic ties with Iran, which though stand in sharp contrast with the renewed efforts by Europe and the U.S. to further increase sanctions against Iran and its proxies.

In early October 2024, during a conference on the anniversary of the Al-Aqsa Storm operation, held in Tehran, Iranian foreign minister Abbas Araghchi announced his upcoming visit to Riyadh to discuss a ceasefire and the atrocities committed by Israel. After visiting Doha, Beirut and Damascus, Araghchi reaffirmed his stance to not further escalate the war in the Middle East while at the same time supporting resistance movements against Israel. Saudi Arabia has ascertained its neutrality in the conflict. Later that month, Iran warned all the Gulf states not to allow any action against Iran by using their airspace. Arab officials have indicated that Iran would retaliate against these states if their territories or airspace were used in such operations. In November 2024, Saudi Chief of General Staff Fayyad al-Ruwaili met his Iranian counterpart Mohammad Bagheri in Tehran. During the meeting, Ruwaili discussed increasing cooperation between the two countries' security forces.

Since the eruption of the Gaza war, Saudi Arabia has challenged the Abraham Accords when it re-established diplomatic relations with Iran. The Gulf states have favored regional diplomacy over war and de-escalation. In late 2024, the Abraham Accords appear to be stalled in light of the ongoing conflict in Palestine, Israel and Lebanon.

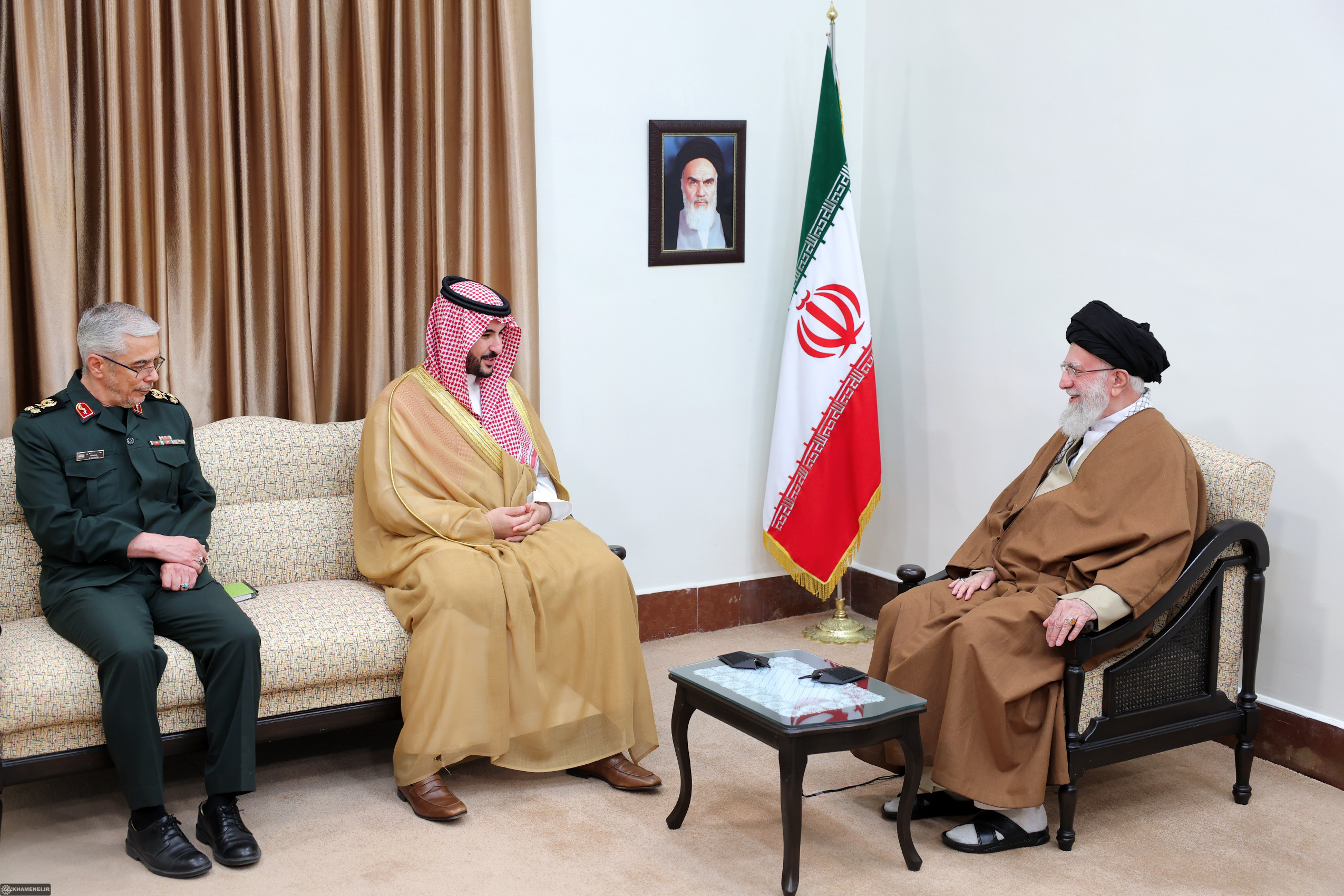
Saudi Arabia's Defense Minister Khalid bin Salman with Ayatollah Ali Khamenei and Iran's Major General Mohammad Bagheri, 17 April 2025

In April 2024 Iran revamped its relationships with Saudi Arabia with Khamenei receiving the Saudi King's letter and Saudi minister of Defense.

In the Twelve-Day War, Saudi Arabia condemned the Israeli attacks and diplomatically supported Iran.

Iranian President Masoud Pezeshkian and Crown Prince Mohammed bin Salman significantly strengthened diplomatic ties, reaching what MBS described as a "historic turning point." In late January 2026, Pezeshkian and MBS held a critical phone call to discuss regional stability following the arrival of a U.S. aircraft carrier in the region. MBS emphasized that Saudi Arabia would not allow its territory or airspace to be used for military actions against Iran.

On 28 February 2026, Iran's Supreme leader Ali Khamenei was assassinated in a series of airstrikes conducted by Israel and the United States. The Washington Post reported that U.S. President Donald Trump's decision to attack Iran came after Saudi Crown Prince Mohammed bin Salman and the Israeli government lobbied him repeatedly to make the move. Saudi Arabia has officially denied reports that Crown Prince Mohammed bin Salman privately urged Trump to launch military strikes against Iran.

== Sectarian basis for tensions ==
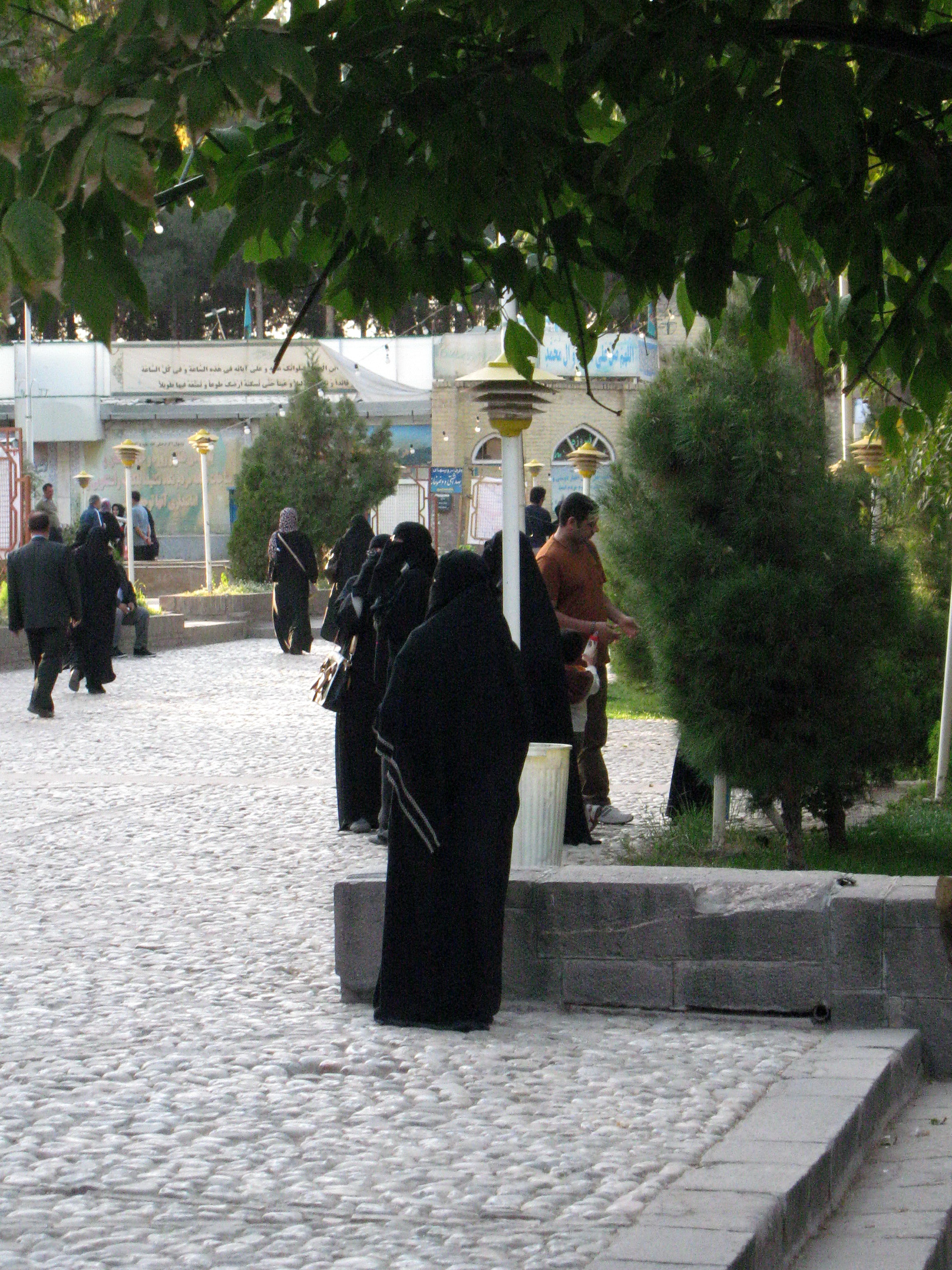
Saudi Arabian women in Nishapur, Iran

Historically, Iran–Saudi relationships have always been uncertain, something attributed to the different sects that the majority of populations in both countries follow. Saudi Arabia, which is a predominantly Sunni society, is skeptical of Shi'ite Iran's activities and influence in the Persian Gulf region. It is in this context that Iran-Saudi hostilities are sometimes seen as being the successor to Ottoman–Safavid relations.

Leading Sunni and Shi'ite Clerics in both countries deemed each other's religious beliefs as incorrect for decades. An attempt was made by the Sunnis to take the Tomb of Imam Hussein, one of the important religious leaders of Shi'ite theology and the grandson of Muhammad whose life is considered the main difference between Sunni and Shi'ite sects. Since then, tensions between both major sects of Islam, their followers, and their affiliates, have increased and this tension is considered unlikely to be resolved any time soon. According to Le Figaro, on 5 June 2010, King Abdullah of Saudi Arabia told Hervé Morin, then Defense Minister of France that: "There are two countries in the world that do not deserve to exist: Iran and Israel."

In 2016, Grand Mufti Abdul-Aziz ibn Abdullah Al ash-Sheikh was replaced by Sheikh Saleh bin Hamid as the giver of the hajj sermon. The Grand Mufti had given the sermon every year since 1981, but was replaced in 2016 after claiming that the Shi'ite leaders of Iran "are not Muslims."

== Saudi Arabia and Iran's attitudes toward Turkey and Qatar ==
Although the conflict between Saudi Arabia and Iran has been mostly between themselves, the two nations are also becoming more increasingly tangled in a triangle conflict after neo-Ottomanist Turkey, led by Recep Tayyip Erdoğan, demonstrated the desire to restore the Ottoman order that was once imposed at the expense of the Iranians and the Saudis, since the 2010s. Due to the historical enmities of Turkey towards both Iran and Saudi Arabia, the two countries' attitudes toward Turkey also have some impacts on Tehran and Riyadh's political decisions. Iran has had a complex relationship with Turkey, being Iran's major economic partner but also an enemy due to Turkey and Iran backing various proxy groups fighting each other while Saudi Arabia's relations with Turkey have deteriorated due to Turkish ambitions to restore the Turkish influence at the expense of Riyadh's power; it was in some aspect that Saudi Arabia and Iran found itself involuntarily on the same side, notably during the Kurdish–Turkish conflict when both Saudi Arabia and Iran back the Kurds against Turkey.

Relevant to Turkey is also reflected in the role of Qatar, which has very close relations with Turkey but was placed under an embargo by Saudi Arabia and its allies during the 2017-21 Qatar diplomatic crisis, during which Qatar opened full relations with Iran. While the Saudis reopened relations with Qatar in 2021, it was mainly due to the perception that the embargo against Qatar had failed, rather than the underlying issues between Qatar and the Saudis having been resolved. The 2023 Saudi-Iranian rapproachement would therefore possibly allow the Saudis to re-open their diplomatic conflict with Qatar.

== Doctrinal differences ==
The difference of political ideologies and governance also divided both countries. The Islamic Republic of Iran is based on the principle of Guardianship of the Islamic Jurists, which hold that a faqīh (Islamic jurist) should have custodianship over all Muslims, including their governance. Iran's Supreme Leader is a Shia faqīh. The founder of the Iranian revolution, Ayatollah Khomeini, was ideologically opposed to monarchy, which he believed to be contrary to Islamic principles. Saudi Arabia's monarchy, on the other hand, is conservative, not revolutionary, and its religious leaders have long supported monarchy where the king was given absolute obedience as long as he did not violate Islamic sharia law. Saudi Arabia has, however, a Shia minority which has made bitter complaints about institutional discrimination against it, and whom at times has been urged to overthrow the king. Both countries are major oil exporters but have clashed over energy policy. Saudi Arabia, with its large oil reserves and smaller population, has a greater interest in taking a long-term view of the global oil market and incentive to moderate prices. In contrast, Iran is compelled to focus on high prices in the short term.

Following Israeli strikes on Iran and regional airspace closures, Saudi Arabia ordered that Iranian Hajj pilgrims already in the country be given support and services until they could return home safely.

== Saudi Arabia, Iran and the United States ==
As far as the relationship between Saudi Arabia and the U.S. is concerned, both countries have been strategic allies for more than sixty years. Saudi Arabia sees itself as a firm and generous partner of the U.S. in the Cold War and in other international conflicts.

From 1953 to 1979, Iran under Mohammed Reza Pahlavi was also an ally of the United States.

The visits by US President George W. Bush to the Kingdom in 2008 reaffirmed these ties. Yet Saudis have always distanced themselves from American foreign policy, particularly with regards to Iran. Even when there was growing criticism against the former Iranian President, Mahmud Ahmadinejad, for his alleged hostile foreign policy in connection to Israel, Saudi Arabia recognised that Iran was a potential threat, and a regional power that was in position to create trouble within their borders. Therefore, Saudi Arabia's security over time required accommodation and good relations with its geographic neighbors notably Iran.

Prior to this visit, Saudi National Security advisor Prince Bandar bin Sultan, seen as one of the most pro-American figures in the region, had made a trip to Tehran to voice his government's interest in building harmonious relations with Iran. During Iranian President Ahmadinejad's 3 March 2007 visit, he discussed with King Abdullah the need to protect the Islamic world from enemy "conspiracies."

In 2007, President Ahmadinejad was the first Iranian leader to attend the annual summit of the Gulf Cooperation Council (GCC), which was established in 1980 in part to contain the ambitions of revolutionary Iran. This visit by the President of Iran was an event which signaled a possible change in relations. The same year, at Saudi Arabia's invitation, Ahmadinejad traveled to Saudi Arabia to take part in the annual Hajj (pilgrimage) to Mecca.

On 11 October 2011 US Attorney General Eric Holder accused Iran of planning to assassinate the Saudi Arabian ambassador to the United States Adel Al-Jubbair.

In 2013, Saudi Ambassador to Britain Mohammed bin Nawaf bin Abdulaziz Al Saud wrote an editorial in The New York Times criticizing Saudi Arabia's Western allies for not taking bold enough measures against Syria and Iran, thus destabilizing the Middle East and forcing Saudi Arabia to become more aggressive in international affairs. The Obama administration continued to reassure the Persian Gulf states that regional security is a U.S. priority, but, as of December 2013, the Gulf states express skepticism.

== Crime ==
On 1 January 2025, Saudi authorities announced via the official Saudi Press Agency (SPA) the execution of six Iranian citizens. They were arrested and convicted of drug trafficking which is a capital offense.

== See also ==
- Foreign relations of Iran
- Foreign relations of Saudi Arabia
- Shia–Sunni relations
- Iran–Saudi Arabia football rivalry
- Arab League–Iran relations
- International propagation of Salafism
