= Parviz Afshari =

Iranian diplomat, minister, and writer

- پرویز افشاری

Iranian Ambassador to Saudi Arabia
- In office Chargé d'affaires August 18, 1987 – 1988
- Preceded by: Mojtaba Hashemi; Hussein Sadeqi
- Succeeded by: Mohammad Ali Najafabadi

Personal details
- Born: January 1955

Afshari Parviz is a former Iranian diplomat, since 2015 Deputy Head of the Iranian Drug Prevention Authority and author.

== Career ==
In 1981, he joined the Foreign Service, spent three months in the passport department, and then three months in the finance department.

== Saudi-Iranian relations ==
Parviz Afshari was hired by the Ministry of Foreign Affairs as a political intern and with monthly salaries on October 10, 1981, was transferred to the First Political Bureau after six months in the Passport and Visa Office and another 6 months in the Office of General Affairs. He stayed in this position for six months and then left for a permanent mission at the Embassy of the Islamic Republic of Iran in Jeddah in Saudi Arabia. The memoirs of his nine years at the State Department are found in his book "Ambassador Without Embassy, Lawyer Without Client", which describes his missions in Saudi Arabia, Iraq, Canada, Malaysia and Kazakhstan. Afshari set out on the road to Damascus on the August 4, 1982, about a month after Khalid of Saudi Arabia died and the beginning of Fahd of Saudi Arabia's reign.

From July 1982, he was employed in the Iranian mission in Jeddah, a month earlier, on June 13, 1982, Khalid of Saudi Arabia had died and Fahd of Saudi Arabia followed him on the throne. His autobiographical reminiscences, contains a chronicle of Iranian-Saudi-Arab relations:

In 1933, Crown Prince Saud ibn Abd al-Aziz made an 8-day trip to Iran and met with Reza Shah Pahlavi. Between 1944 and 1948 diplomatic relations between the two governments were interrupted The Saudi religious police had arrested the Iranian pilgrim, Hajji Abu Talib al-Yazdi in the Grand Mosque in Mecca, accused him of throwing excrement on the Ka'bah, brought to justice, found guilty and beheaded. In 1948 diplomatic relations were resumed until 1979 with a delegation of goodwill. Ruhollah Khomeini had dialectically developed his idea of a theocracy from the Wahhabi real state. From 22 September 1980 to 20 August 1988 during the Iran–Iraq War, Saddam Hussein relied on the full support of Fahd of Saudi Arabia.

On May 7, 1984, allegedly four McDonnell F-4 fighter jets of the Iranian Air Force entered Saudi Arabia in an attack on an oil tanker in the Persian Gulf. On May 8, 1984, two Iranian fighters of same type of aircraft were shot down. Alaeddin Boroujerdi, the Iranian Chargé d'affaires, intended for the post of Ambassador, was expelled. The Iranian government did not send Mojtaba Hashemi whose language assets had been to poor to be designated as a diplomat.

Power conservation interests led to the regulation of mutual pilgrimage. On July 31, 1987, 402 people lost their lives in conflicts between Iranian Hajjis and Saudi Arabian Crowd control (275 Iranians, 85 Saudis, including police, and 42 pilgrims from other states). On August 1, 1987, in Tehran, the Saudi embassy was raided, looted, illegally deprived of the presence of personnel, ill-treated, and the homes of Saudi diplomats attacked, resulting in a sarcastic officer dying of his injuries.

The Iranian Chargé d'Affaires in Riyadh, Hussein Sadeqi, was declared persona non grata and had to leave Saudi Arabia within 48 hours. In this situation, Parviz Afshari became Iranian chargé d'affaires in Riyadh (Saudi Arabia). For the 1988 pilgrimage, the Saudi government cut the 150,000 to 45,000 visas for Iranian pilgrims to Mecca and broke diplomatic relations.

== Further career ==
His further career in the diplomatic service led him to Baghdad, Iraq. In 1995 he was a Legation Council in Ottawa, In 2001 he was a Legation Counselor in Kuala Lumpur, and in 2010 to Astana in Kazakhstan. In 2015, he became Deputy Head of the Iranian Drug Prevention Agency.
