= List of ambassadors of Iran to Egypt =

Coordinates: 30.039603°N 31.202332°E

Ambassador of Iran to Egypt
- Persian: سفیر جمهوری اسلامی ایران در مصر
- Coat of Arms of Iran
- Inaugural holder: Mirza Malkam Khan
- Formation: 1863
- Final holder: Abbas Nayeri
- Abolished: March 26, 1978

The Iranian ambassador in Cairo was the official representative of the Government in Tehran to the Government of Egypt.

== List of representatives ==
Diplomatic accreditation	Diplomatic accreditation Solar Hijri calendar	Ambassador	Persian language	Observations	List of presidents of Iran	List of heads of state of Egypt	Term end	Term end Solar Hijri calendar
1863	1241	Mirza Malkam Khan	Persian: ملکم خان ناظم‌الدوله	From 1863 until 1885 a series of consuls were appointed by the Persian ambassador to Istanbul to serve in Egypt for short periods before returning to Istanbul; one of them was the Persian constitutionalist Mālkom (Malcolm) Khan in 1279/1863 (Algar, p. 63).	Naser al-Din Shah Qajar	Isma'il Pasha	1863	1241
1884	1262	Moḥammad Khan Sarhang	Persian: اسحاق خان مفخم‌الدوله	In 1884 the Persian ambassador, Ḥājī Moḥammad Khan Sarhang, took residence in Cairo.	Naser al-Din Shah Qajar	Tewfik Pasha		
February 28, 1922	1300			Unilateral Declaration of Egyptian Independence	Ahmad Shah Qajar	Fuad I of Egypt	February 28, 1922	1300
February 28, 1922	1300	Fathullah Khan Pakravan (1865)	Persian: فتح‌الله خان امیرارفع	Mirza Fattalah Khan Amirarafi Iranian writer was working on the Iranian representation in Egypt.	Ahmad Shah Qajar	Fuad I of Egypt	1925	1303
1925	1303	Ghaffar Djalal	Persian: غفار جلال علاء		Reza Shah	Fuad I of Egypt	1928	1306
1931	1309	Mahmoud Djam	Persian: جواد سینکی	Javad Sinki	Reza Shah	Fuad I of Egypt	1934	1312
1934	1312	Ali Akbar Bahman	Persian: سلطان‌احمد راد	Sultan Ahmad Rad	Reza Shah	Fuad I of Egypt	1939	1317
1939	1317	Mahmoud Djam	Persian: جواد سینکی		Reza Shah	Farouk of Egypt	1943	1321
1939	1317	Ali Akbar Bahman	Persian: علی‌اکبر بهمن	Ali Akbar Bahman (Promotion of Embassy to Cobra Embassy) February 17, 1317 - March 1320	Reza Shah	Farouk of Egypt	1942	1320
1942	1320	Mahmoud Djam	Persian: محمود جم		Mohammad Reza Pahlavi	Farouk of Egypt	1948	1326
January 17, 1948	1326	Ghasem Ghani	Persian: قاسم غنی	From 1949 to 1950 he was Iranian ambassador to Turkey He had studied medicine for four years in Paris and had been Professor of Medicine at Tehran University.	Mohammad Reza Pahlavi	Farouk of Egypt	1949	1327
1949	1327	Ali Dashti	Persian: علی دشتی		Mohammad Reza Pahlavi	Farouk of Egypt	1952	1330
1952	1330	Masoud Moazed	Persian: مسعود معاضد		Mohammad Reza Pahlavi	Farouk of Egypt	1954	1332
1954	1332	Anoushirvan Sepahbadi	Persian: انوشیروان سپهبدی		Mohammad Reza Pahlavi	Mohamed Naguib	1959	1337
1959	1337	Jamshid Gharib	Persian: جمشید قریب		Mohammad Reza Pahlavi	Gamal Abdel Nasser	1961	1339
1960				The cessation of relations between Iran and Egypt followed the recognition of Israel by Mohammad Reza Shah. In 1960, he recognized Israel's right to exist and publicly declared that Israel and Iran should maintain economic ties.	Mohammad Reza Pahlavi	Gamal Abdel Nasser		
1971	1349	Khosrow Khosravani	Persian: خسرو خسروانی	Khosrow Khosravani from May 11, 1965 to 19676 he was Iranian ambassador to the United States, Egypt, Germany, and also represents the former government of Iran at the United Nations. He was born in 1293 in Mahallat. After completing elementary and secondary education, she went to England to continue her education and entered Birmingham University and completed her postgraduate degree in geology. After some time at the State Department, he served as the first secretary of the Iranian embassy to the US capital, Washington, and the following year; in 1332, he became Iran's representative to the United Nations, and then to Iran's Consul General in Hamburg. After a while, he became Iran's Minister of Planning in Washington, and afterwards, as he improved relations between Iran and Egypt, he went to Cairo as Ambassador to Iran.	Mohammad Reza Pahlavi	Anwar as-Sadat	1976	1354
1976	1354	Shapur Bahrami	Persian: شاپور بهرامی		Mohammad Reza Pahlavi	Anwar as-Sadat	1978	1356
March 26, 1978	1356	Abbas Nayeri	Persian: عباس نیری		Mohammad Reza Pahlavi	Anwar as-Sadat	1979	1357
1979	1356			Cessation of Iran-Egypt Relations Following the Islamic Revolution	Mohammad Reza Pahlavi	Anwar as-Sadat		
1979	1356			The two governments have interest offices on the territory of each other.	Mohammad Reza Pahlavi	Anwar as-Sadat		
May 1979		Interest Section in the Swiss embassy in Cairo		Egypt: relations broken May 1979. Interest Office closed May 87, in early 1985, Egyptian security forces uncovered an Iran-sponsored underground Islamist group, as evidence of the Iranian link with Islamic movement in Egypt were photographs of Ruhollah Khomeini presented. The two remaining Iranian diplomats in Cairo had been accused of collaborating with Islamic groups, expelled, and the Iranian Interest Section at the Cairo Swiss Embassy was summarily shut down.	Ali Khamenei	Hosni Mubarak	May 1987	
March 21, 1991		Behzar Khatiri		21 March 1991 The Foreign Ministry received the information from the Iranian Foreign Ministry that Mr. (Behzar Khatiri) will head the Iranian interests office	Mohammad Khatami	Hosni Mubarak		
2004		Mohammed Reza Dost		2004: Maher Abdel Wahed told a news conference on December 7 that Mohammed Reza Dost, a diplomat at the Iranian interest office in Cairo, was referred to trial on charges of recruiting Egyptian Mohammed Eid Dabbous to gather information.	Mohammad Khatami	Hosni Mubarak		
