= Ibrahim Saleh Bakr =

Saudi diplomat

Bakr Ibrahim Saleh
- ابراهيم صالح بكر

Saudi Ambassador to Ghana
- In office 1962–1966
- Succeeded by: Hisham Mishal Al-Suwailem

Saudi ambassador to Indonesia
- In office 1968–1974
- Preceded by: Sheikh Abdul Raouf Al-Sabban
- Succeeded by: Bakr Abbas Khomais

Saudi ambassador to Iran
- In office 1975 – February 16, 1980
- Preceded by: Muhammad Arab Hashem
- Succeeded by: Marvan Bashir Al-Roomi

Saudi ambassador to Venezuela
- In office 16 February 1980 – 15 March 1983
- Preceded by: Sheikh Faisal Al Hegelan
- Succeeded by: Sheikh Bakar Khomais; Jamal Ibrahim Nasef

Head of the Saudi mission next to the European Community
- In office 15 March 1983 – 28 June 1994
- Preceded by: Mohamed Charara
- Succeeded by: Nasser Alassaf

Personal details
- Born: 1923
- Died: 16 July 2014 (aged 90–91)
- Parent: Salih Bakr (father)
- Education: Columbia University, Political Science Georgetown University, Washington D.C.

Bakr Ibrahim Saleh (1923 – 16 July 2014) was a Saudi diplomat and from 1994 Assistant Secretary General for Political Affairs of the Organisation of Islamic Cooperation.

== Career ==
In 1948 Bakr joined the Foreign Service and was employed until 1953 in the Ministry of Foreign Affairs (Saudi Arabia). From 1953 to 1957 he was consul in the mission next to the Headquarters of the United Nations. From 1958 to 1959 he was first-class legation secretary in Cairo the capital of the United Arab States. From 1962 to 1966 he was chargé d'affaires from 1965 Ministre plénipotentireire in Accra (Ghana). From 1966 to 1968 he headed the West Department in the Ministry of Foreign Affairs. From 1968 to 1974 he was ambassador to Jakarta. From 1975 to 1980, he was ambassador to Tehran, where in 1976 he bought an impressive villa for about 4 million US dollars. From February 16, 1980 to March 15, 1983 he was ambassador to Caracas. From 15 March 1983 to 28 June 1994 he was a Permanent Representative of the Kingdom of Saudi Arabia to the European Commission in Brussels.

Starting in 1994 he was Assistant Secretary General for Political Affairs of the Organisation of Islamic Cooperation. He performed a number of tasks. For example, in 1995 he was the representative of the OIK Secretary-General in Kabul and Jalalabad.
