= 2026 Semnan unrest =

Unrest in Semnan, Iran

- Location: Semnan, Semnan province, Iran
- Date: September 6-7, 2026
- Target: Iraqis
- Victim: Several injured
- No. of participants: Around 150
- Motive: Unknown
- Accused: 3 suspects detained

The 2026 Semnan unrest occurred on September 6th and 7th, 2026 in the city of Semnan, Iran, when large crowds of locals attacked Iraqi students at Semnan University, leaving several injured and much property damaged.

== Background ==
Iran was a major destination for Iraqi students seeking higher education, and by August 2026, there were over 50,000 Iraqis enrolled at Iranian institutions, with over 95% pursuing postgraduate degrees across 180 inter-university agreements, according to the Iranian Minister of Science, Hossein Simaee Sarraf. The number of Iraqi students in Iran was gradually increasing and had reached several thousand by the time of the 2026 incident in Semnan. Many of the students were reportedly given scholarships by institutions such as the Islamic Revolutionary Guard Corps and the Popular Mobilization Forces. The PMF was controversial for its role in suppressing earlier Iranian protests. In October 2025, there were protests at Bu-Ali Sina University in Hamadan against the alleged harassment of a female student by an Iraqi student, with Iranian authorities preventing another planned protests by using batons. In August 2026, Iran International received more reports of local dissatisfaction with Iraqi students. Since the October 2025 incident in Hamadan, anti-Iraqi rhetoric increased on Iranian social media as videos of PMF fighters in Iran resurfaced, which intensified after more videos of Iraqis driving luxury cars through Iran while ordinary Iranians suffered from poverty. Before the Semnan incident, a group of Iraqis in Iran was kidnapped, while seven Iraqi tourists were beaten in Gilan just two weeks before, and Iraqis had also reported increasing hostility in Ilam and Isfahan. There were between 5,000 and 7,000 Iraqis studying at the Semnan University at the time of the incident.

== Riots ==
On the evening of September 6, 2026, more than 150 locals surrounded the Iraqi student dormitory at Semnan University before entering the dormitory and beating Iraqi students, seriously injuring many of them, while preventing several more students inside the dormitory from escaping. According to Baghdad Today, when the police arrived at the scene, they did not arrest anyone and only tried to stop the attack. The university president and district administrator also arrived at the scene, but the attackers prevented them from entering. It was alleged that the attacks were in response to the assault of an Iranian woman, with the channel Ruydad24 and several more social media users reporting it as such. However, reports from inside the dormitory claimed that the reason for the attacks was that two heavily drunk Iranian men entered the building snd began arguing with students before being removed, afterwards returning with around 150 people. This led to many conflicting reports about the incident. The crowd eventually dispersed, although there was a second attack on Iraqi students in Semnan on September 7, less than 24 hours later, while the Iraqi students had wooden poles.

Several students were seriously injured and much property was damaged, although the exact number and severity were not given. Semnan University authorities and Iranian security personnel later moved the students by buses from the Nikan complex to a different location. The governor of Semnan later announced on September 9 that three people, two men and a woman, had been arrested on suspected involvement in the riots on September 6, and that they were still investigating it.

== Reactions ==
The President of Semnan University released a formal apology to the Iraqi students for the incident. The public relations office of the Semnan University announced that the incident occurred outside a private dormitory housing international students, and that the incident was being investigated by university officials, city administration, and police. The state-run ISNA news agency, citing the Semnan University public relations office, published a message attributed to a group of Iraqi students who expressed appreciation for the support of university officials after the incident. The university told the Iraqi students that their exams would be conducted online, and that those who wished to leave the city would be able to starting on the morning of September 7, and would be provided passports if they did not have any.

The public relations office also rejected claims of sexual assault against a university student, claiming that the "dispute" had broken out between locals and international students outside the dormitory before briefly spilling inside. The university also claimed that the incident occurred near a private dormitory outside of its property and denied any confrontation between Iranian and foreign students, contrasting the statement of the Chief Justice describing clashes between "some citizens and several Iraqi students." In a separate statement, the public relations office called the sexual assault allegations "entirely false" and added that the crowd dispersed following the arrival of law enforcement officers and promises of an investigation. Despite the assurances, there were still questions over what caused the incident, and whether the rise of anti-Iraqi and anti-Arab sentiment in Iran had a role.

Iranian authorities later pledged to move the students to a safer, monitored location. The Iraqi Foreign Ministry called for legal action, and the Iraqi embassy in Tehran sent a delegation to check on the students. The Iraqi Foreign Ministry welcomed measures taken by Iranian authorities to protect the students. Haidar Nassar, the Iraqi cultural attaché in Tehran, claimed that the incident actually started when a drunk Iranian man entered the Iraqi student dormitory and began arguing with students, and after being forced out, had returned with a group of friends.

The Iraqi Embassy in Tehran and the Iraqi Cultural Counselor in Iran also announced the formation of a joint committee to investigate and follow up on the incident, and hold talks with Iranian officials. The Iraqi embassy announced that the safety of Iraqi students was a "priority" and urged them to remain calm and stay indoors. According to the Iraqi embassy statement, the joint committee was scheduled to travel to Semnan to speak with the Iraqi students and to investigate with Iranian authorities. The Iraqi embassy did not mention the reason for the attack or the alleged assault of an Iranian girl by several Iraqi students. On September 8, after the second attack, the Iraqi embassy announced that the crisis had been "fully contained" and that the students were given a one-month leave as a way to calm tensions and restore stability. On September 11, Sadruddin al-Qabanji, the Friday imam of Najaf, called for Iraqi-Iranian relations not to be strained due to the incident.
