= Iranian Diplomatic Police =

Diplomatic Police پلیس دیپلماتیک

Jurisdictional structure
- National agency: Iran
- Operations jurisdiction: Iran
- Specialist jurisdictions: Diplomatic personnel and facilities; Protection of international or domestic VIPs, protection of significant state assets

Operational structure
- Parent agency: Police Command of the Islamic Republic of Iran

The Diplomatic Police (Persian: پلیس دیپلماتیک) is a subdivision of the Police Command of the Islamic Republic of Iran, responsible for protection of diplomatic missions in Iran and their VIPs under diplomatic law.

== See also ==
- 2011 attack on the British Embassy in Iran
- 2016 attack on the Saudi diplomatic missions in Iran
