= Embassy of Saudi Arabia, Tehran =

Royal Embassy of Saudi Arabia in Tehran
- سفارة المملكة العربية السعودية في طهران
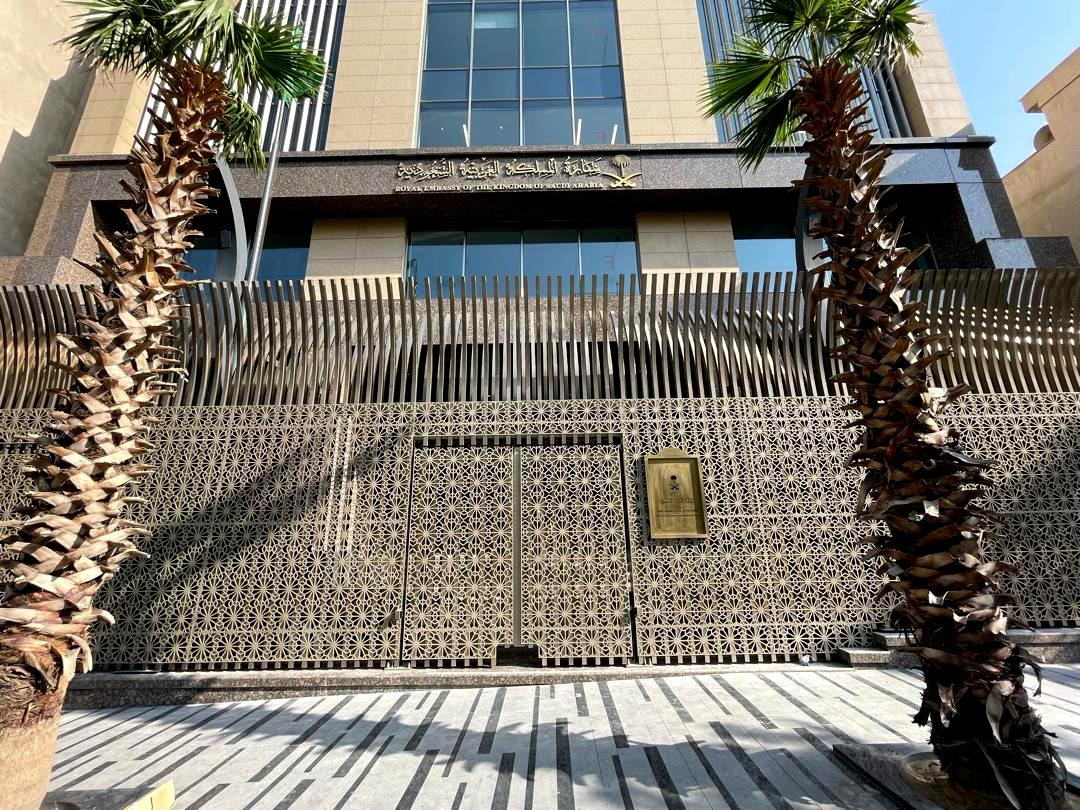
- Embassy of Saudi Arabia in Tehran, Iran
- Interactive map of the Royal Embassy of Saudi Arabia in Tehran area

General information
- Type: Embassy
- Location: تهران، سعادت آباد، میدان بهرود، خیابان 33، هتل اسپیناس پالاس, Tehran, Iran
- Coordinates: 35°46′51″N 51°21′46″E

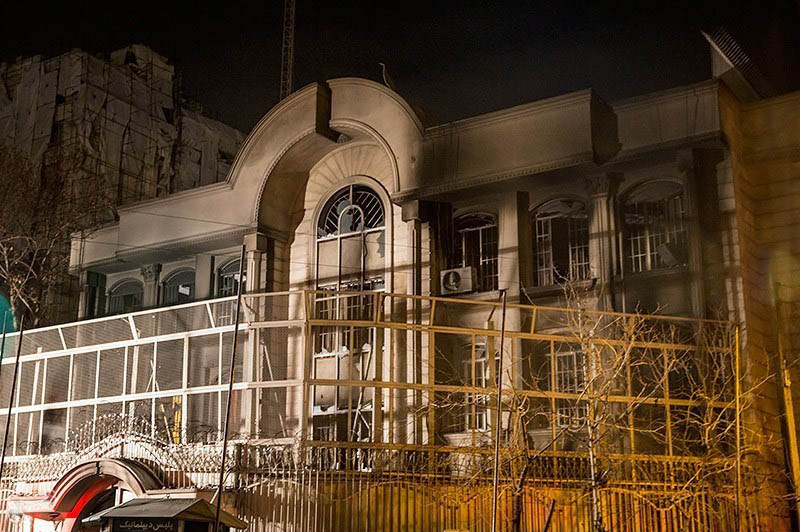
Aftermath of the Saudi embassy in Tehran after it was set ablaze by Iranian protesters.

The Embassy of the Kingdom of Saudi Arabia in Tehran (Persian: سفارت عربستان سعودی، تهران) is the diplomatic mission of Saudi Arabia in Iran.

The embassy was closed in January 2016 following its mob attack and arson. Via a diplomatic agreement brokered by China in March 2023, the embassy was reopened in August 2023.

Its current address is Espinas Palace Hotel, Street 33, Bahroud Square, Sa'adat Abad, Tehran, Iran.

== History ==
Prior to January 2016, the mission was headed by Hasan Ibrahm Hamad Al-Zoyed, ambassador of the Kingdom of Saudi Arabia in Tehran.

After the execution of Nimr al-Nimr, a prominent Shiite cleric, in January 2016 by the Saudi government, an angry Iranian mob attacked the Embassy in Tehran.

The embassy was set on fire by an Iranian mob with a Molotov cocktail. The embassy was empty during the protests. Iranian police responded to the riot and arrested 40 people during the incident. The day after, protests were held again by hundreds of Iranians in Tehran, and President Rouhani called the damage on embassy "by no means justifiable". The Iranian Foreign Ministry has appealed for the public to calm and to respect diplomatic premises. The Saudi Arabia government severed the bilateral relationship between the two governments following the incident.

The embassy resumed operations in August 2023. Saudi Arabia's first ambassador to Iran since the severing of relations, Abdullah bin Saud al-Anzi, arrived on 5 September 2023.

== See also ==
- Iran–Saudi Arabia relations
- Ambassadors of Saudi Arabia to Iran
- Diplomatic missions of Saudi Arabia
