= 2010 attack on Pakistan ambassador to Iran =

Attack on Pakistani ambassador in Tehran

- Location: 35.6892°N 51.3890°E; Tehran, Iran
- Date: 11 May 2010 (IRDT (UTC+4:30))
- Target: Mohammad Bax Abbasi, Pakistan's ambassador to Iran
- Attack type: Knife attack; attempted assassination
- Weapon: Knife
- Deaths: 0
- Injuries: 1 (Ambassador M. B. Abbasi)
- Victim: M. B. Abbasi
- Perpetrators: 21-year-old Afghan national
- Motive: Alleged robbery (according to Iranian authorities); initially reported as an attempted assassination

On 11 May 2010, the Pakistani Ambassador to Iran Mohammad Bax Abbasi, survived an assassination attempt on his life in Tehran. The Pakistani ambassador was injured in the attack. This was a second attack on a Pakistan mission in Iran, the first attack took place in the Pakistani embassy in 2009.

According to the Iranian news sources and police investigations, the attacker was a 21-year-old "Afghan citizen" with whom the ambassador were involved in some altercation. According to the Pakistani news media, the ambassador was in the hospital sustained minimal injuries. Abbasi has been a banker prior to his appointment to this diplomatic assignment. The Iranian Students' News Agency (ISNA) also reported that the "ambassador was on his way he had a clash with an attacker, he was injured on the head and fell. The attacker was arrested by the Iranian police and Tehran prosecutor-general told IRNA news agency that: "during the interrogation, the accused said he wanted to mug the ambassador." After a check-up at the local hospital, the ambassador was discharged from the hospital on May 13, 2010.
