= 2016 attack on the Saudi diplomatic missions in Iran =

- Part of Iran–Saudi Arabia proxy conflict
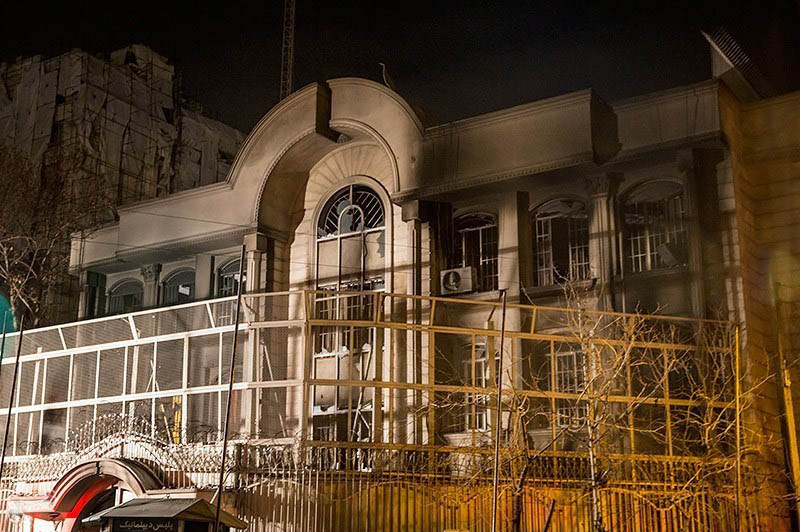
- The Saudi embassy in Tehran after the attack
- Date: 2–3 January 2016
- Location: Kashanak, Tehran, Iran (embassy); Sajjad Shahr, Mashhad, Iran (consulate); 35°48′05″N 51°28′32″E (Tehran); 36°19′07″N 59°32′56″E (Mashhad)
- Caused by: Protests against the government of Saudi Arabia and the House of Saud over the execution of Nimr al-Nimr.; Reaction to the 2016 Saudi Arabia mass execution.
- Methods: Demonstrations, riots, arson, vandalism
- Result: Embassy in Tehran arsoned and destroyed: Severance of Iran–Saudi Arabia relations; Sudan, Bahrain, Djibouti, the Comoros and Somalia severed diplomatic ties with Iran; Governments of Kuwait and Qatar recalling ambassadors from Iran; UAE summons the Iranian ambassador in Abu Dhabi, recalls its ambassador from Tehran and downgrades ties with Iran from ambassadorial level to chargé d'affaires; Jordan summons the Iranian ambassador in Amman; Arab League emergency meeting held in Cairo upon Saudi Arabia's request.; Saudi Arabia boycotts all matches played in Iran during the 2016 AFC Champions League

Parties
Official positions; Judicial Power: Anti-Saudi protestors; "Unnamed enemy infiltrators"; Ministry of Interior: "An organized group which has been active in Karaj and Tehran for more than 10 years" Alleged: Islamic Revolutionary Guard Corps: Basij; Ansar-e Hezbollah	Disciplinary Force: Diplomatic Police; Special Unit

Lead figures
Hassan Kordmihan; Hamid Ostad (alleged)	Gen. Hassan Arabsorkhi; Safar-Ali Baratlou

Number
~200	Unknown

Casualties
- Death: None
- Arrested: ~100 protesters (as of 24 January 2016)

The 2016 attack on the Saudi diplomatic missions in Iran was a mob action on 2 January 2016 by protesters demonstrating against the execution of prominent Saudi Arabian Shi'a cleric Sheikh Nimr al-Nimr. Mobs stormed the Saudi embassy in Tehran and the Saudi consulate in Mashhad and ransacked them. The embassy building was set on fire with Molotov cocktails and petrol bombs. During the attacks, the police arrived and dispersed protesters from the embassy premises and extinguished the fire.

The attacks were later condemned by Supreme Leader of Iran Ali Khamenei, and Iranian president Hassan Rouhani. On 24 January, Gholam-Hossein Mohseni-Eje'i announced that around 100 people involved in the attack were taken into custody by the authorities.

== Background ==
Moments after Sheikh Nimr was executed, the Saudi Arabian chargé d'affaires was summoned to the Iranian Foreign Ministry to protest against the execution. Foreign Ministry Spokesman Hossein Jaberi said that the Saudi government "supports terrorist movements and Takfiri extremists, while executing and suppressing critics inside the country".

The remarks were later condemned by Saudi Arabia as "hostile" and the ministry summoned the Iranian ambassador in Riyadh. The ministry expressed "the kingdom's astonishment and its utter rejection of these hostile statements, which it deemed a blatant intervention in the kingdom's affairs", according to a statement released by the Saudi Press Agency.

== Incursion ==
About several thousand demonstrators gathered near the embassy on Saturday night to protest and strongly condemn the execution of Sheikh Nimr. The rally began quietly, but some participants attempted to storm the building by climbing the embassy's fence, breaking down the door, throwing around papers on the roof and seizing the Saudi flag. The protesters chanted, "Death to the Al Saud [family]", the ruling family of Saudi Arabia among other slogans. It later turned violent after demonstrators began throwing petrol bombs and Molotov cocktails at the embassy and then broke into the compound. The police arrived and dispersed protesters from the embassy premises and extinguished the fire.

In Mashhad, Iran's second largest city, demonstrators also set fire at the Saudi consulate and tore down the Saudi flag.

== Reactions ==
=== Iran ===
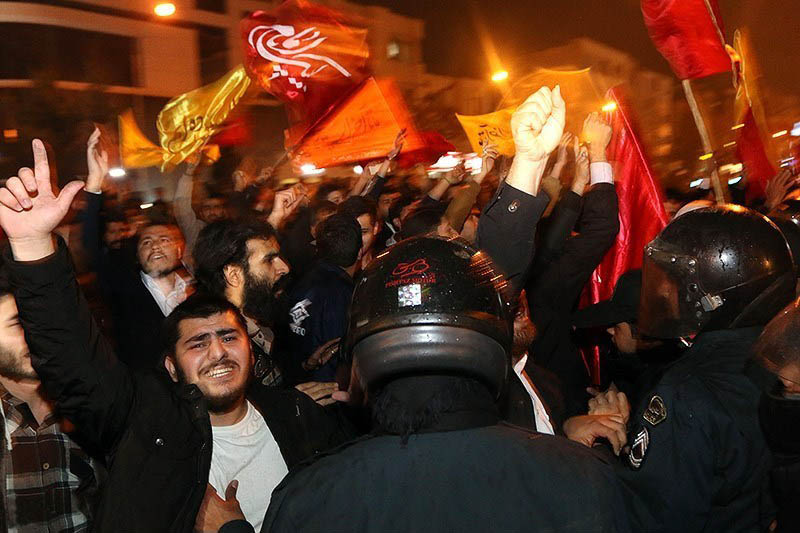
Protest in Mashhad in front of Saudi consulate (3 January 2016)

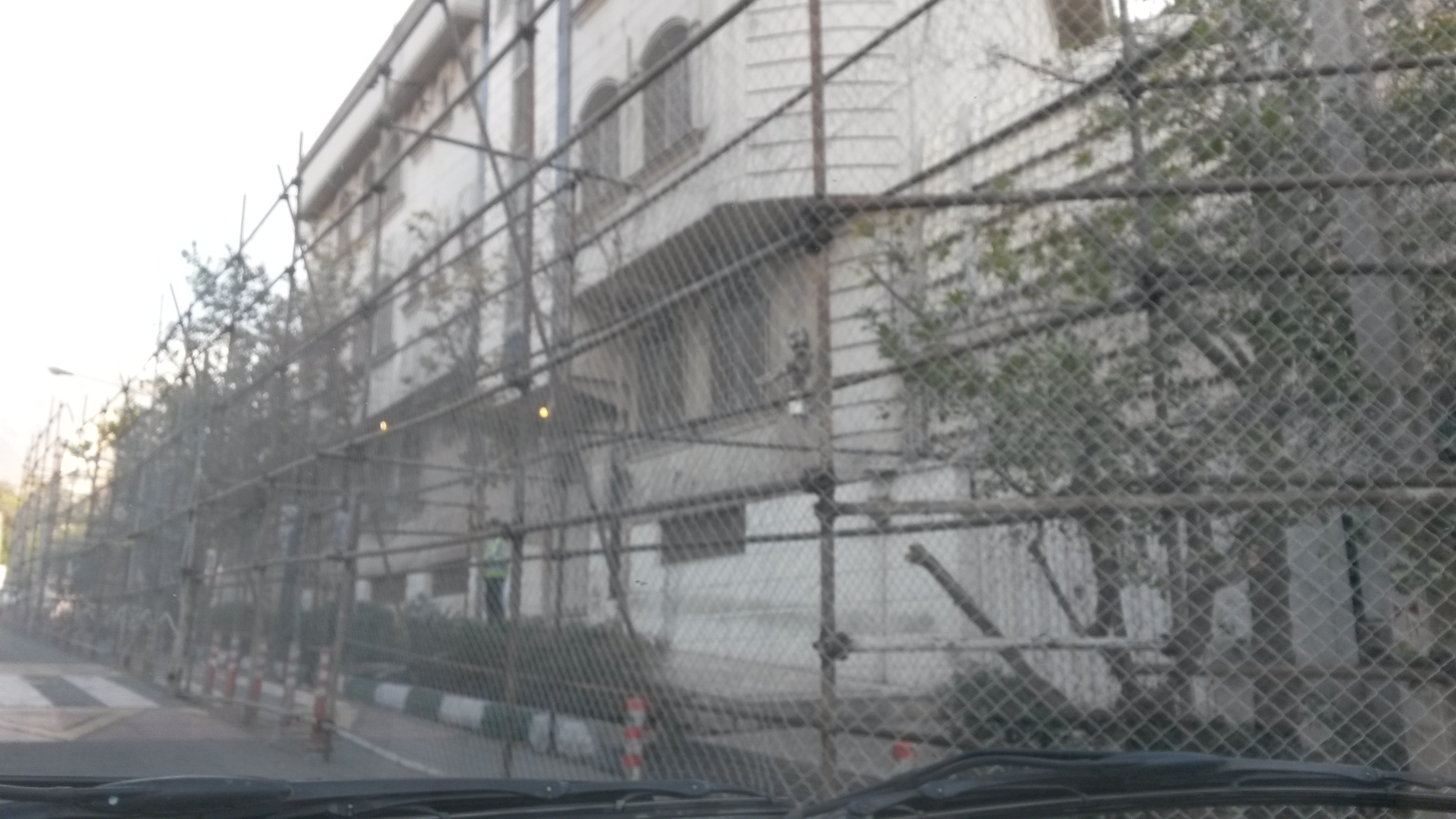
Saudi embassy, three months before attacks (4 October 2015)

Supreme Leader of Iran Ali Khamenei condemned the attacks and known it as "a very bad and wrong incident". Also, he declared that: "like the British embassy attack before it, this was against the country (Iran) and Islam, and I didn't like it."

Iranian President Hassan Rouhani condemned the attacks while at the same time he also condemned the execution of Nimr al-Nimr. He blamed the attacks on "extremist individuals". He has pledged to protect the security of foreign missions and prosecute those responsible for attacking Saudi diplomatic posts, in a series of messages posted on his Twitter account moments after the attack. On 6 January, President Rouhani has asked the Iranian judiciary to immediately prosecute the attackers invoked. He said by punishing the attackers and those who orchestrated this obvious offense, his government should put an end once and forever to such damage and insults to Iran's dignity and national security."

The Iranian authorities have expressed regret over the attacks and arrested at least 40 individuals in connection to the attack.

Five days later on January 7, 2016, Iran's foreign ministry made the claim that Saudi warplanes had "deliberately" targeted its embassy to Yemen in the city of Sana'a. Iran's report included claims that,"a number of the building's guards" had been injured as a result of the bombing. Despite this assertion San'aa residents and the Associated Press have reported that the embassy suffered no visible damage. Currently General Ahmad Asseri from the Saudi-led coalition is investigating Iran's allegations.

On 24 January, Iranian judiciary spokesman Gholam-Hossein Mohseni-Eje'i announced on state TV that they arrested around 100 people involved in the attack. Some of them were later released.

=== Saudi Arabia ===
Following the attack, Saudi Foreign Minister Adel al-Jubeir announced that they will break off diplomatic relations with Iran, recalling its diplomats from Tehran and declared Iranian diplomats in Riyadh personae non grata, ordering to leave the kingdom within 48 hours.

A day later on 4 January, Foreign Minister al-Jubeir said that they will end air traffic and trade links with Iran and also cutting off all commercial relations with Iran. In addition, the Saudi government has imposed a travel ban on its citizens from visiting Iran. Iranian pilgrims would still be welcome to visit Islam's holiest sites in Mecca and Medina, either for the annual Hajj or at other times of year on the Umrah pilgrimage.

=== Other countries ===
- Bahrain: The Bahrain Ministry of Foreign Affairs has "strongly condemned the two terrorist attacks on the Embassy of the Kingdom of Saudi Arabia in Tehran and its Consulate in Mashhad in the Islamic Republic of Iran." In a statement it said that "these demagogic and barbarian acts represent flagrant violation to the international convictions and norms, and the 1961 Vienna Convention which all safeguard the security and protection to the Diplomatic Missions." On 4 January 2016, Bahrain severed diplomatic ties with Iran, accusing it of interference in Saudi internal affairs and "increasing, flagrant and dangerous meddling" in the internal affairs of Gulf and Arab states, including Bahrain. The Bahrain foreign ministry gave Iranian diplomats 48 hours to leave the country.
- Bangladesh: The Bangladeshi Foreign Ministry condemns the attacks on Saudi embassy in Tehran and its consulate in Mashhad, saying such acts are in clear violation of the 1961 and 1963 Vienna Convention on Diplomatic Relations.
- Djibouti: On 6 January, Djibouti Foreign Minister Mahamoud Ali Youssouf has decided to sever diplomatic relations with Iran in order to show solidarity with Saudi Arabia.
- Egypt: The spokesman of the Egyptian Foreign Ministry has condemned attacks. The Egyptian government has stressed "the need to respect the inviolability of the premises of diplomatic and consular missions and the safety of their personnel, which is guaranteed by the Vienna Convention on Diplomatic Relations". During a visit to Riyadh on 5 January, Egypt's Foreign Minister Sameh Shoukry denounced the attacks as "unacceptable" and said Iran's actions are an attempt to "intervening in the kingdom's internal affairs".
  - The Egyptian Foreign Ministry spokesman Ahmed Abu Zeid said Egypt condemned attacks against the Saudi embassy in Tehran and the Saudi consulate in Mashhad in Iran. Egypt will stand with Saudi Arabia against Iranian meddling with Riyadh and other Arab countries’ domestic affairs, he added that diplomatic relations will continue to be severed with Iran "for well-known reasons."
  - Deputy Foreign Minister Hamdi Loza condemned "threats" against Saudi Arabia for enforcing its domestic law on a Saudi citizen to defend national security.
- Jordan: The Jordanian government summoned the Iranian ambassador in Amman to protest the attacks.
- Morocco: The Moroccan Foreign Ministry has condemned the attacks, adding that it contravenes diplomatic rules and practices. It has called on the Iranian government to adhere to the Vienna Convention regarding the protection of diplomatic missions.
- Oman: The Omani government has condemned the attacks. A statement issued by the foreign ministry said that the Sultanate considers these actions unacceptable and at the same time affirms the importance of finding new rules that prohibit any kind of intervention in countries’ internal affairs.
- Philippines: The Philippines' Department of Foreign Affairs called on all parties "to work together to ease sectarian tensions and to promote reconciliation” they also called "for full respect for the inviolability of diplomatic premises in all nations”.
- Qatar: The State of Qatar condemned the attacks and has decided to recall its ambassador from Tehran while the Qatari Foreign Affairs Ministry issuing a protest statement at the Iranian embassy in Doha saying that it constitutes a violation of the international charters and norms that emphasize the protection of diplomatic missions and their staff.
- Somalia: On 7 January, the Somali government has decided to sever all diplomatic relations with Iran and ordered all Iranian diplomats and embassy staff to leave within 72 hours. The Somali foreign ministry has accused Iran of trying to destabilize Somalia and said it has recalled its acting ambassador to Iran. The ministry said in a statement that this step has been taken after careful consideration and in response to the Islamic Republic of Iran's continuous interference in Somalia's internal affairs.
- Sudan: Sudan joined in solidarity with Saudi Arabia and broke off diplomatic relations with Iran.
- United Arab Emirates: On 4 January UAE recalled its ambassador Saif Al Zaabi from Tehran, decreased the number of diplomats in Iran, and downgraded diplomatic relationship with Iran to charge d’affaires. The UAE also lowered the amount of Iranian diplomats in the Iranian embassy in Abu Dhabi.
- United States: US State Department Spokesperson John Kirby has urged Iran and Saudi Arabia to take affirmative steps to calm tensions. The US government is aware of the Saudi governments' decision to close Iranian diplomatic missions, but believes "that diplomatic engagement and direct conversations remain essential in working through differences."

=== Intergovernmental organizations ===
- Arab League: Foreign ministers at the Arab League appeared at an emergency meeting in Cairo on 4 January to condemn the attacks on Saudi diplomatic missions and accused the Iranian government of failing to protect them. It a statement released after the meeting, the Arab League also condemned the reported discovery by Bahrain of a militant group that it said was backed by Iran's Revolutionary Guards. All member states have voted in favor of the resolution except Lebanon, where Hezbollah is a powerful political force backed by the Iranian government.
- United Nations: UN Security Council, in response to a letter by Saudi Arabia, condemned the attack on the Saudi diplomatic missions in Tehran and Mashhad. UNSC has called on Iranian authorities "to protect diplomatic and consular property and personnel, and to respect fully their international obligations in this regard" while it urged both sides to "maintain dialogue and take steps to reduce tensions in the region".

== See also ==
- 2011 attack on the British Embassy in Iran
- 2026 Semnan University riots
- Execution of Nimr al-Nimr
- Iran–Saudi Arabia proxy conflict
- Shia–Sunni relations
