= Tiger Squad =

Rapid Intervention Force
- قوة تدخل سريع
- Active: 2017–present
- Country: Saudi Arabia
- Allegiance: Crown Prince of Saudi Arabia
- Branch: Saudi Royal Guard Regiment
- Type: Protective security unit
- Role: Death squad
- Nicknames: Tiger Squad; Lethal Capabilities Crew; Midnight Dancers
- Engagements: Assassination of Jamal Khashoggi; Kidnapping and torture of Loujain al-Hathloul

Commanders
- Current commander: Maj. Gen. Ahmad Asiri; Sgt. Saud al-Qahtani

The Tiger Squad (Arabic: فرقة النمر, Firqat el-Nemr), also known as UNIT 1103, and officially called the Rapid Intervention Force (Arabic: قوة التدخل السريع, Quat al-Tadakhul al-Sarie), is a protective security unit under the Crown Prince of Saudi Arabia, Mohammed bin Salman. According to an unnamed source interviewed by the London-based online news outlet Middle East Eye following the assassination of Jamal Khashoggi in October 2018 and a BBC source inside Saudi Arabia who has a relative in the squad, it is a Saudi team that consists of approximately one-hundred fifty Saudi officers.

According to the Middle East Eye source, the Tiger Squad is a death squad of members from the military and intelligence agencies that has the mandate to carry out anti-irregular forces, clandestine and covert operations, commando style raids, executions killing Saudi dissidents inside Saudi Arabia and abroad in a way that "goes unnoticed by the media, the international community and politicians", executive protection, force protection in royal palace, manhunt, and urban counterterrorism. Sa'ad Al-Faqih, a Saudi opposition leader who claims he knows about this squad, confirmed that the role of the squad was to target and kill Saudi opponents.

== History and composition ==
According to a report from the New York Times, the personnel that would make up the Rapid Intervention Force originally received paramilitary training from Tier 1 Group sometime before 2017. The move was initially authorized by then-President Barack Obama through the US Department of State. Louis Bremer from Tier 1 Group's parent company, Cerberus Capital Management, insisted the training was only for protective security of MbS, and not for carrying out targeted assassinations. There was no evidence that the US Department of State was aware of what the operatives-in-training would be utilized for.

According to the Middle East Eyes source, the Tiger Squad was formed in 2017 and as of October 2018 consists of 50 secret service and military personnel. The group members are recruited from different branches of the Saudi forces, directing several areas of expertise. The source was independently verified by Middle East Eye, though it could not confirm his information. On the other hand, BBC Newsnight reported a team of fifty Saudi officers to target Saudi critics was created in summer of 2018, and, according to David Ignatius, United States intelligence became aware in September 2018 of a "tiger team" to be created by Asiri for covert operations against unknown targets.

The Middle East Eye source said the Tiger Squad assassinates dissidents using varying methods such as planned car accidents, house fires, or injecting toxic substances into adversaries during regular health checkups. Saudi Crown Prince Mohammad bin Salman had selected five members of his personal security team to serve in the Tiger squad.

== Role and organization ==
The Rapid Intervention Force serves the Crown Prince of Saudi Arabia, Mohammed bin Salman, as both a protective security unit and counter-dissident force. While it is officially part of the Saudi Royal Guard Regiment, it is solely loyal to the Crown Prince. It has been operating as early as 2017, already engaging in forced repatriations of Saudi dissidents, arbitrary detention and torture of women's rights activists in Saudi Arabia. The unit is overseen by Saud al-Qahtani, the former General Supervisor of the Center for Studies and Media Affairs, with its commanding officer being Maj. Gen. Maher Abdulaziz Mutreb, a senior officer of the General Intelligence Presidency.

== Alleged operations ==
Claims of particular operations include:

- 2 October 2018 – Jamal Khashoggi
- 2018 – Sheikh Suleiman bin Abdul Rahman al-Thuniyan
- 2018 – Omar Abdulaziz (preliminary phase)
- 2018 – Saad bin Khalid Al Jabry (attempted)

=== Jamal Khashoggi ===
According to the Middle East Eye source, the five members of the Tiger Squad selected by Mohammad bin Salman allegedly spearheaded the 15-member death squad responsible for murdering and dismembering Washington Post columnist Jamal Khashoggi inside the Saudi consulate in Istanbul. In a later report, Middle East Eye stated seven members of the 15-member death squad were Mohammed bin Salman's personal bodyguards. According to the BBC source, the whole 15-member death squad killing Jamal Khashoggi were part of the Tiger Squad (Tiger Team). The New York Times reported that according to US officials who had access to classified intelligence reports, the members of the team involved in killing Khashoggi were also involved in more than a dozen operations since 2017. The US officials referred to this team as "Saudi Rapid Intervention Group". The Washington Post had reported citing anonymous intelligence officials that some members of the team had received special operations training by a company operating in Arkansas under the licence of the US State Department as part of US-Saudi cooperation.

=== Al-Thuniyan ===
The Tiger Squad also reportedly killed Suleiman Abdul Rahman al-Thuniyan, a Saudi court judge who was murdered by injection of a deadly virus into his body when he had visited a hospital for a regular health checkup. "One of the techniques the tiger squad uses to silence dissidents or opponents of the government is to 'kill them with HIV, or other sorts of deadly viruses'". However, some sources have stated that al-Thuniyan died after he suffered from a chronic disease.

=== Omar Abdulaziz ===
Middle East Eye's source said, "I know of another attempt, which was to lure Saudi dissident Omar Abdulaziz in Canada to the consulate and kill him, but Abdulaziz refused to go and the mission failed. Khashoggi was the first [successful] operation." Abdulaziz said he was approached in 2018 (before Jamal Khashoggi was murdered) "by Saudi officials who urged him to visit their embassy with them to collect a new passport". Abdulaziz said that after he refused, Saudi authorities arrested two of his brothers and several of his friends in Saudi Arabia. He secretly recorded his conversations with those officials, which were several hours long, and provided them to The Washington Post. Neither he nor the newspaper allege these officials wanted to kill him during the meetings.

=== Saad bin Khalid al-Jabry ===
In 2020, Saad bin Khalid al-Jabry, a former senior official in the Saudi government, exiled in Canada, filed a lawsuit in the United States against Mohammad bin Salman, alleging that bin Salman had sent the Tiger Squad to Canada in 2018, "carrying two bags of forensic tools", aiming to assassinate al-Jabry. The Tiger Squad agents were blocked on entry to Canada by border officials.

== Sanctions ==
In February 2021, the United States Treasury placed sanctions on Asiri and the entire squad unit for their alleged involvement in the killing of Khashoggi.

== See also ==
- Human rights in Saudi Arabia
- Shabiha
- General Intelligence Presidency
- 2017–19 Saudi Arabian purge
