= Jamal Elshayyal =

British journalist and Middle Eastern correspondent

- جمال الدين الشيال
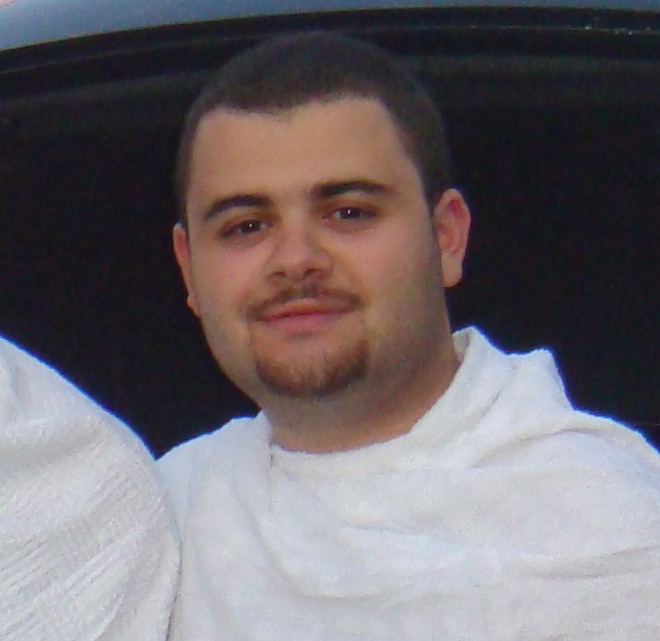
- Elshayyal in Saudi Arabia, 2008
- Born: c. 1984; Scotland
- Citizenship: UK
- Education: SOAS University of London
- Occupations: Journalist, correspondent, consultant, producer
- Children: 3
- Writing career
- Years active: 2006-present

Jamal Elshayyal (born c. 1984) is a British journalist, senior correspondent, and producer for Al Jazeera English. His focus is on countries within the MENA and Gulf Cooperation Council.

== Early life ==
Elshayyal was born c. 1984 in Scotland and has at least one brother, Abdul Rahman. They are of Egyptian heritage. Elshayyal studied economics and Arabic at University of London's School of Oriental and African Studies. At university, he was an executive for the National Union of Students.

== Career ==
Elshayyal started his career in the political sector, earning the title of "youngest ever candidate for a major political party in the British elections" in 2006 when he stood in Uxbridge South. The same year, he joined Al Jazeera English a freelance consultant, then helped launch its Middle East desk as its first Middle East editor. Elshayyal spent his first few years working in Al Jazeera's studio in Doha, Qatar.

His first field reporting experience was in May 2010 when he boarded the MV Mavi Marmara in Cyprus as part of the Gaza Freedom Flotilla aid delivery to the Gaza Strip. In the early hours of the morning, before going to sleep, Elshayyal contacted Al Jazeera to tell them not to expect anything major just yet; this was the last report to leave the boat before all communication channels were cut off by Israeli troops. He later noted that that event was the first time he "saw someone shot and killed in front of" him. After the boat was attacked, Elshayyal was handcuffed by Israeli soldiers and taken to prison in Beersheba. He was released the following afternoon but remained in Israeli custody.

Major events covered by Elshayyal include the 2011 Egyptian revolution, the First Libyan Civil War, the Syrian civil war, the Yemeni Revolution, the 2013 Egyptian coup d'état, the Houthi takeover in Yemen, the 2016 Turkish coup d'état attempt, and the 2018 assassination of Jamal Khashoggi. During the Egyptian Revolution, he was based in Alexandria and reported from both Cairo and Suez. During the Fall of Kabul in 2021, he was in Doha. His exclusive reporting for Al Jazeera includes "secret documents from inside Gaddafi's intelligence HQ and uncovering torture and human rights abuses inside Egyptian prisons."

Throughout his career, Elshayyal has acted as advisor on terrorism, community relations, and racism to the Metropolitan Police, the mayor of London, the Foreign, Commonwealth and Development Office, and the Department for Education and Skills.

== Personal life ==
Elshayyal had returned from his honeymoon days before the 2011 Egyptian Revolution.
