= Exercise North Thunder =

North Thunder
- Type: Military exercises
- Location: Kingdom of Saudi Arabia
- Target: Raise the technical and combat efficiency combat readiness to carry out joint missions between the participating States forces rates
- Date: February–March 2016
- Executed by: 21 Countries: Saudi Arabia; Bahrain; Chad; Comoros; Djibouti; Egypt; Jordan; Kuwait; Malaysia; Maldives; Mauritania; Morocco; Oman; Pakistan; Qatar; Senegal; Sudan; Tunisia; Turkey; United Arab Emirates; Yemen

North Thunder (or in Arabic: رعد الشمال Raʿad aš-Šamāl / Raad al-Shamal) was a joint military exercise held in the Kingdom of Saudi Arabia with the participation of 20 Arab and Islamic countries; notably the United Arab Emirates, Egypt, Bahrain, Sudan, Jordan, Pakistan, Qatar, Kuwait, Morocco, Chad, Maldives, Comoros, Tunisia, Oman, Malaysia and Yemen in February–March 2016.

== Purpose ==
The exercise aimed to raise the technical and combat efficiency of the units involved and improve logistics and readiness rates for the implementation of joint security and stability missions in the region, notably Syria. A spokesman for the Arab coalition forces, Ahmad Assiri, said the aim of the exercise is to achieve the highest level of preparedness, exchange expertise and promote coordination among the 21 participating countries.

It has also been suggested, considering the forces involved, that the exercise could be the beginning of a land assault on Syria in conjunction with the Turkish Land Forces invading Syria from the north. On 13 February The Independent reported that Saudi troops and fighter aircraft were deploying to Incirlik Air Base in Turkey in preparation for intervention in Syria; however, this could simply indicate a Saudi recommitment to the military intervention against ISIL which was downgraded following the Saudi Arabian-led intervention in Yemen. Possible direct involvement in the war in Syria has unsettled many Saudis as the war in Yemen appears to be a stalemate and the Saudi economy has been affected by low oil prices.

== Resources involved ==
According to unofficial sources, around 350,000 soldiers, 2,540 warplanes, 20,000 tanks, and 460 helicopters will participate in the largest military exercise in the history of the region. Jane's Defence Weekly noted that based on official media releases the exercise appeared smaller than Bright Star 2000, which was held in Egypt in 1999 and involved around 73,000 troops from 11 countries.

== Manoeuvres executed ==
The exercise commenced on 14 February 2016 and concluded on 10 March near King Khaled Military City in northeastern Saudi Arabia, with the participation of various military disciplines of artillery, tanks, and infantry, and air defense systems, naval forces.

== See also ==
- Saudi Arabian-led intervention in Yemen
- Military of the Arab League
- Syrian Civil War
- Military intervention against ISIL
- Iraqi Civil War
- War on terror
- Iraqi insurgency (2011–2013)
