= Salah Mohammed Tubaigy =

Assassin of Jamal Khashoggi (born 1971)

- صلاح بن محمد بن عبده الطبيقي
- Born: 20 August 1971 (age 55); Jizan, Saudi Arabia
- Occupations: Forensic specialist, colonel in the armed forces of Saudi Arabia
- Known for: Involvement in the assassination of Jamal Khashoggi
- Criminal charge: Assassination
- Penalty: Death (pardoned)

Salah Mohammed Abdah Al Tubaigy (Arabic: صلاح الطبيقي, born 20 August 1971), also spelled Tubaiqi, is a Saudi forensic doctor. He was the head of the Saudi Scientific Council of Forensics and a colonel in the armed forces of Saudi Arabia.

In 2019 Tubaigy was sentenced to death for his involvement in the assassination of Jamal Khashoggi, but was pardoned the following year by Khashoggi's children.

== Biography ==
Tubaigy was a professor in the criminal evidence department at Naif Arab University for Security Sciences in Riyadh, and was known for pioneering rapid and mobile autopsies. He taught and published papers on gathering DNA evidence and dissecting human bodies and had a prominent role in Saudi Arabia's state security apparatus and scientific community for around 20 years. He designed a mobile autopsy lab to accompany Muslims on the hajj to Mecca, and said it can "provide the dissection service to the authorities in a record time." For three months, from June 2015, he studied at the Victorian Institute of Forensic Medicine in Melbourne, Australia.

In 2018 Al Jazeera reported that Tubaigy was involved in the murder and dismembering of Jamal Khashoggi. A source said "Tubaigy began to cut Khashoggi’s body up on a table in the study while he was still alive... As he started to dismember the body, Tubaigy put on earphones and listened to music. He advised other members of the squad to do the same."

Tubaigy served on the editorial board to the King Fahd Security College. In late October 2018, his name was removed from the publication's website.

In April 2019, as a response to the murder of Jamal Khashoggi, the United States banned Tubaigy and 15 others (including Saud al-Qahtani) from entering the country.

On 23 December 2019, Tubaigy was one of five people sentenced to death for carrying out Khashoggi's killing. He was then pardoned by Khashoggi's children on 20 May 2020.

== See also ==
- Corrupt
- Government corruption
- Police corruption
