= The Dissident =

2020 American documentary film by Bryan Fogel

- Promotional poster
- Directed by: Bryan Fogel
- Produced by: Bryan Fogel; Jake Swantko; Mark Monroe; Thor Halvorssen
- Cinematography: Jake Swantko
- Edited by: James Leche; Wyatt Rogowski; Avner Shiloah; Scott Hanson; Naeem Raza
- Music by: Adam Peters
- Production companies: Orwell Productions; Human Rights Foundation
- Distributed by: Briarcliff Entertainment
- Release dates: January 24, 2020 (Sundance); December 25, 2020 (United States)
- Running time: 119 minutes
- Country: United States
- Languages: Arabic; Turkish; English
- Box office: $92,688

The Dissident is a 2020 American documentary film directed and produced by Bryan Fogel. It follows the assassination of Jamal Khashoggi and Saudi Arabia's effort to control international dissent.

The film had its world premiere at the Sundance Film Festival on January 24, 2020. It was released in a limited release on December 25, 2020, followed by video on demand on January 8, 2021, by Briarcliff Entertainment.

== Synopsis ==
The film follows the assassination of Jamal Khashoggi and Saudi Arabia's effort to control international dissent. Central to the documentary is the story of the Saudi activist and video blogger, Omar Abdulaziz.

According to Bryan Fogel, the movie's aim is to look "deeply into Khashoggi's murder and the ramifications of it." While a CIA report released by the Biden administration implicated Saudi crown prince Mohammed bin Salman in the death of Khashoggi, Fogel believes the prince will never face an Interpol arrest warrant or formal investigation considering the vast amount of wealth he owns.

== Release ==
The film had its world premiere at the Sundance Film Festival on January 24, 2020. In September 2020, Briarcliff Entertainment acquired distribution rights to the film. It was released in a limited release on December 25, 2020, followed by video on demand on January 8, 2021.

The film struggled to find a distributor for eight months and was not able to run on a large streaming platform like Netflix or Amazon Prime Video. It is widely believed this was due to those platforms' fear of offending the Saudi Arabian government and possibly losing subscribers.

Fogel showed disappointment at The Washington Post owner Jeff Bezos’ decision to acquire UAE e-commerce site Souq.com shortly after he refused to release The Dissident on Amazon Prime Video.

== Reception ==
=== VOD sales ===
In its first weekend of home release, the film was the third-most rented title at the iTunes Store and eighth on Apple TV.

=== Critical response ===
On Rotten Tomatoes the film holds an approval rating of 96% based on 93 reviews, with an average rating of 7.9/10. The website's critics consensus reads, "The Dissident offers little catharsis in its unflinching look at a grisly murder—and gives no quarter in its forceful reminder of the fragility of free speech." On Metacritic, the film has a weighted average score of 82 out of 100, based on 15 critics, indicating "universal acclaim".

Jordan Hoffman of Screen International gave the film a positive review, writing: "The Dissident holds few new revelations but presents its case with enough infuriating evidence and storytelling power to make it worthwhile. Todd McCarthy of The Hollywood Reporter wrote "Fogel's investigation is vigorous, deep and comprehensive." Owen Gleiberman, reviewing the film in Variety, called it "an eye-opening thriller brew of corruption, cover-up, and real-world courage."

Joseph Fahima of Middle East Eye gave the documentary a negative review, qualifying it as an "over-polished piece, which intentionally omits the less flattering aspects of [Khashoggi] story to deliver a more marketable product" and arguing that the "theatrical tone prioritises atmosphere, emotional engagement, and mundane cinematic flourishes over well-rounded truth".

=== Alleged manipulation ===
The filmmakers told The Washington Post that they believed trolls operating on behalf of the Saudi government created a false sense of popular disapproval of the film by flooding the review sites Rotten Tomatoes and IMDb. Tiyson Reynolds from Rotten Tomatoes said "it appears that there have been deliberate attempts to manipulate the movie's audience score".

=== Accolades ===
Award	Date of ceremony	Category	Recipient(s)	Result	Ref.
ACE Eddie Awards	April 17, 2021	Best Edited Documentary (Feature)	Scott D. Hanson, James Leche, Wyatt Rogowski, and Avner Shiloah	Nominated	
British Academy Film Awards	April 10–11, 2021	Best Documentary	Bryan Fogel, Thor Halvorssen, Mark Monroe, and Jake Swantko	Nominated	
Cinema Eye Honors	March 9, 2021	Outstanding Production	Bryan Fogel, Thor Halvorssen, Mark Monroe, and Jake Swantko	Nominated	
Cinema for Peace Awards		Award for Justice	The Dissident	Won	
Dallas–Fort Worth Film Critics Association	February 11, 2021	Best Documentary Film	The Dissident	4th place	
Detroit Film Critics Society	March 8, 2021	Best Documentary	The Dissident	Nominated	
Dublin International Film Festival	March 14, 2021	Irish Council for Civil Liberties (ICCL) Human Rights Film Award	The Dissident	Won	
Dublin International Film Festival	March 14, 2021	Special Jury Prize	The Dissident	Won	
Georgia Film Critics Association	March 12, 2021	Best Documentary Film	The Dissident	Nominated	
Satellite Awards	February 15, 2021	Best Motion Picture, Documentary	The Dissident	Nominated	
Writers Guild of America Awards	March 21, 2021	Best Documentary Screenplay	Mark Monroe and Bryan Fogel	Won	

== See also ==
- Death of a Princess, a 1980 British drama-documentary protested by the Saudi government
