= Ahmad Asiri =

Saudi major general (born 1952)

- أحمد عسيري

Deputy Director of the General Intelligence Presidency
- In office 22 April 2016 – 29 October 2018

Spokesperson of the Saudi Led Coalition
- In office 26 March 2015 – 27 July 2017
- Preceded by: Office Established
- Succeeded by: Turki al-Maliki

Personal details
- Born: Ahmad Hassan Mohammad Asiri; 12 February 1952 (age 74) Mahayel Asir, Asir province, Saudi Arabia

Military service
- Allegiance: Saudi Arabia
- Branch/service: Royal Saudi Air Defense
- Rank: Major General
- Battles/wars: Gulf War; Yemeni civil war; Saudi-led intervention

Major General Ahmad Hassan Mohammad Asiri (Arabic: أحمد حسن محمد عسيري; born 12 February 1952) is a Saudi Arabian military officer. He is a close confidant and adviser to Saudi crown prince Mohammed bin Salman and the former deputy head of the General Intelligence Presidency. He was also the former spokesman for the Saudi-led coalition in Yemen, a position he served from the beginning of the Saudi intervention until 27 July 2017, when he was replaced by Colonel Turki bin Saleh al-Malki.

In February 2021, the United States Treasury announced sanctions against Asiri for his involvement of the assassination of Jamal Khashoggi.

== Yemen war ==
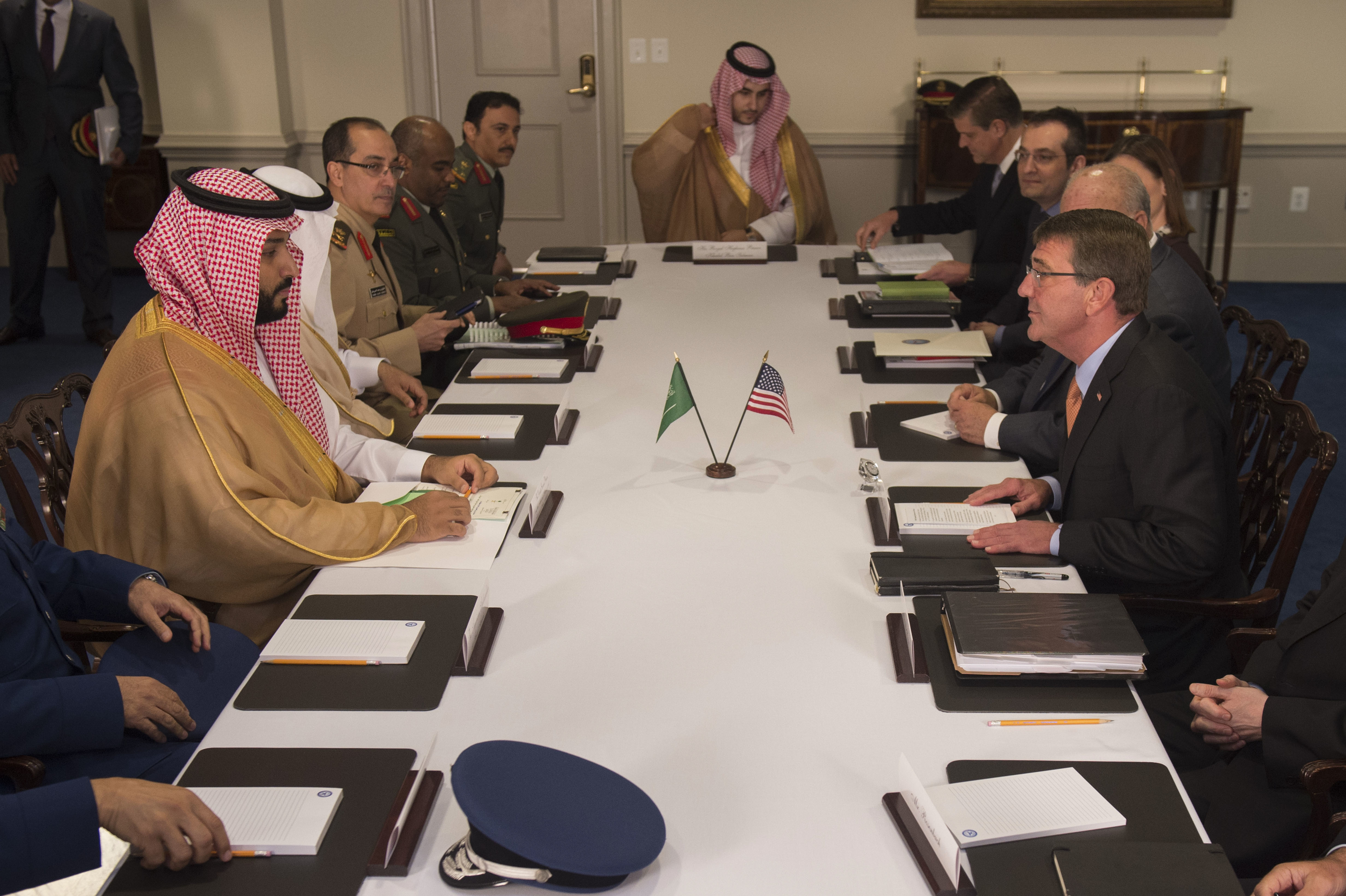
Mohammed bin Salman and Ahmad Asiri meeting US Secretary of Defense Ash Carter, 2016

Brigadier-General Asiri is the former spokesman of the Saudi-led coalition in Yemen, during the Yemeni Civil War.

On 8 May 2015, the Saudi-led coalition declared the entire Houthi stronghold cities of Sa'dah and Marran to be military targets. Asiri issued what became known as the May Declaration, telling the media: "Starting today and as you all remember we have declared through media platforms and through the leaflets that were dropped on Marran and Saada, and prior warnings to Yemeni civilians in those two cities, to get away from those cities where operations will take place. This warning will end at 7 p.m. today and coalitions forces will immediately respond to the actions of these militias that targeted the security and safety of the Saudi citizens from now and until the objectives of this operation are reached. We have also declared Saada and Marran as military targets loyal to the Houthi militias and as a result the operations will cover the whole area of those two cities and thus we repeat our call to the civilians to stay away from these groups, and leave the areas under Houthi control or where the Houthis are taking shelter."

The May declaration was criticised by Human Rights Watch who said: "Several attacks on apparently civilian objects that Human Rights Watch investigated in Saada, including an attack that struck a residential house, two attacks that struck markets, and an attack on a school, took place after 8 May announcement. Issuing warning of impending attacks to the civilian population is in line with the obligation under the laws of war to take all feasible precautions to minimize civilian harm, and in particular to provide "effective advance warning" of attacks that may affect the civilian population, so long as circumstances permit. However, the general and vague nature of these warnings would be of little help to civilians in need of greater security. Even more problematic, and a clear violation of the laws of war, is the coalition assertion that the entire cities of Saada and Marran are military targets. The laws of war prohibit attacks that treat as a single military objective a number of clearly separated and distinct military objectives located in a city, town, village or other area containing a similar concentration of civilians or civilian objects.

In February 2016, Asiri declared: "Now our rules of engagement are: you are close to the border, you are killed." This statement was once again criticised by Human Rights Watch who replied: "Treating an entire area as the object of military attack violates the laws-of-war prohibition on attacks that treat distinct military objectives in a city, town or area as a single military objective. Doing so unlawfully denies civilians protection from attack.

In March 2017, Asiri, at a think tank forum in London, was the target of Sam Walton, a UK peace activist's attempt at a citizen's arrest over the Yemen war atrocities. Asiri shouted to the crowd outside the building and gave them the middle finger.

== Iran ==
In January 2017, George Nader arranged several meetings between among others, himself, Asiri, Joel Zamel, Steve Bannon and Michael Flynn. The purpose of the meetings was to investigate regime change in Iran.

== Israel ==
According to The Wall Street Journal, Asiri had been instrumental in forging closer ties between Israel and Saudi Arabia. Asiri is reported to have secretly traveled to Israel for meetings with officials several times, being the highest placed Saudi−Arabian to do so. After the murder of Jamal Khashoggi, this relationship has been "put on hold", as the Saudis feared backlash.

== Assassination of Jamal Khashoggi ==
In October 2018, the daily newspaper al-Waqt quoted informed sources as saying that the crown prince Mohammad bin Salman had assigned Asiri with the mission to execute dissident journalist Jamal Khashoggi inside the Saudi consulate in Istanbul, Turkey. Another military officer with much experience in dealing with dissidents was the second candidate for the mission.

American television journalist Rachel Maddow pointed to reports by foreign affairs columnist David Ignatius explaining that Asiri planned to create a "tiger team" for covert Special operations. As "informed sources" in Washington were trying to work out who the possible scapegoat for the Khashoggi execution might be, and because Asiri also was the "point of contact" for crown prince Mohammad's offers of help to the 2016 Trump presidential campaign, which were part of Robert Mueller's investigation. Asiri would be the "two birds with one stone" cover up story. But retired US diplomats, like Barbara Bodine, a retired US ambassador to Yemen, and intelligence officials, like Bruce Riedel, a former CIA official at the Brookings Institution, were "already signalling that the line is a nonstarter".

At the same time Saudi rulers admitted to Khashoggi's killing in the Istanbul consulate, they presented to the world on 19 October 2018 a number of alleged perpetrators. Eighteen men were arrested and five high-ranking state employees dismissed. Asiri was one of those who were sacked.

In 2019, it was reported that Asiri had been "put on trial but acquitted", due to "insufficient evidence". French Human Rights expert Agnès Callamard called the Saudi trials after the Khashoggi murders for "the antithesis of justice", and "a mockery".

In February 2021, the United States Treasury announced sanctions against Asiri for his involvement of the killing of Khashoggi.

== See also ==
- Exercise North Thunder
- Tiger Squad
