= Detroit Film Critics Society Award for Best Documentary =

Award for documentary films

The Detroit Film Critics Society Award for Best Documentary is an annual award given by the Detroit Film Critics Society.

== History ==
It honors the best documentary film of that year since its inception in 2011 with the first winner being Errol Morris's Tabloid.

== Winners ==
- 2011: Tabloid
  - Into Eternity
  - Into the Abyss
  - Marwencol
  - We Were Here
- 2012: Jiro Dreams of Sushi
  - The House I Live In
  - The Imposter
  - The Queen of Versailles
  - Searching for Sugar Man
- 2013: Stories We Tell
  - Blackfish
  - The Act of Killing
  - The Square
  - The Unknown Known
- 2014: Citizenfour
  - Finding Vivian Maier
  - Jodorowsky’s Dune
  - Keep On Keepin’ On
  - Life Itself
- 2015: Amy
  - Best of Enemies
  - Going Clear: Scientology and the Prison of Belief
  - Listen to Me Marlon
  - The Look of Silence
- 2016: O.J.: Made in America
  - 13th
  - Gleason
  - Life, Animated
  - Tickled
  - Weiner
- 2017: Jim and Andy: The Great Beyond
  - The Defiant Ones
  - Human Flow
  - Kedi
  - Step
  - Strong Island
  - Whose Streets?
- 2018: Three Identical Strangers
  - Free Solo
  - RBG
  - Whitney
  - Won't You Be My Neighbor?
- 2019: Apollo 11
  - Amazing Grace
  - Horror Noire: A History of Black Horror
  - Knock Down the House
  - Rolling Thunder Revue: A Bob Dylan Story by Martin Scorsese
- 2020: Dick Johnson Is Dead
  - All In: The Fight for Democracy
  - Boys State
  - The Dissident
  - Time
- 2021: Flee and Summer of Soul (...Or, When the Revolution Could Not Be Televised)
  - Roadrunner: A Film About Anthony Bourdain
  - The Sparks Brothers
  - Street Gang: How We Got to Sesame Street

== See also ==
- Academy Award for Best Documentary Feature
