= Saad bin Khalid Al Jabri =

Saudi general

- سعد بن خالد الجبري
- Born: 1959 (age 66–67); Ha'il, Saudi Arabia
- Years active: Late 1990s–2017
- Spouse: Nadyah
- Children: 8

Saad bin Khalid Al Jabri (Arabic: سعد بن خالد الجبري) is a former major-general, minister of state and long-time adviser to deposed Crown Prince Muhammad bin Nayef of Saudi Arabia. He has been living in exile in Canada since May 2017. The Saudi government has unsuccessfully sought to have him extradited back to Saudi Arabia on charges of corruption. Al Jabri has accused the Saudi government of orchestrating assassination attempts on him and of holding 3 of his children, along with other relatives, as hostages in a bid to force his return.

== Early life and education ==
Al Jabri spent his early years in Ha'il. To support his family, following the death of his father, he enrolled at a police academy, then worked as a police officer in Taif while studying in his free time.

Al Jabri obtained a bachelor's degree in Security Sciences from King Fahd Security College in Riyadh. He obtained a further bachelor's degree in Arabic language and literature from Imam Muhammad bin Saud Islamic University, and a diploma in computer programming from the Institute of Public Administration in Riyadh.

He studied for a master's degree in computer science at college in Dhahran, following which he was involved in the founding of a computer science program at King Fahd Security College. In 1993 he enrolled at the University of Edinburgh, receiving his PhD in artificial intelligence in 1997.

== Career ==
Following the completion of his doctoral studies Al Jabri went, at the behest of then-minister of interior Nayef bin Abdulaziz Al Saud, to work within the ministry of interior where he taught at the King Fahd Security College.

Over the following two decades Al Jabri became an ally and key adviser to Muhammad bin Nayef. He was a mainstay link between Saudi Arabia and western intelligence agencies, including the Five Eyes alliance, and was credited with helping Muhammad bin Nayef transform and modernise the Saudi security services and their counter-terrorism methods.

As of 2003 Al Jabri was the chief of staff and following the Riyadh compound bombings their focus shifted to Al-Qaeda. Changes to counter-terrorism methods were introduced including rehabilitation programs and closer information sharing with western intelligence agencies. It is claimed the reforms were instrumental in the foiling of the 2010 transatlantic aircraft bomb plot.

In July 2015, and with the agreement of then-minister of interior and Crown Prince Muhammad bin Nayef, Al Jabri attended meetings with then-CIA Director John Brennan at CIA headquarters and British Foreign Secretary Philip Hammond in London. The following month he visited the White House to discuss the Saudi Arabian-led intervention in Yemen. Despite briefing the royal court upon his return it is alleged that Mohammed bin Salman felt Al Jabri was "plotting" with bin Nayef against him. He was dismissed from his governmental positions on 10 September 2015.

== Exile ==
After his dismissal from government, Al Jabri continued advising Mohammed bin Nayef in a personal capacity until he departed Saudi Arabia on 17 May 2017. He remained abroad following the ousting of Muhammad bin Nayef as Crown Prince the following month and later took refuge in Canada. Thomas Juneau, an associate professor at the University of Ottawa, stated that Al Jabri and other Saudis who had fled the kingdom were justifiably concerned about their safety. Bruce Riedel, a former CIA analyst and director of the Brookings Intelligence Project, explained why Al Jabri kept a low profile after arriving in Canada: "I think he's scared. Wouldn't you be?"

In September 2017, Al Jabri's son-in-law, Salem Almuzaini, was allegedly rendered from Dubai to Saudi Arabia. His wife was in Turkey at the time and he tried to persuade her to attend the Saudi Consulate in Istanbul from where, Khalid al-Jabri suspects, she would have been abducted.

On 16 March 2020 two of his children, Sarah and Omar, who were already barred from leaving the Kingdom, were detained by Saudi security officers. Their elder brother Khalid Al Jabri believes that they were to be used as bargaining chips to force their father to return to Saudi Arabia.

The family sought the assistance of the US authorities in their quest for information about the pair and Tim Rieser, a senior aide to Senator Patrick Leahy, confirmed that Leahy's office is pushing for both information about their location and their release. Rieser stated, "It seems that they're being used as hostages to try and coerce their father to return to Saudi Arabia".

In May 2020, Al Jabri's brother, Abdulrahman, was also detained.

In June 2020, Lord Hylton asked the Foreign and Commonwealth Office what steps the British government were taking over the arrests of Al Jabri's children and brother, and was duly advised that they are "monitoring this case closely" and are "concerned" about numerous detainees held by the Saudi government.

On 7 July 2020, Senators Patrick Leahy, Tim Kaine, Chris Van Hollen and Marco Rubio wrote to President Donald Trump urging him to press for the release of Al Jabri's children. Calling him a "highly valued partner" they said: "the US has a moral obligation to do what it can to assist in securing his children's freedom". In response, the Department of State noted that it had "repeatedly" requested that Saudi officials "clarify the status" of Al Jabri's children, and undertook to: "continue to engage Saudi counterparts to resolve this situation in a manner that honours Dr Aljabri's service to our country".

In January 2021, around 10 months after being detained, Omar and Sarah were permitted to contact family members in Saudi Arabia. Within the period they were being held at an undisclosed location, both had been convicted of money laundering and attempting to flee the Kingdom. Omar was sentenced to nine years and Sarah to six years and six months. An appeal was lodged and denied; the hearing was held in secret and neither of the siblings or their legal representatives were present.

=== Allegations of corruption ===
In September 2017, Saudi authorities sought Al Jabri's arrest. According to Canadian newspaper, The Globe and Mail, an Interpol Red Notice was requested, whereas The New York Times, which claimed to have viewed relevant Interpol documentation, a less formal 'diffusion' was filed. According to Al Jabri's son, Khalid, the request was viewed as "politically motivated". Al-Jabri successfully petitioned to have his name removed from the Interpol system in July 2018, with the Commission noting "the lack of due process and human rights guarantees" in previous corruption cases.

Despite having no extradition treaty with Canada, Saudi authorities have twice requested that Canada extradite Al Jabri; in 2018 and again in 2019.

The Wall Street Journal reported that Saudi officials claimed that Al Jabri is wanted over missing funds which were allegedly "misused" during his time in the interior ministry. In response to the claims his son, Khalid, stated that the family welcome impartial "due process that doesn't include attempts to induce harm or extortion through child hostage-taking." Following the publication of the claims in The Wall Street Journal, Al Jabri was targeted by "pro-government" Twitter users, in response his son Khalid told Reuters that the campaign was a "deflection from the actual story: hostage taking of my brother and sister, unlawful persecution and false allegations".

=== Assassination attempt ===
A few days after the assassination of Jamal Khashoggi in 2018, Mohammad bin Salman attempted to send Tiger Squad to Canada to assassinate Al Jabri, according to a lawsuit filed under the Torture Victim Protection Act in the United States District Court for the District of Columbia in August 2020. However, border agents at Toronto Pearson International Airport stopped the group and refused them entry into Canada. Described as an "active threat" by Canadian media, further claims of more recent attempts to kill Al Jabri have materialised, leading to him being guarded by the Royal Canadian Mounted Police as well as private security. In response to the claims Bill Blair, Canada's Minister of Public Safety, stated: "we are aware of incidents which foreign actors have attempted to monitor, intimidate or threaten Canadians and those living in Canada [...] we will never tolerate foreign actors threatening Canada's national security or the safety of our citizens and residents".

In October 2021, Al Jabri told Scott Pelley on 60 Minutes that Mohammed bin Salman wants him dead. He referred to bin Salman as "a psychopath (...) with infinite resources." He also pleaded for the United States government to help free his children, detained in Riyadh since March 2020.

== Personal life ==
Al Jabri is married to Nadyah and they have six sons and two daughters.
