= Omar Abdulaziz (vlogger) =

Saudi dissident video blogger and activist

Omar Abdulaziz Al-Zahrani (Arabic: عمر بن عبد العزيز الزهراني) is a Saudi Arabian Canadian dissident video blogger and activist living in exile in Montreal, Canada. As recounted in the film The Dissident (2020), he was close friends and worked with Jamal Khashoggi, dissident Saudi journalist assassinated by Saudi government agents at the Saudi consulate in Istanbul, Turkey. Al-Zahrani is a member of the National Assembly Party.

== Biography ==
He hosts a YouTube satire program known for its criticism of the kingdom and its leadership. Consulting firm McKinsey & Company named Abdulaziz in an internal report as one of the top Saudi influencers on Twitter.

He applied for asylum in Canada in 2014, when his student scholarship was cancelled after he criticised the Saudi government. He became a Canadian permanent resident in 2017.

Abdulaziz was close friends and worked with Jamal Khashoggi—the Saudi dissident and journalist for The Washington Post—on various initiatives after Khashoggi left the kingdom to live in exile in 2017. In 2018 Abdulaziz's phone was hacked and his conversations with Khashoggi were intercepted. Khashoggi was later assassinated by Saudi Arabia. Abdulaziz's two brothers and several friends are imprisoned in their homes in Saudi Arabia because of their links to him.

His story features prominently in the film The Dissident (2020), directed by Bryan Fogel.

According to a 2026 report by The Guardian, Saudi authorities requested that U.S. social media companies block or restrict the accounts of activist Omar Abdulaziz inside the kingdom. In response, Meta restricted access to 108 Instagram accounts and Facebook pages in April 2026—including Abdulaziz's account. Meanwhile, Snapchat removed his account without notifying him.
