= Saudi Arabian Royal Guard =

- الحرس الملكي السعودي
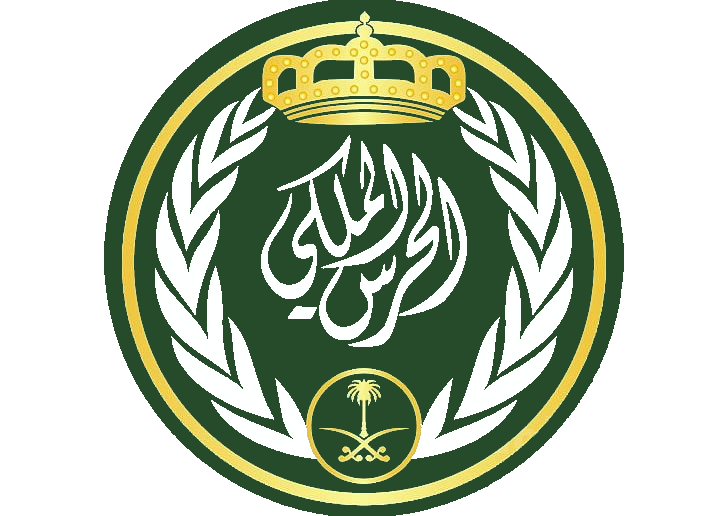
- Active: 3 November 1803 (222 years ago by Imam Saud al Kabeer)
- Country: Kingdom of Saudi Arabia
- Allegiance: King of Saudi Arabia
- Branch: Military Forces; Armed Forces (1803–1953)
- Type: Royal Guard
- Role: Ceremonial guard, light infantry
- Part of: Royal Guard Presidency; Royal Guard Emirate (1953–1964); Ministry of Defense (1933–1953)
- Garrison/HQ: Riyadh

Commanders
- Current commander: General Suheil al-Mutiri

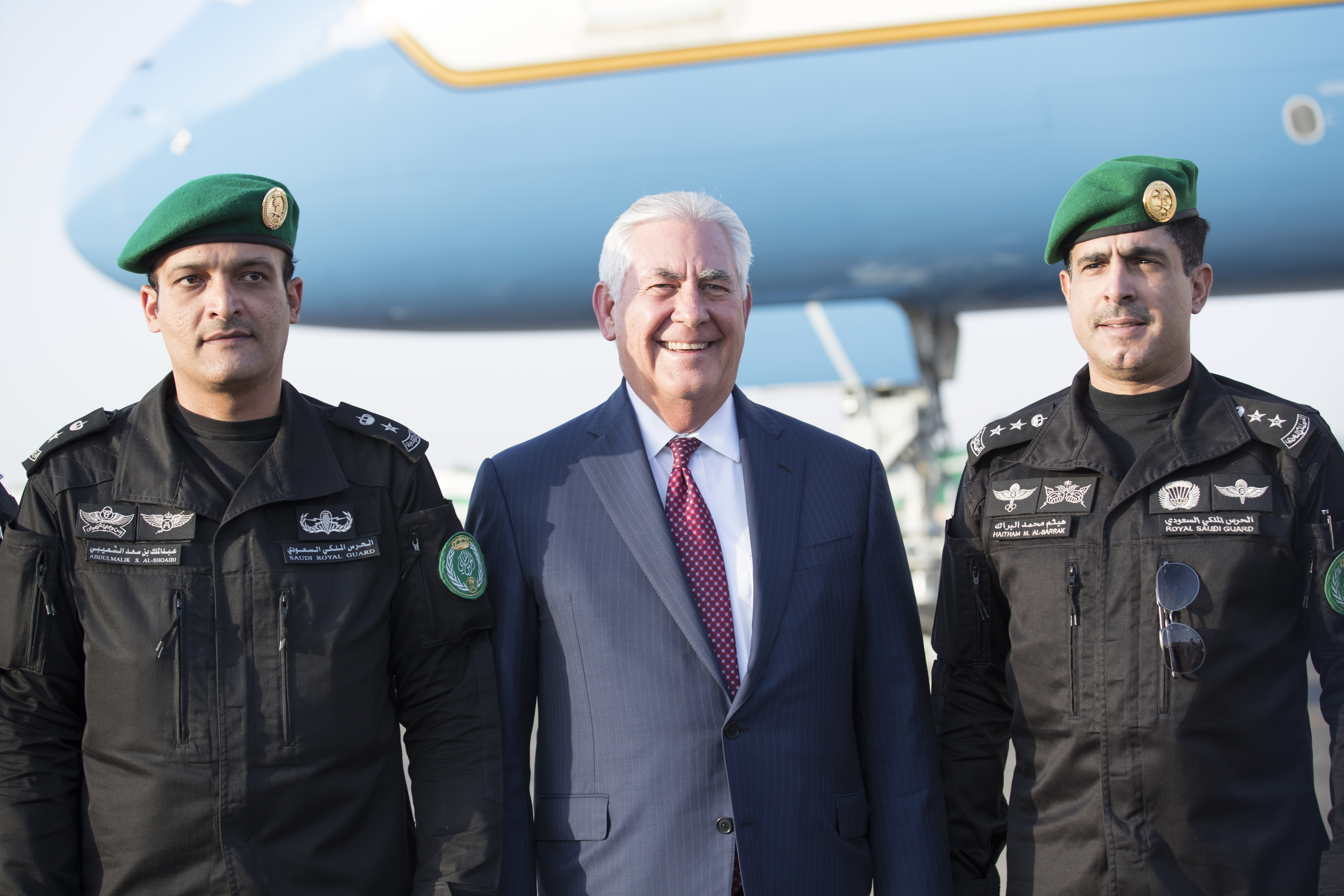
The then US secretary of state, Rex Tillerson posing with members of the royal guard.

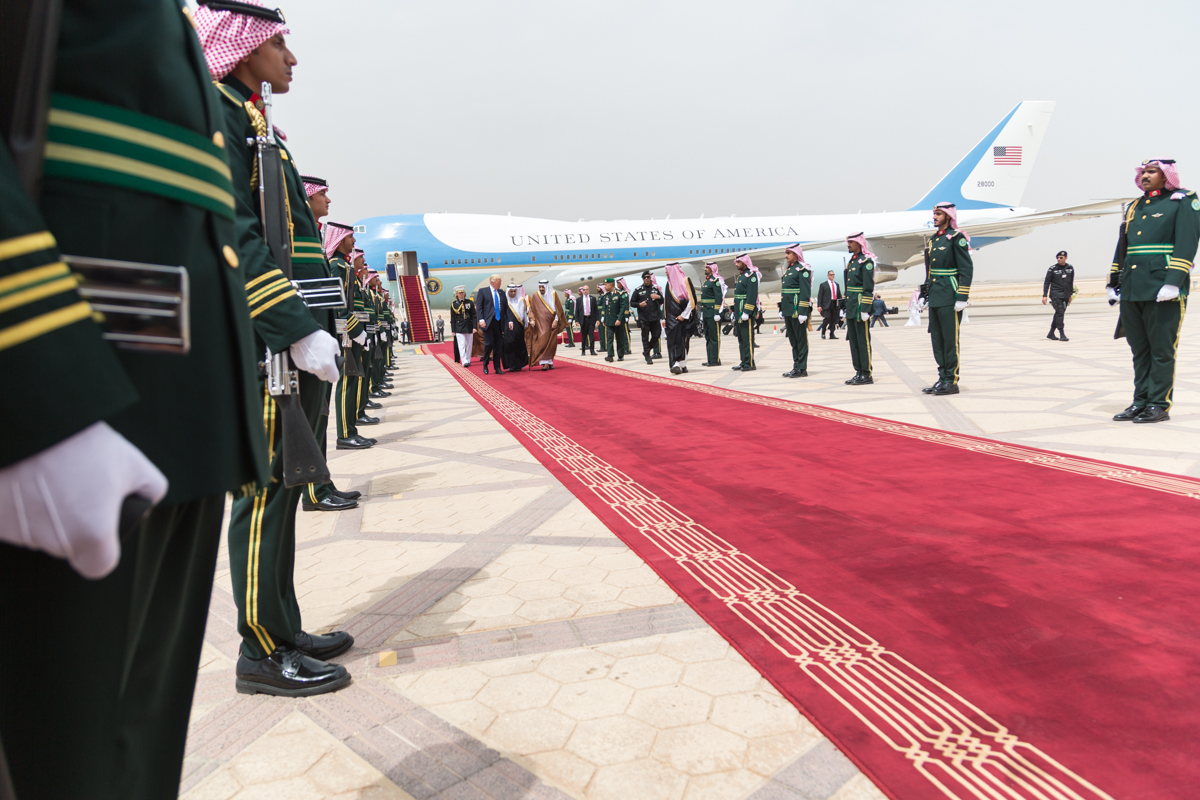
Members of the Saudi Royal Guard Regiment with President Trump and King Salman in May 2017.

The Saudi Arabian Royal Guard (Arabic: الحرس الملكي السعودي, romanized: Al-Ḥars al-Malakī as-Suʿūdī) is a unit in the Saudi Armed Forces. Originally an independent military force, the Royal Guards were incorporated into the Armed Forces since its inception until 1953. The Royal Guards retained their unique mission of protecting the Saudi ruling family. Units of the Royal Guard protect the King of Saudi Arabia and other relatives.

The Royal Guards report directly to the king and for security reasons maintain a separate communications network from the regular army.

Members of the Royal Guard Regiment often wear the flowing white thaub (robe) and white kaffiyah and qhutrah (traditional Arab headgear of skullcap and scarf). Royal Guardsmen wear bright green berets when in conventional uniform.

The Royal Guard Regiment consists of three light infantry battalions, based near Riyadh. The commander of the Royal Guard is General Suheil al-Mutiri.

== Mission, Engagement and Responsibilities of the Royal Guard ==
=== Mission ===
To carry out all procedures and use all available means to ensure the security and protection of the King and the Crown Prince within and outside the Kingdom of Saudi Arabia.

The head of the royal guard is directly linked to the Saudi king.

=== Duties ===
- To provide security and guardianship of the King and Crown Prince wherever he may be in the Kingdom and abroad and in all his movements and means of transportation.
- Provide security and guardians to the King's guests wherever they are in the Kingdom.
- Providing security and guarding for all the places they visit within the Kingdom.
- Providing security and guarding for the King and his guests during celebrations and conferences held in the Kingdom in conjunction with other security services.
- To provide security and guard for all dawawins and royal palaces in different cities of the Kingdom.
- To provide security and guardianship to His Highness the Crown Prince while he is in the company of the King or wherever he is and falls under the responsibility of the Royal Guard.
- Follow-up all employees in the various royal courts and palaces, the Council of Ministers and all the places where the King is present and grant them entry cards to those places after being confirmed in security terms.
- Coordination with the Royal Protocol and the Office of Citizens' Affairs regarding the king's interviews with citizens and other dignitaries and foreigners.
- Perform any other duties that may be assigned to the Royal Guard.
- Provide security and guardians for members of the royal family and officials in the State when traveling on missions outside the Kingdom.
- Conducting all ceremonies for the reception and farewell of the guests of the Kingdom of Saudi Arabia within the Kingdom and the ceremony for the presentation of the credentials of the Ambassadors by the Honor Guards, Royal Protocol and Al-Fursan Guards.
- To carry out all ceremonies related to ceremonies and conferences attended by the King or his representative in the event that the officials so request.
- Coordinate with all the security services in the various celebrations and events held in the Kingdom to develop joint security plans to provide security and protection to the King and all his accompanying officials and VIPs.
- Participate with the other armed forces sectors in any combat operations appropriate to the tasks and arming the Royal Guard.

== Uniforms ==
The military uniform of the Royal Guard consists of four models:

- the official model, the dark green shirt and pants, and the green (wild) head hat,
- the administrative model, the light green shirt, the dark green pants, and the green (wild) head hat,
- the combat model, the camouflage suit, the green beret, and
- The Special Guard, black shirt, black pants, and black beret, for the Protection and Reinforcement Unit and Battalion, and the close protection units for the King and senior guests of kings and heads of state.

== Ranks ==
Officers

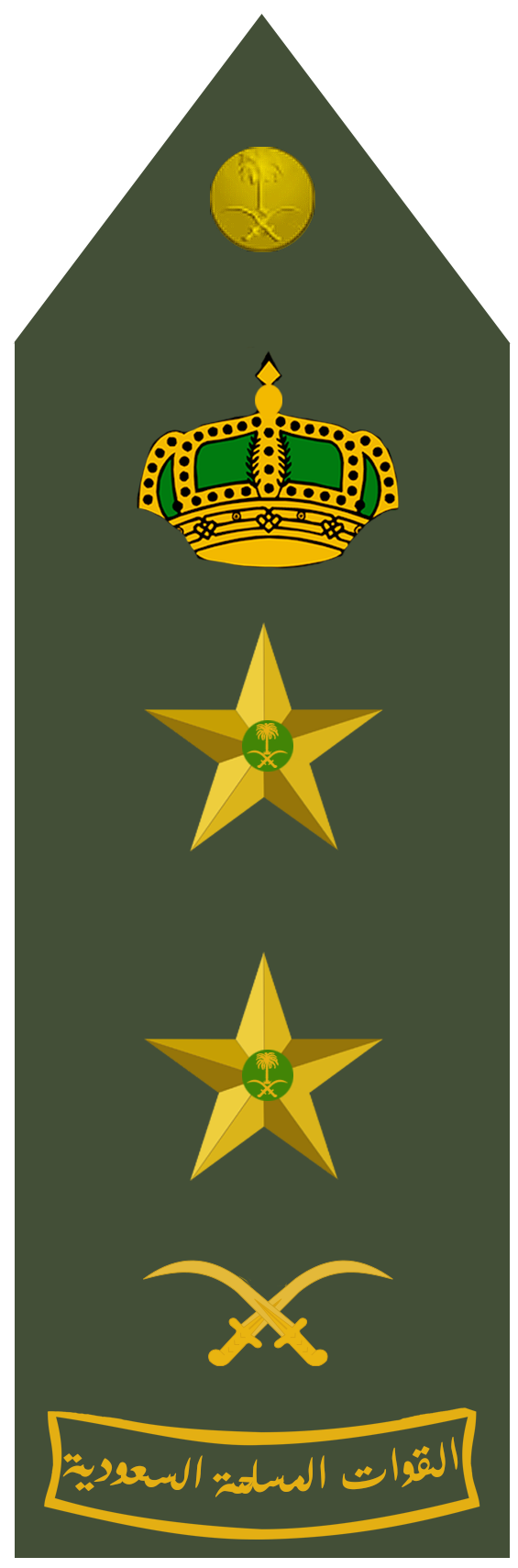
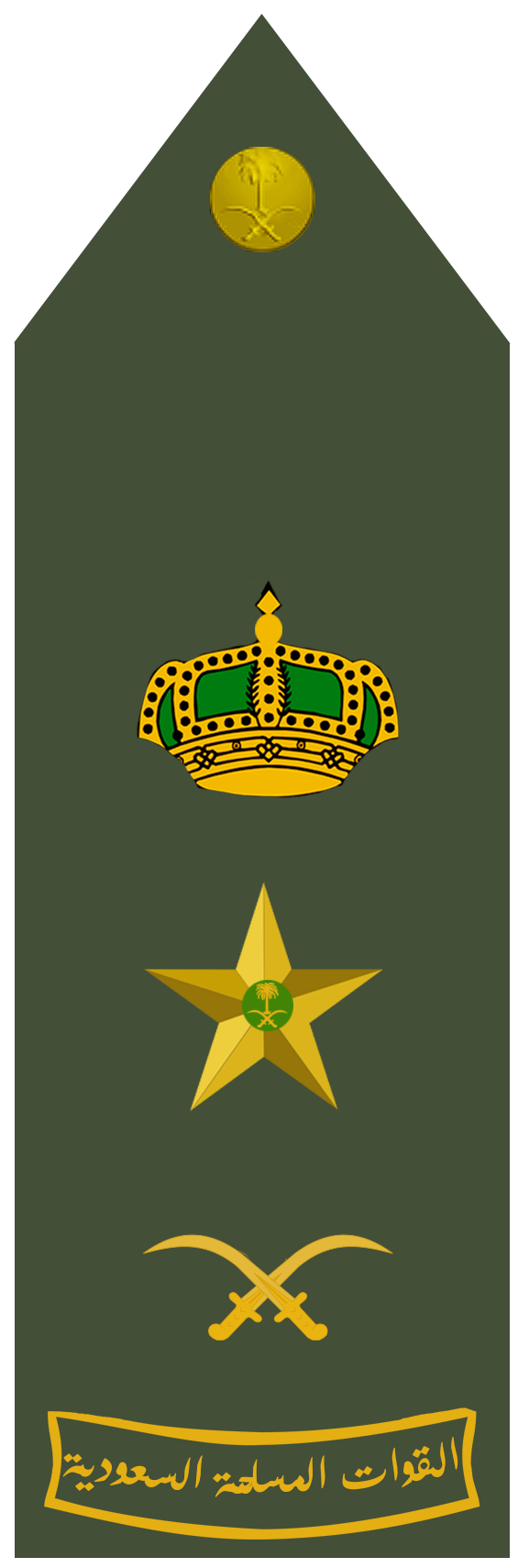
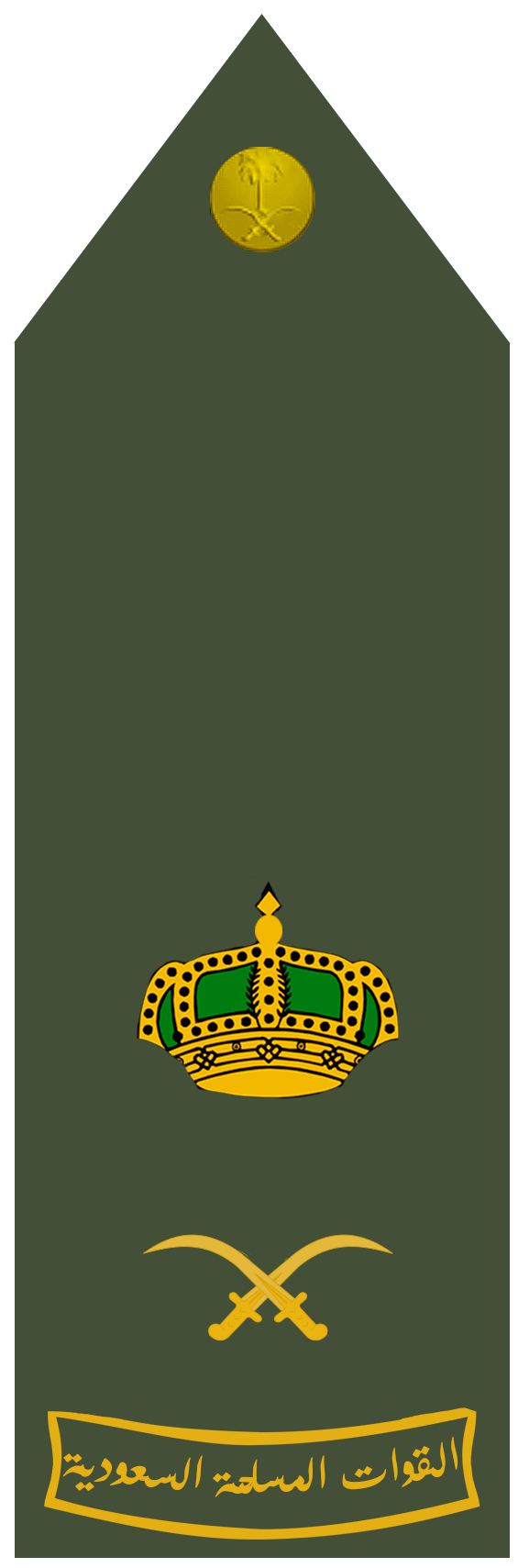
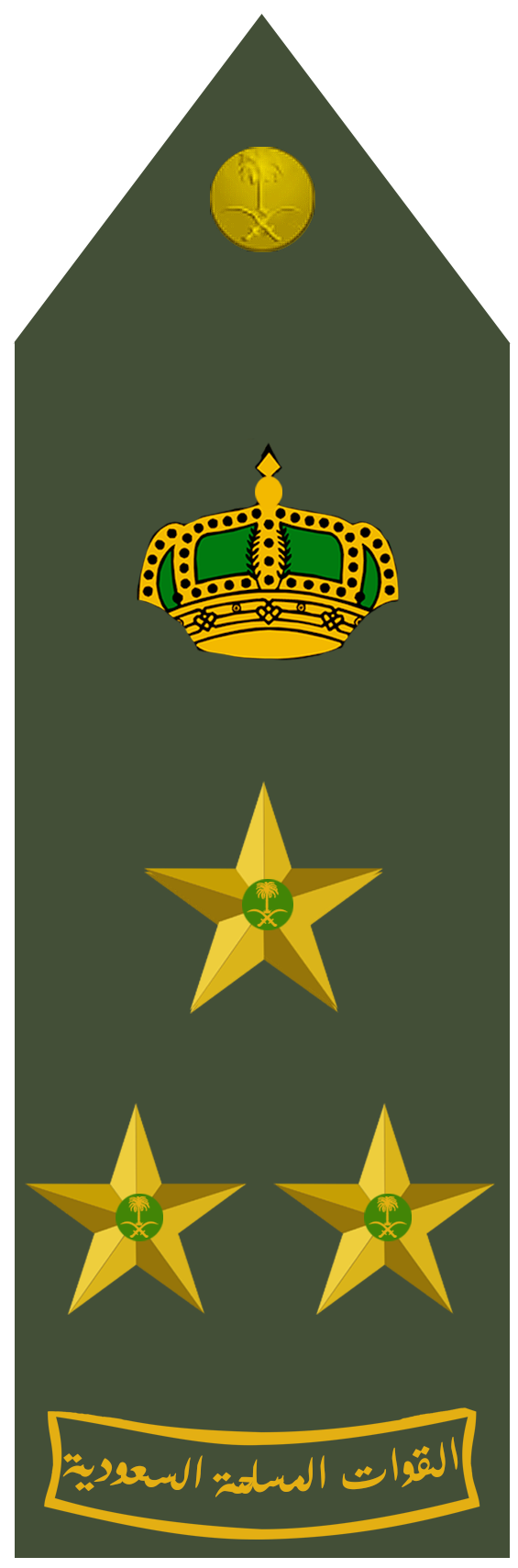
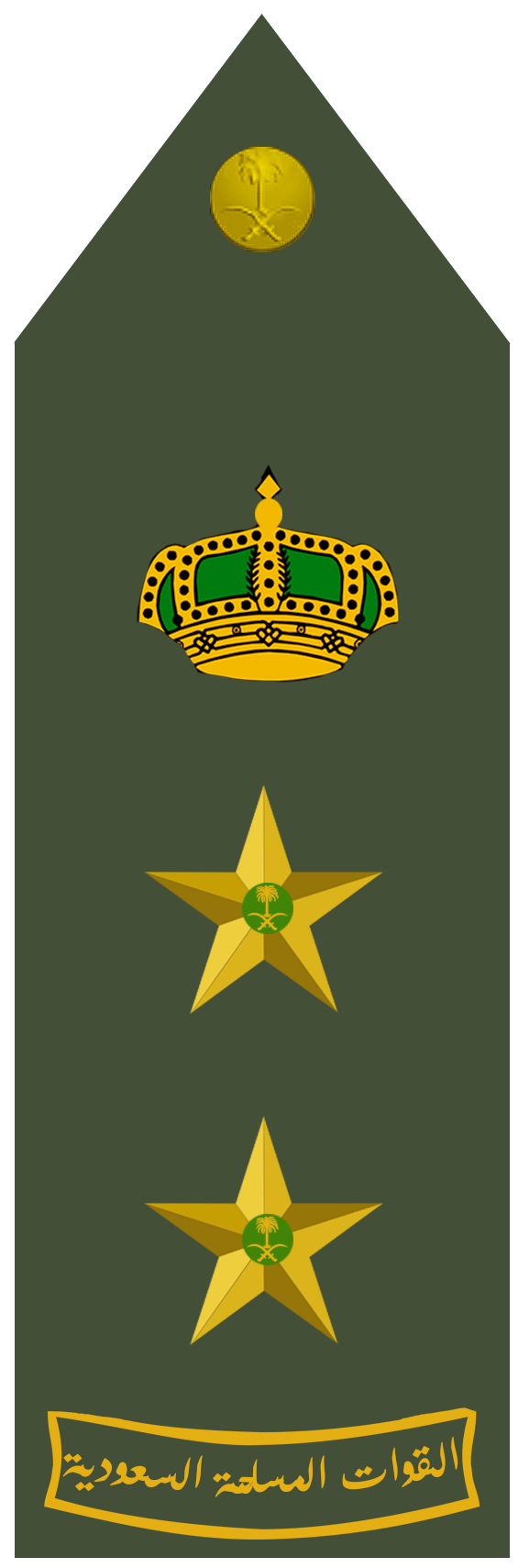
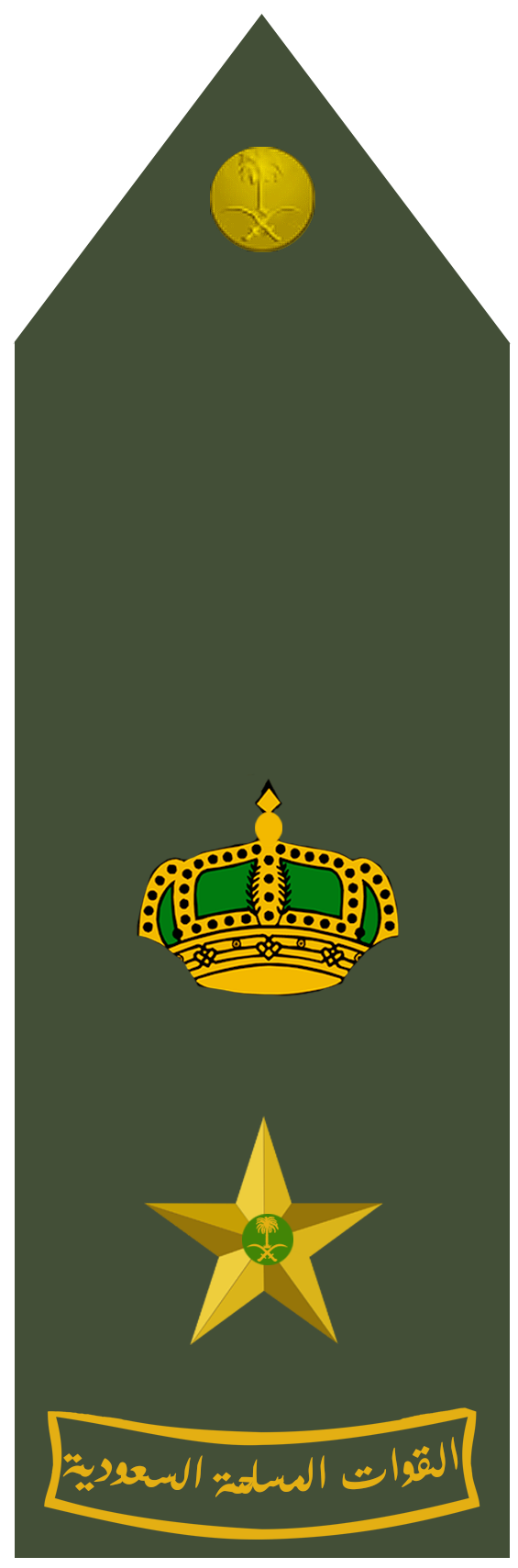
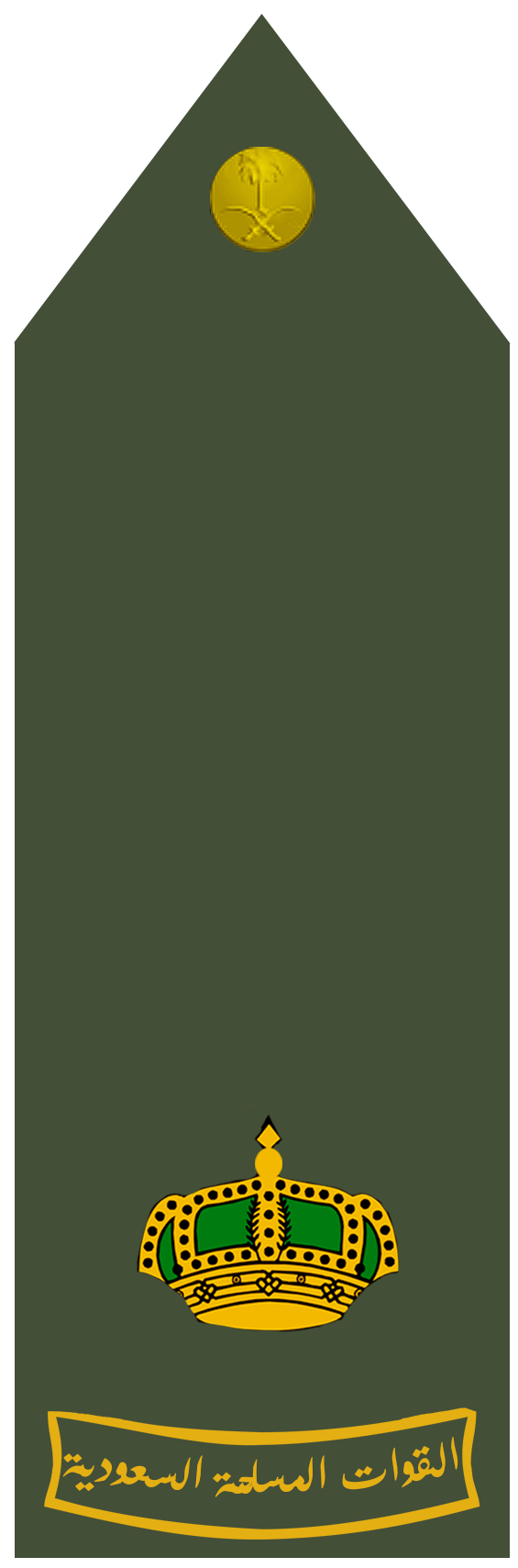
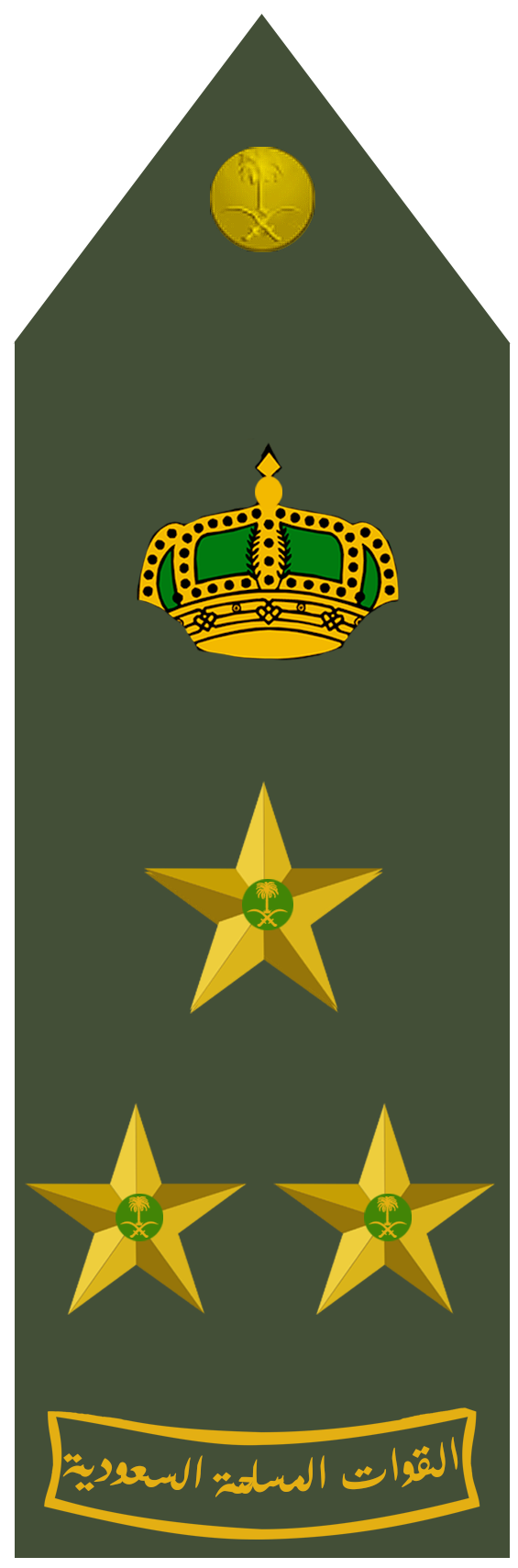
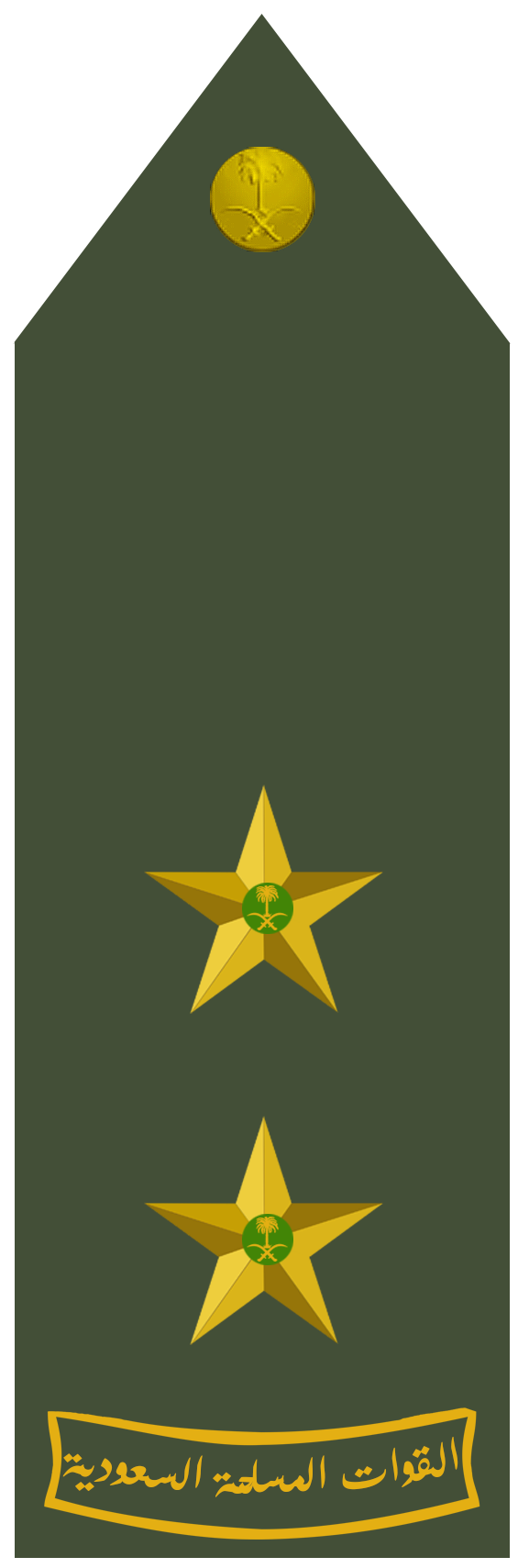
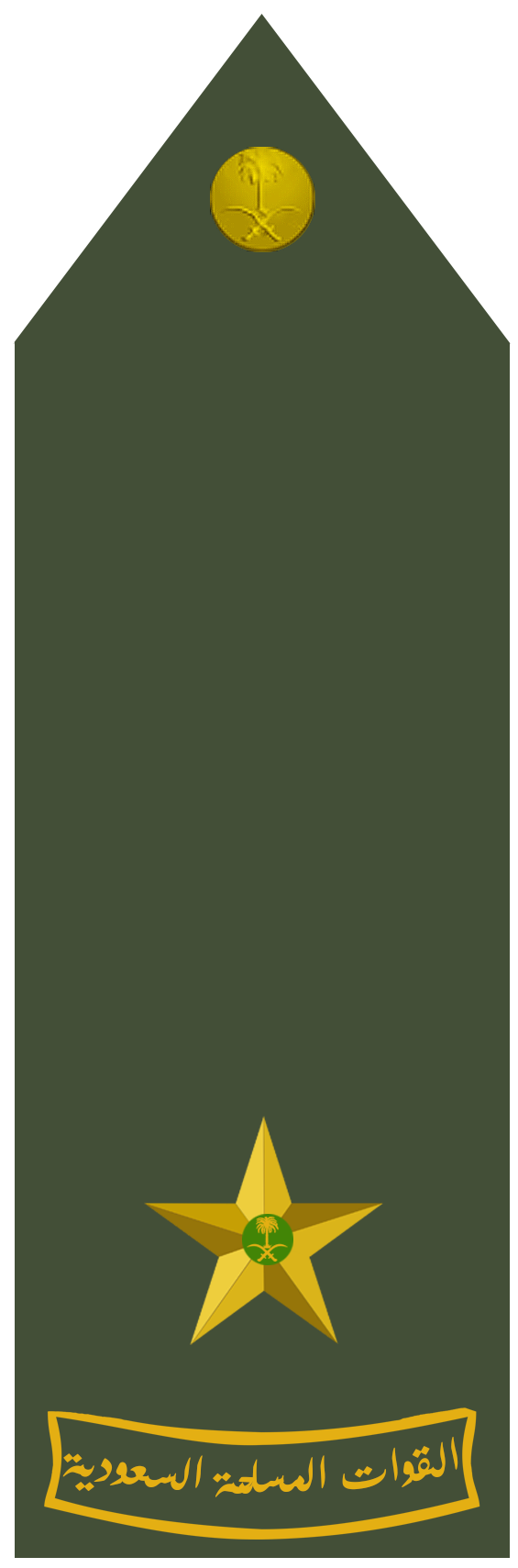
Rank group	General / flag officers				Senior officers			Junior officers
Saudi Arabian Royal Guard
Saudi Arabian Royal Guard	فريق أول; Fariq 'awal	فريق; Fariq	لواء; Liwa	عميد; Amid	عقيد; Aqid	مقدم; Muqaddam	رائد; Ra'id	نقيب; Naqib	ملازم أول; Mulazim awwal	ملازم; Mulazim

Enlisted

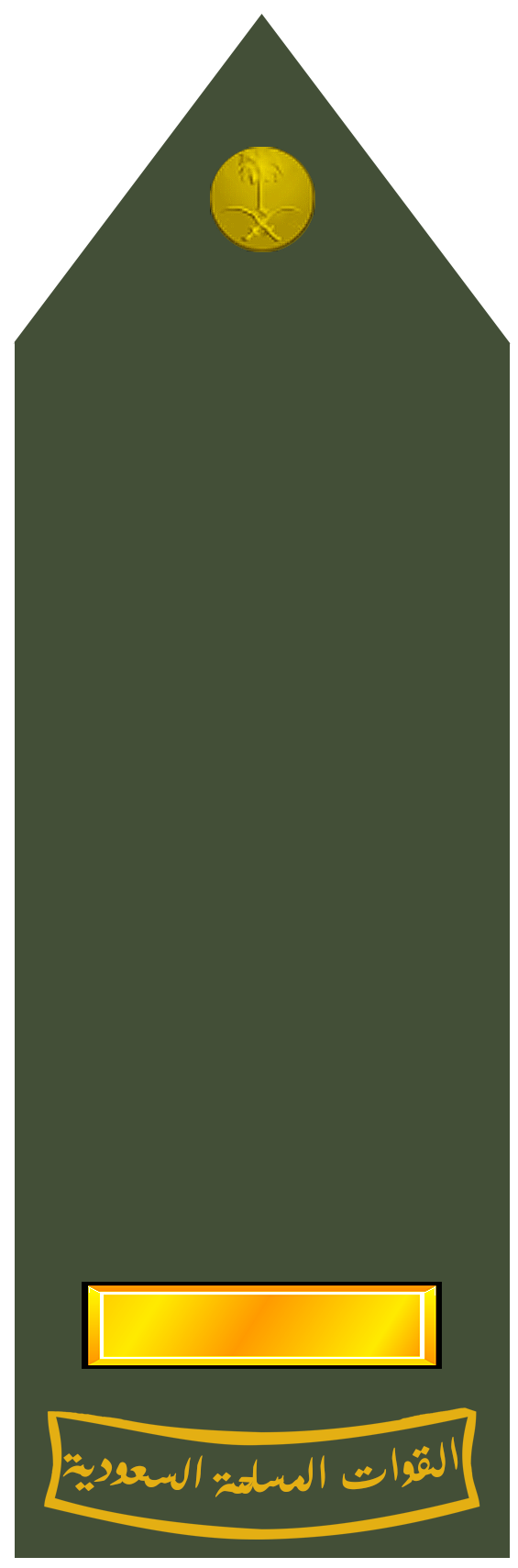
Rank group	Senior NCOs				Junior NCOs	Enlisted
Saudi Arabian Royal Guard							No insignia
Saudi Arabian Royal Guard	رئيس رقباء; Rayiys ruqaba'	رقيب أول; Raqib 'awal	رقيب; Raqib	وكيل رقيب; Wakil raqib	عريف; Earif	جندي أول; Jundiun awwal	جندي; Jundiun
