= Bader bin Saud bin Mohammed Al-Saud =

Saudi Arabian writer, researcher and officer

- بدر بن سعود بن محمد آل سعود

Deputy Commander of the Special Forces for Hajj and Umrah
- Incumbent
- Assumed office 2020

Assistant Commander for Special Force Security at the Grand Mosque

Personal details
- Born: Saudi Arabia
- Education: King Fahd Security College (BSc in Security Sciences, 1992); King Fahd Security College (Postgraduate Diploma in Police Sciences, 1995); University of Westminster (MA in International Journalism, 2005); Goldsmiths, University of London (PhD in Media and Communication, 2014); King Abdulaziz University (PhD in Information Sciences - Crowd Management, 2020)
- Alma mater: King Fahd Security College; University of Westminster; Goldsmiths, University of London; King Abdulaziz University
- Awards: King Faisal Medal

Military service
- Rank: Brigadier General
- Writing career
- Pen name: Bader bin Saud
- Genres: Opinion journalism, security studies
- Subjects: Security, culture, media, crowd management

Bader bin Saud bin Mohammed Al-Saud (Arabic: بدر بن سعود بن محمد آل سعود) is a Saudi Arabian writer, researcher, Assistant Professor, officer and university professor in crowd management and strategic planning.

He previously served as the Deputy Commander of the Special Forces for Hajj and Umrah, and as Assistant Commander for Special Force Security at Makkah's Grand Mosque. He is a regular contributor and columnist for Al-Riyadh, Arab News and Okaz newspapers, writing under the pen name Bader bin Saud. Bin Saud's third grandfather is Imam Saud bin Faisal of the Second Saudi State.

== Education ==
Bin Saud obtained a bachelor's degree in security sciences from King Fahd Security College in 1992 and completed a postgraduate diploma in police sciences from the same institution in 1995. He later earned a master's degree in international journalism from the University of Westminster in London in 2005, and a PhD in media and communication from Goldsmiths, University of London in 2014.

In 2020, he earned a second doctoral degree in information sciences specializing in crowd management from King Abdulaziz University.

== Career ==
=== Security and military service ===
After graduation, bin Saud worked as an officer, detective, and search officer with the Riyadh provincial police department before being posted to the Saudi General Intelligence agency to join its special operations section. He was then appointed Director of the Makkah Police Public Relations and Media Department before being appointed Director of the Internal Patrol Section of the Holy Mosque's Special Forces in Makkah.

He served as Assistant Commander for Special Force Security at Makkah's Grand Mosque, a position within the Ministry of Interior. He was then appointed as the Assistant Commander of the Special Forces for Security of the Grand Mosque and Supervisor of Field Operations.

In September 2020, bin Saud was appointed as Deputy Commander of the Special Forces for Hajj and Umrah security.

=== Writing and journalism ===
From 1992 to 2000, bin Saud worked as a part-time journalist for Al Jazeera. Bader bin Saud has been a regular contributor to the opinion pages of various Saudi national newspapers. He writes a weekly column for Saudi newspapers Al-Riyadh and Okaz.

==== Selected publications ====
Bin Saud has published several papers including:

- سعود, العقيد د. بدر بن سعود آل; القرني, د. عبد الرحمن بن عبيد (2019-03-08). "المعرفة الضمنية واستثمارها في تطوير إجراءات تأمين المنشآت الأمنية". Journal of Information Studies & Technology (JIS&T). 2019 (1). doi:10.5339/jist.2019.2. ISSN 2616-4930.
- al-Saud, Bader S. M (2009-11-01). "Friend or Foe? Saudi Arabia in the British Press post 9/11". Journal of Arab & Muslim Media Research. 2 (1). Intellect: 39–51. doi:10.1386/jammr.2.1and2.39/1. ISSN 1751-9411.
- Abdulla, Rasha A. (2007). The Internet in the Arab world: Egypt and beyond. New York: Peter Lang. ISBN 978-0-8204-8674-1.

== Personal life ==
Bin Saud is married to Princess Budour bint Abdulnasser bin Mansour Al-Sihli, the First Secretary in the Ministry of Foreign Affairs, and has nine children, Faisal, Khalid, Saud, Mohamed, Salman, Abdulaziz, Reem, and Aljohara.

== Recognitions ==
When bin Saud was a lieutenant, King Fahd bin Abdulaziz awarded him the King Faisal Medal.
