= Awad =

Awad or Aouad or Awwad (Arabic: عوض or at times عوّاد) is an Arabic given name and surname. People with the name include:

== Given name ==
of the origin عوّاد

- Awwad Eid Al-Aradi Al-Balawi, former Director General of Saudi Arabian Border Guards, Ministry of Interior, Kingdom of Saudi Arabia
- Awad Hamad al-Bandar (1945–2007), Iraqi chief judge under Saddam Hussein's presidency
- Awad Khleifat (born 1945), Jordanian politician

== Surname ==
of the origin عوض

- Gamal Awad, Egyptian squash player
- Jacqueline Cabaj Awad, Swedish tennis player
- Krayem Awad, Austrian painter, sculptor and poet
- Mira Awad, Israeli Arab musician
- Mohammed Awad (politician), Iraqi politician
- Mubarak Awad, Palestinian-American psychologist
- Nihad Awad, American activist
- Ramzi Aouad, Australian murderer
- Saad Awad, American mixed martial artist
- Samer Awad, Syrian footballer
- Sumaya Awad, Palestinian American writer and activist

of the origin عوّاد

- Ahmed El Aouad, French-Moroccan footballer
- Awwad Alawwad (born 1972), Saudi politician and government minister
- Juliet Awwad (born 1951), Jordanian actress and director of Armenian descent
- Mahmoud Awad, Lebanese politician and physician
- Mohamed El Amine Aouad, Algerian

Canadian

- Mona Awad (born 1978), novelist and short story writer

== Other uses ==
- A Word A Day, Anu Garg
