= Saher System =

Saher system is an automated traffic enforcement camera system covering major cities in the Kingdom of Saudi Arabia. The system uses digital cameras network technology connected to the National Information Center of the Ministry of Interior.

The technology used is a network of digital instantaneous speed measurement and multipurpose cameras connected to an electronic repository of car owners data. Upon checking for and finding violations of speed limits, seat belt laws, texting-while-driving, or other traffic laws, the system requests the vehicle owner's information from the database and then issues fines accordingly. Car owners are momentarily notified by text of the fine's type, date and amount.

== History ==
On Friday, April 9, 2010, the General Directorate of Public Security announced the Saher system in a statement published by the Saudi Press Agency, that “the Kingdom will witness, in the coming months, the introduction of advanced global technology, represented in the project of monitoring, controlling and managing traffic automatically named the Saher system". On Monday, April 19, 2010, the first phase of the system began in the capital, Riyadh. In a press conference, Prince Khaled Al-Faisal, Governor of Makkah Al-Mukarramah Region, announced the start of implementing the Saher system in Makkah and Jeddah in early August 2010.
