= Ibrahim al-Asiri =

Saudi Arabian Al-qaeda member (1982-2017)

- Born: April 18 or 19, 1982; Riyadh, Saudi Arabia
- Died: 2017 (aged 34–35); Yemen
- Cause of death: Drone strike
- Other names: Abu Saleh; Khalid Ibrahim Al Aseery; Khaled Ibrahim Ahmad Al-Sunbul Al-Assiri
- Citizenship: Saudi Arabia
- Known for: al-Qaeda in the Arabian Peninsula bomb-maker
- Relatives: Abdullah al-Asiri (younger brother)

Ibrahim Hassan Tali al-Asiri (Arabic: ابراهيم حسن طالي العسيري; April 18 or 19, 1982 – 2017) was a citizen of Saudi Arabia suspected of being chief bomb-maker of al-Qaeda in the Arabian Peninsula. He was reported to have been responsible for making the bombs used by his brother Abdullah al-Asiri in his suicide bombing, the 2009 Christmas Day bomb plot, the 2010 cargo plane bomb plot, and the May 8th 2012 Terror Plot.

== History ==
Little is known about al-Asiri's early life; he was born in 1982 into a religious and military family in Riyadh with four brothers and three sisters. Al-Asiri's father is a retired soldier. As of September 2009, he had two surviving brothers.

The Saudi Gazette reported that al-Asiri had been imprisoned and released. His imprisonment was a result of an attempt to enter Iraq to join Islamist insurgents. He reportedly left Saudi Arabia for Yemen together with his brother Abdullah al-Asiri — whom he had recruited to al-Qaeda — to join up with al-Qaeda members.

On February 3, 2009, al-Asiri and Abdullah were named on a list of Saudi Arabia's most wanted terrorist suspects. The list published by the Government of Saudi Arabia listed 85 individuals, 83 of whom were Saudis, and 2 were from Yemen.

On August 27, 2009, Abdullah blew himself up at the Jeddah palace of Saudi Arabia's Deputy Minister of the Interior prince Mohammed bin Nayef, in attempt to assassinate him after posing as a repentant militant. Abdullah, who had been recruited by Ibrahim as a suicide bomber, used a pentaerythritol tetranitrate (PETN) bomb that his brother had hidden in his rectum. Abdullah died in the attempt, but bin Nayef survived with minor injuries.

== Al-Qaeda in the Arabian Peninsula ==
Al-Asiri was suspected of being the main explosives expert for Al-Qaeda in the Arabian Peninsula (AQAP) and the bomb-maker responsible for building the bombs in the 2010 cargo plane bomb plot. He was a likely suspect due to his history of creating explosive devices using PETN, including his involvement in the failed Christmas Day bomb plot. Evidence suggested the same person constructed both the Yemen parcel bombs and the device worn by Umar Farouk Abdulmutallab, the Nigerian who attempted to ignite the Christmas Day bomb on a plane in 2009. One of the detonators was nearly identical to the one used in the Christmas Day attack.

In May 2012, American security officials leaked their acquisition of a document describing how to prepare and use liquid explosive implants (surgically implanted explosive devices). The implants would contain no metal parts, making them virtually undetectable by x-rays. Al-Asiri was reported to have been responsible for the development of the new weapon.

=== Sanctions ===
On 24 March 2011, al-Asiri was added to the U.S. list of terrorists. He was wanted by the government of Saudi Arabia and was the subject of an Interpol Orange Notice.

=== Reports of death ===
In September 2011, al-Asiri was reported to have possibly been killed by a drone strike together with other AQAP suspects, including American-Yemeni cleric Anwar al-Awlaki. A Yemeni official denied that al-Asiri was killed. On August 13, 2013, it was reported that Al-Asiri may have been seriously wounded by a drone strike which occurred on August 10. A Yemeni official denied that al-Asiri was wounded. Al-Asiri was thought to have possibly been killed in a fire fight on April 20, 2014. Yemeni troops recovered bodies to run DNA tests, but the tests were not a match.

Al-Asiri appeared in a 2016 video making references to Saudi Arabia's recent executions of al-Qaeda militants, thus confirming that he remained alive.

On August 20, 2018, United States officials announced they were confident that Al-Asiri had been killed by a drone strike in late 2017.

Writing in The Washington Post, Michael J. Morell, former deputy director of the Central Intelligence Agency, said that, if confirmed, "he would be the most significant international terrorist removed from the battlefield since Osama bin Laden."

=== Death confirmed ===
On 10 October 2019, U.S. President Donald Trump confirmed that al-Asiri was killed by a missile fired from an unmanned aerial vehicle in 2017.

== See also ==
Voice of America

- Nizar Rayan, who successfully recruited his own son for a suicide bombing mission
