= Ghezali =

Ghezali is a surname. Notable people with the name include:

- Lamine Ghezali (born 1999), French professional footballer
- Mehdi Ghezali (born 1979), Swedish citizen held in Guantanamo Bay detainment camp
- Mohammed Abdel Karim Al Ghezali, citizen of Yemen, one of the founders of Al-Qaeda in the Arabian Peninsula
- Rym Ghezali (1982–2021), Algerian actress and singer
- Salima Ghezali (born 1958), Algerian journalist and writer
