= General Directorate of Border Guard =

General Directorate of Border Guard المديرية العامة لحرس الحدود السعودية

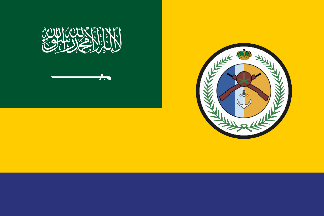

Agency overview
- Formed: 14 June 1913; 113 years ago (as Coast Guard Authority)
- Preceding agency: Coast Guard Authority
- Employees: 33,000 (2007)

Jurisdictional structure
- Operations jurisdiction: Saudi Arabia
- Specialist jurisdictions: National border patrol, security, integrity; Coastal patrol, marine border protection, marine search and rescue

Operational structure
- Headquarters: Ministry of Interior, Olaya, Riyadh, KSA.
- Elected officer responsible: Abdulaziz bin Saud, Minister of Interior

Website
- www.fg.gov.sa/en

The General Directorate of Saudi Borders Guard (Arabic: المديرية العامة لحرس الحدود السعودية) is a Saudi agency responsible for guarding land and sea borders of the Saudi Arabia. Awwad Eid Al-Aradi Al-Balawi is the General Director of Saudi Arabian Border Guards.

== History ==
The late King Abdulaziz Al Saud laid the foundation of the organs of the state. In 10/7/1331.H (14 June 1913) The late king was preoccupied and first concerned about the formation and setting up land and maritime patrols and surveillance centres in the Eastern region. The patrols and the centres were consisting of small sailing boats that sail along the coast supported by land patrols on camel’s back to watch the land.

In 1344 H, (c.1925) the core of the Coast Guard Authority was established in Jeddah and it was tasked with organizing the duties, roles and responsibilities of patrols, seaports and harbors. In 1347 H, (c.1928) the work of the patrols, seaports and harbors in Jeddah was unified under one leadership, which was "Coast Guard"; and its work was limited to the Red Sea coast. Coast Guard was entitled to carry out its duties on foot or on camels back, these patrols were tasked with inspecting wild land and seizing contraband items. The sea patrols were tasked with monitoring the coast within the territorial waters of the Kingdom by means of primitive boats. In 1353 H, (c.1934) the codes and regulations governing "The Coast Guard Authority” were issued, including all the provisions related to the roles, responsibilities and duties carried out by Coast Guard; under theses governing codes and regulations, the Coast Guard Authority was placed under the leadership of the Ministry of Interior.

In 1355 H, (c.1936) the Coast Guard Authority was established in the Eastern region. In 1382 H, (c.1963) the Frontier Forces were established and both Eastern and Jeddah Coast Guard authorities were integrated under the name of "the General Directorate of Frontier Forces, Ports and Coast Guard". A royal decree No. M / 26, dated 24/6/1394 H (15 July 1974) was issued approving the governing regulations of border security Code as per Cabinet Resolution No. 923, dated 19/6/1394 H the name was changed to be the "General Directorate of Frontier Forces". In 1399 H, the Minister of Interior passed a decision No. 2S/ 7074, dated 26/9/1399 H, (19 Aug 1979) by reassigning the duties and responsibilities carried out by Border Guard; to watch, control and protect all seaports in the Kingdom instead of the General Directorate of Public Security. The Minister of Interior passed decision No. 85/5/SH, dated 1/8/1412 H, (5 Feb 1992) amending the executive regulations governing Border Security code A royal decree No. M/9, dated 16/7/1414 H, (29 Dec 1993) was issued approving Cabinet Resolution No. 76, dated 14/7/1414 H (27 Dec 1993) amending the name of the "General Directorate Frontier Forces" to be "General Directorate of Border Guard".

== Regions ==
The GDBG is grouped into nine commands:

1. Border Guard Command in 'Asir Province
2. Border Guard Command in Eastern Province
3. Border Guard Command in al-Jawf Province
4. Border Guard Command in Jazan Province
5. Border Guard Command in Mecca Province
6. Border Guard Command in Medina Province
7. Border Guard Command in Najran Province
8. Border Guard Command in Northern Borders Province
9. Border Guard Command in Tabuk Province

== Ranks ==
Other ranks

Rank group	Senior NCOs				Junior NCOs	Enlisted
Saudi Arabian Border Guard							No insignia
Saudi Arabian Border Guard	رئيس رقباء; Rayiys ruqaba'	رقيب أول; Raqib 'awal	رقيب; Raqib	وكيل رقيب; Wakil raqib	عريف; Earif	جندي أول; Jundiun awwal	جندي; Jundiun
