= KNE =

KNE may refer to:

== Places ==
=== Train stations ===
- Kennett railway station (National Rail station code KNE), England, UK;
- Kishanganj railway station (Indian Railways station code KNE), Bihar, India

=== Aerodromes ===
- RAF Knettishall (abbreviated: KNE), Suffolk, England, UK; a WWII airfield
- Kanainj Airport (IATA airport code KNE), Kanainj, Papua New Guinea; see List of airports by IATA airport code: K

== People and characters ==
- Knuckles the Echidna, a character from the Sonic the Hedgehog series.
- Kne (character), a fictional character from the Japanese manga franchise Beelzebub; see List of Beelzebub characters

== Groups, companies, organizations ==
- Communist Youth of Greece (Greek: Κομμουνιστική Νεολαία Ελλαδας, romanized: Kommounistikí Neolaía Elladas; Greek: ΚΝΕ, romanized: KNE)
- Kone Corporation (Helsinki Stock Exchange symbol KNE)
- Khoi Nguyen Education Group (KNE), founder of the Canadian International School Vietnam
- Kompetenzzentrum Naturschutz und Energiewende (German: KNE)

=== Airlines ===
- Flynas (ICAO airline code KNE), a Saudi Arabian airline
- Kayala Airline (ICAO airline code KNE), a defunct Saudi Arabian airline

== Other uses ==
- Kankanaey language (ISO 639-3 code kne)
- Kilonovae (plural abbreviation: kNe, KNe)

== See also ==
- WKNE, callsign KNE in region W
- KKNE, callsign KNE in region K
