= Ministry of Interior building =

Government building in Riyadh, Saudi Arabia

- مبنى وزارة الداخلية
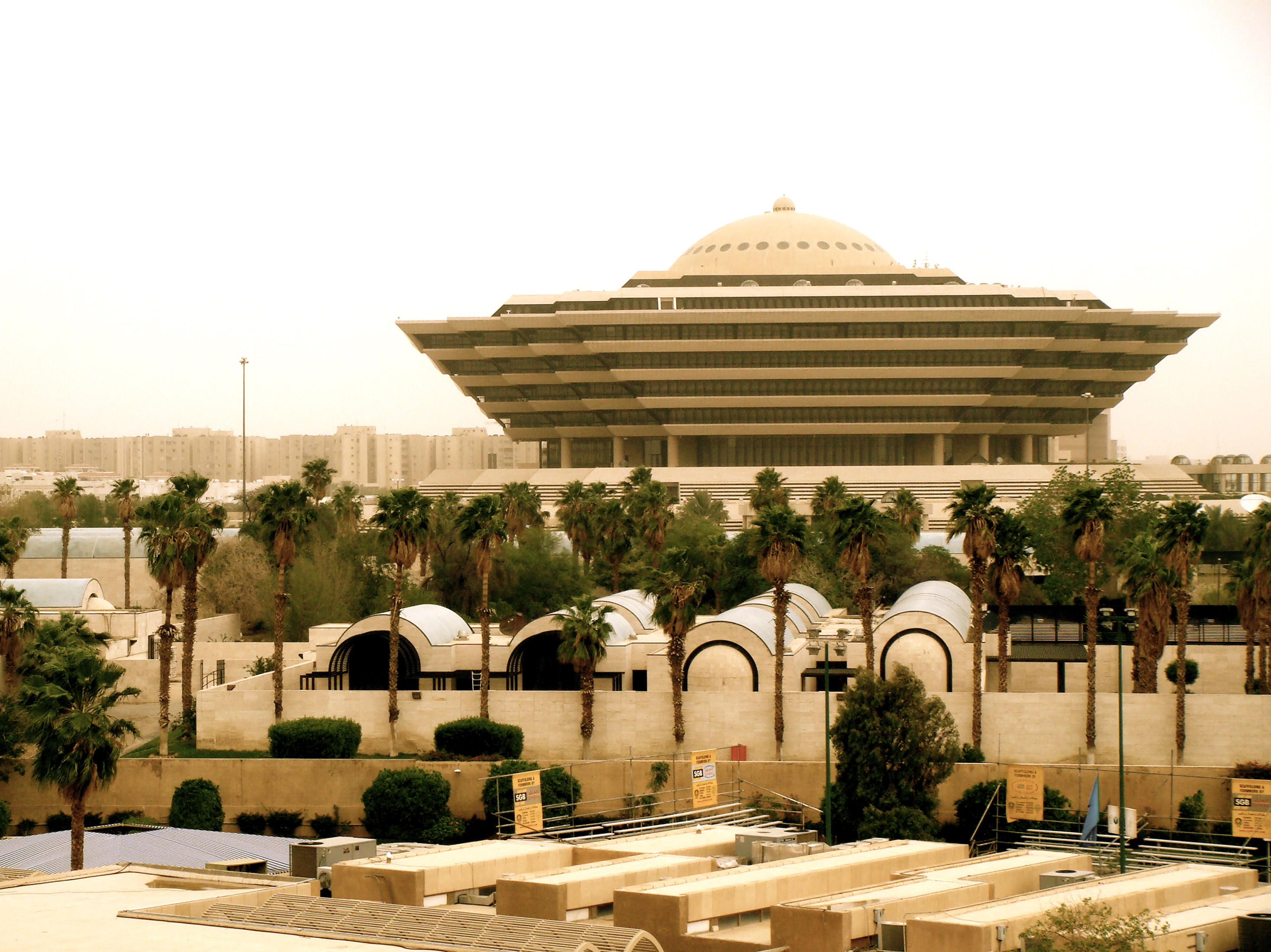
- The building in 2007
- Interactive map of the Ministry of Interior building area
- Alternative names: Spaceship; Flying Saucer

General information
- Type: Government building; Office building
- Location: Riyadh, Saudi Arabia
- Coordinates: 24.67058°N 46.69575°E
- Current tenants: Ministry of Interior
- Construction started: 1980
- Construction stopped: 1989
- Completed: 1992

Height
- Height: 55 m (180 ft)

Technical details
- Floor count: 6

Design and construction
- Architecture firm: Archisystems International
- Main contractor: Hyundai E&C

The Ministry of Interior building (Arabic: مبنى وزارة الداخلية) is a 55-meter high six-story government building in the al-Olaya district of Riyadh, Saudi Arabia, that houses the main headquarters of the country's Ministry of Interior. The building is a popular landmark in the city and is known for its inverted truncated square pyramid design surmounted by a dome, earning it nicknames like the Flying Saucer and the Spaceship by Western visitors. Designed by Archisystems and architects Musalli, Shakir and Mandill, it was constructed between 1980 and 1989 by Hyundai E&C.

== Overview ==
The exterior design of the building was completed in 1980 by a Canada-based firm. It was commissioned when Prince Nayef bin Abdulaziz was the country's interior minister.

In the May 1987 edition of the Gulf Construction magazine, it documented the progress of construction of the building. The magazine described the building under-construction in its "unclad skeletal state." Steelwork erection work started in December 1985. Major construction works were completed by 1989, and the ministry completely shifted its offices to the precincts in 1992.

The interior of the dome surmounted over the inverted truncated square-shaped pyramid was manufactured by Zahner in the period 1988–1990.

The building annually gets illuminated in green color, the color of the country's national flag, during the celebrations of public holidays like Saudi National Day and Saudi Founding Day.
