= Maha bint Mohammed Al Sudairi =

Saudi Arabian woman; wife of Nayef bin Abdulaziz Al Saud

- Spouse: Nayef bin Abdulaziz (div.)
- Children: 5
- Father: Mohammed bin Ahmad Al Sudairi

Maha bint Mohammed Al Sudairi (Arabic: مها بنت محمد السديري) is the former wife of Saudi Crown Prince Nayef bin Abdulaziz Al Saud.

== Personal life ==
Maha was a cousin and third wife of Nayef bin Abdulaziz Al Saud, with whom she has five children: Nouf, Nawwaf, Mishail, Hayfa and Fahd. One of her daughters, Nouf bint Nayef (born 1984), is the wife of Mohammad bin Abdullah, the son of Prince Nayef's half-brother and former King Abdullah. Maha's son Nawwaf was detained along with his older half-brother Mohammed bin Nayef and his uncle Ahmed bin Abdulaziz in early March 2020. In August 2020 although not announced officially some Twitter accounts reported that Prince Nawwaf had been released.

=== Controversy ===
Princess Maha acquired a luxurious property in Sweetwater Club Blvd., known as "Millionaires Row" in Sweetwater Club, Seminole County, Florida, for $2 million, and she spent another $4 million on improvements, including having a guesthouse and prayer chapel constructed. The house was fitted with an elaborate security system and an arsenal. She made news in 1995 when she became embroiled in a scandal for beating a servant who was suspected of stealing $200,000 in cash and jewellery from her. The servant would not press charges, but the princess abandoned her multimillion-dollar property with the windows open to the elements and never returned to the country.

In 2009, Princess Maha spent $20 million during an epic shopping spree in high-end Parisian boutiques, habitually walking out of the door after staff had been given an embossed card marked "Payment to Follow". She lived in various top hotels in Paris, including the Hôtel de Crillon, which remained a long-time creditor; she then moved to the luxury Four Seasons Hotel George V owned by Prince Nayef's nephew, Prince Al-Waleed bin Talal. Shops she patronised report that her payment history had always been excellent, but that her staff started shrugging off payment all of a sudden. She has since been pursued by some 30 Parisian retailers for 15 million euros worth of merchandise. Casualwear retailer Key Largo finally secured payment after obtaining a court order to seize goods from her Georges V hotel suite. Bailiffs were met by the Saudi consul, who issued a guaranteed payment for $125,000 in the presence of a chief of police. Those debts were said to have been eventually settled through the Saudi embassy. The negative publicity of her Parisian stay incurred the wrath of King Abdullah, who grounded her on her return from Paris. Nevertheless, she once again escaped back to Paris from Saudi Arabia in December 2011.

Media reported that Princess Maha and her entourage, occupying 41 rooms at the Shangri-La Hotel in the 16th Arrondissement in Paris where they had been staying since 23 December 2011, tried to sneak out of the hotel at 3:30 am of 31 May 2012 without paying the $7 million bill. Police were called, but Princess Maha claimed diplomatic immunity. In the meantime pending resolution, she decamped to the Royal Monceau Hotel owned by her friend Hamad bin Khalifa Al Thani, Emir of Qatar. In March 2013, creditors obtained a court order from a judge in Nanterre, and two storage units containing Princess Maha's purchases from 2012 were seized, to be auctioned off to satisfy creditors. Maha was barred from leaving Saudi Arabia after the latest spending spree.

In early 2018, Maha and her daughter Nouf were sued by an Eritrean nanny over allegations of, among other things, human trafficking and involuntary servitude, both in Saudi Arabia and in the US state of Virginia. However these claims were found to be false, and the lawsuit was dismissed with prejudice in August 2022.
