= Krayem =

Krayem is a surname. It may refer to:

- Omar Krayem (born 1988), American-Palestinian professional basketball player
- Osama Krayem (born 1992), also known as Naïm or Naim al Hamed, Swedish national of Syrian origin and a suspected terrorist
- Krayem Awad (born 1948), Vienna-based painter, sculptor and poet of Syrian origin
