= Body cavity bomb =

Explosive device hidden in a body cavity of a person or animal

A body cavity bomb (BCB) is an explosive device hidden inside the body of a person in order to commit a suicide attack. Although this is a common plot device in fiction, very few instances of this are known to have occurred in real life, with only one publicly documented case.

== 2009 attack on Prince Muhammad bin Nayef ==
In August 2009, Abdullah al-Asiri, the younger brother of Ibrahim al-Asiri (chief bomb-maker for Al Qaeda in the Arabian Peninsula), tried to assassinate a Saudi prince, Muhammad bin Nayef, with an improvised explosive device that had been inserted into his rectum and anal canal.

On 27 August 2009, Asiri queued up at Mohammed bin Nayef's palace in Jeddah as a "well-wisher," a tradition in the kingdom during Ramadan. He exploded the device (perhaps with a mobile phone), killing himself, but only lightly injuring bin Nayef (who was protected from the full force of the blast by Asiri's body). Assisted by his older brother, Ibrahim al-Asiri, he had hidden a pound (about 0.45 kg) of PETN plastic explosives in his rectum and anal canal, which security experts described as a novel technique. Asiri had passed through a metal detector and remained in the security of the Prince's bodyguards for over 24 hours before gaining the audience. "I did not want him to be searched, but he surprised me by blowing himself up," said Mohammed bin Nayef. The Saudi Gazette reported on October 22, 2009, that a Yemeni named Rayed Abdullah Salem Al Harbi assisted Asiri in preparing for his suicide mission.

According to the American defense official Michael G. Vickers, a laparoscopic surgeon had helped Abdullah's brother Ibrahim al-Asiri implant explosives inside suicide bombers. This surgeon was killed in 2012.

== Media speculation ==
In May 2012, various reporters leaked their acquisition of documents describing the preparation and use of such devices. According to The Daily Mirror in the UK, security officials at the British Secret Intelligence Service asserted that female bombers could travel undetected carrying binary explosive chemicals inside otherwise standard breast implants. The bomber would blow up the implanted explosives by injecting a chemical trigger.

== Analysis ==
Tactically speaking, the use and employment of the BCB falls into a category of tactics known as ‘in-situ’ attacks. Several factors play into the (theoretical) effectiveness and (practical) deployability of BCBs:

- Because their blast yield has been shown to range from low to negligible, BCBs are suitable only for closed-in attacks, i.e. the attacker carrying the device has to be in direct contact with the target while detonating it), and
- Like other explosive devices, BCBs have higher effectiveness when used indoors due to blast reflection and pressure wave confinement. Use in a less confined space (such as any open or outdoor environment) would (potentially severely) diminish damage potential.

== Detection ==
Body cavity bombs are hard to detect by most non-invasive means. However, attempts have been made to create methods for detecting them using various physical principles, including nuclear quadrupole resonance.

== In fiction ==
The BCB has a long history in science fiction writing and film history. For example, in the 1957 novella "Run for the Stars" by Harlan Ellison, the drug-addicted protagonist has a bomb implanted in his abdomen to delay an advancing alien army, making him an involuntary suicide bomber. Notwithstanding, in conventional security thinking, it has been noted that "placing bombs inside live human beings was still definitely not on the radar" prior to 2009.

The concept of the BCB has been regularly used as a theatrical–plot device in many popular TV shows and movies since at least the late 1960s (and perhaps earlier), and a number of popular U.S. films and television series episodes have featured the BCB, "ironically illustrating many of the key tactical concepts herein—that is, it is hidden in the human body, camouflaged from intelligence sensors, and used for attacks on specific targets". For example:

- The U.S. film, Death Race 2000, a 1975 cult action film, in which one of the characters called ‘Frankenstein’ intends to assassinate the president by planning to shake his hand, detonating a grenade which has been implanted in the perpetrator's prosthetic right hand (who calls it his ‘hand grenade’).
- The 1990 Star Trek: The Next Generation episode ‘Reunion’ features an attempted assassination using a BCB hidden and undetected (from security sensors) inside a person's arm, requiring them to stand close to their intended target.
- In 1999's Star Wars: Episode I The Phantom Menace it is mentioned slaves on Tatooine are implanted with tracking devices that explode and kill the victim if they venture too far. A young Anakin Skywalker mentions trying to locate his and remove it prior to being freed by Qui Gon Jinn.
- The 2001 U.S. science fiction movie Impostor, based on the 1953 short story Impostor by Philip K. Dick, features the use of BCBs. Set in the year 2079, the film's plot revolves around human 'replicants', created by hostile aliens, which are perfect biological copies of existing humans, complete with transplanted memories. This allows the 'replicants' to approach their targets camouflaged from detection. Each has a small, organic nuclear bomb in place of a heart, programmed to detonate when they are in proximity to their target.
- The British television series Spooks features in its season 3 finale a woman carrying a chemical BCB in an attempt to murder the prime minister, the bomb contained in her stomach to avoid discovery.
- The 2008 Batman film, The Dark Knight, also featured a BCB. In that film, a fictional scenario was portrayed where the Joker blew up a police station by means of a cell-phone activated bomb sewn into an unwilling victim's stomach.
- The novel Eve of Destruction by Sylvia Day features several female protagonists who have been implanted with BCB devices.
- The 2009 war film The Hurt Locker features a BCB when the body of a young Iraqi boy is found to have been surgically implanted with an unexploded bomb.
- The 2015 video game Metal Gear Solid V: Ground Zeroes features two BCBs inside Paz, implanted by Skull Face as a set-up. One bomb is successfully removed, but the other explodes, killing Paz, destroying the helicopter that they were on and wounding Big Boss severely in the process.
- In season one of the 2015 Israeli television series, Fauda, an operative of the Israel Defense Forces is kidnapped by Hamas and killed with a BCB.
- In the season 28 finale of Indian TV serial Diya Aur Baati Hum, IPS Sandhya and her husband Sooraj are forced to eat capsule bombs. In order to save the city from the blast they both drown themselves in a river.
- In the book series, “The Unwind Dystology” by Neal Shusterman, Clappers are young terrorists that have introduced an undetectable chemical into their circulatory system that makes their blood explosive. They get their name because they detonate by bringing their hands together in powerful applause.

== See also ==
- Improvised explosive device
