= Awwad =

Awwad (in Arabic عوّاد, In English can be written as Awad)is an Arabic name or surname. People with the name include:

== Given name ==
- Awwad Al-Sharafat (born 25 December 1993) is a Jordanian middle-distance runner

== Surname ==
- Ali Abu Awwad (born 1972), Palestinian activist and pacifist
- Arabi Awwad (1928–2015), kunya Abu Fahd, Palestinian communist politician
- Mohammed al-Awwad (died 2012), Syrian brigadier general
- Tawfiq Yusuf 'Awwad (1911–1989), Lebanese writer and diplomat
- Tayseer Qala Awwad (born 1943), Syrian politician and minister

== See also ==
- Awad (and Aouad)
