= Nawwaf bin Nayef Al Saud =

Saudi Arabian prince and businessman (born 1988)

- Born: 1988 (age 37–38)
- Spouse: Al Anoud bint Sultan Al Saud
Names
- Nawwaf bin Nayef bin Abdulaziz Al Saud
- House: Al Saud
- Father: Nayef bin Abdulaziz
- Mother: Maha bint Mohammed Al Sudairi

Nawwaf bin Nayef Al Saud (born 1988) is a member of the Saudi ruling family, one of the grandsons of Saudi Arabia's founder King Abdulaziz, and a businessman. He was detained in March 2020 together with other senior royals, including Mohammed bin Nayef and Ahmed bin Abdulaziz. Nawwaf was released in August 2020.

== Biography ==
Prince Nawwaf was born in 1988. He is one of five children of former Crown Prince Nayef bin Abdulaziz and Maha bint Mohammed Al Sudairi. His parents divorced. His full siblings are Nouf, Mishail, Hayfa and Fahd.

As of 2014, Nawwaf bin Nayef served as an administrative attaché at the Embassy of Saudi Arabia in the United States. He is married to Al Anoud bint Sultan, daughter of Prince Sultan bin Abdulaziz.

== Arrest ==
Nawwaf bin Nayef was arrested in March 2020 along with his elder brother, the former Crown Prince Mohammed bin Nayef, who had been dismissed from his governmental positions in 2017. They were detained together in a desert camp. In the same incident their uncle and King Salman's full-brother Ahmed bin Abdulaziz was also arrested. David D. Kirkpatrick and Ben Hubbard of The New York Times argue that this move was to eliminate the potential threats to the newly installed Crown Prince Mohammed bin Salman. In August 2020 some Twitter accounts and his lawyers reported that Prince Nawwaf had been released, but they also added that it was not clear where he was.
