= SNAS Aviation =

Saudi Cargo Airline

| IATA | ICAO | Call sign |
|---|---|---|
| - | RSE | RED SEA |
- Founded: 1979
- Ceased operations: April 24, 2014
- Hubs: King Khalid International Airport
- Fleet size: 5
- Parent company: DHL
- Headquarters: Riyadh, Saudi Arabia
- Key people: Saud bin Nayef Al Saud (Owner)

SNAS Aviation (legally Saudi National Air Services Limited) was a cargo airline based in Riyadh, Saudi Arabia and operated exclusive flights for DHL International Aviation ME.

== History ==
SNAS Aviation was established in 1979 operating scheduled services between Muharraq and Riyadh, and after the 1990s its services were expanded. The owner of SNAS was Prince Saud bin Nayef Al Saud.

== Fleet ==
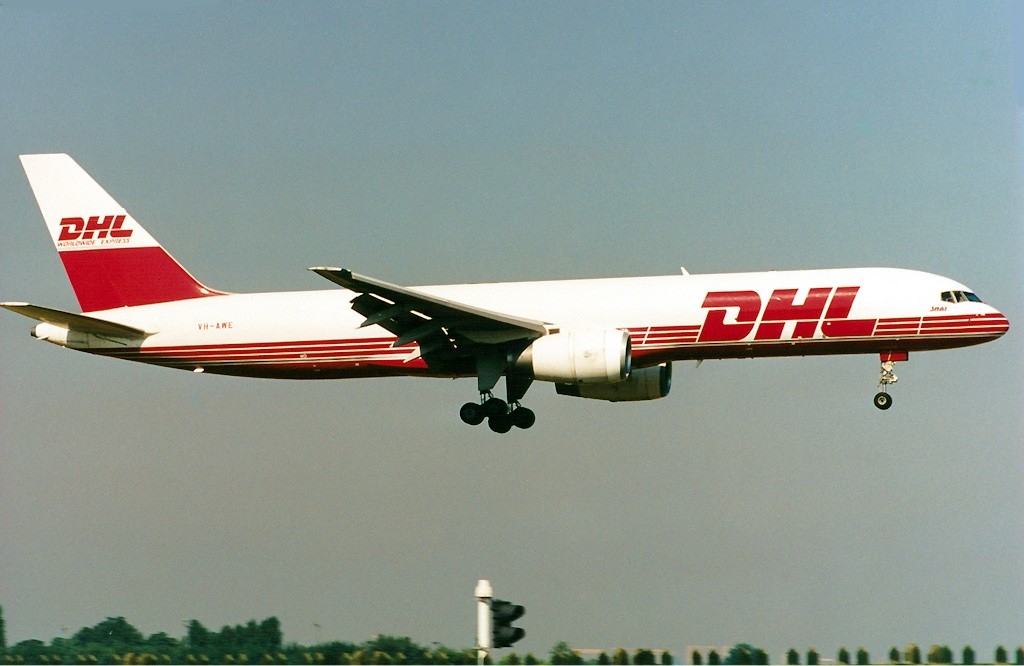
A former SNAS Aviation Boeing 757-200PF landing at Brussels Airport in 1996. This aircraft was destroyed in the 2002 Überlingen mid-air collision.

The SNAS Aviation fleet included the following aircraft (as of February 2010):

- 5 Boeing 727-200F

The airline previously operated the following aircraft:

- 2 Boeing 757-200PF
- 2 Convair CV-580
- 7 Fairchild Metro III

== See also ==
- List of defunct airlines of Saudi Arabia
