= Saud bin Nayef Al Saud =

Saudi royal, businessman and government official (born 1956)

Governor of Eastern Province
- In office: 14 January 2013 – present
- Predecessor: Mohammed bin Fahd
- Monarch: Abdullah; Salman

Head of the Crown Prince Court
- In office: November 2011 – 14 January 2013
- Predecessor: Ali bin Ibrahim Al Hadeethi
- Successor: Mohammed bin Salman Al Saud
- Monarch: Abdullah

Saudi Arabia Ambassador to Spain
- In office: 10 September 2003 – July 2011
- Predecessor: Abdulaziz Al Thunayan
- Successor: Mansour bin Khaled bin Abdullah Al Farhan
- Monarch: Fahd; Abdullah
- Born: 1956 (age 69–70)
- Spouse: Princess Abeer bint Faisal bin Turki
- Issue: List: Princess Jawahir; Prince Abdulaziz; Prince Mohammed; Princess Nora; Princess Sara
- House: Al Saud
- Father: Nayef bin Abdulaziz Al Saud
- Mother: Al Jawhara bint Abdulaziz bin Musaid Al Jiluwi
- Education: University of Portland

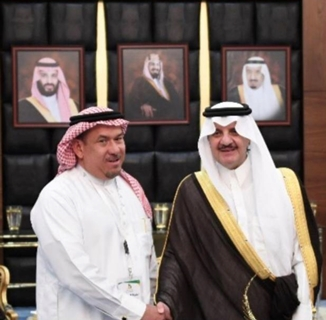
Prince Saud Bin Naif with swimmer Jassim Algareeb

Saud bin Nayef Al Saud (Arabic: سعود بن نايف بن عبد العزيز آل سعود; born 1956) is a Saudi Arabian politician who has served as governor of Eastern Province since 13 January 2013. A member of the House of Saud and a grandson of Saudi's founder King Abdulaziz, he is the former head of the Crown Prince Court and special advisor to the Saudi Crown Prince. Prince Saud was once regarded as one of the candidates for king or crown prince when succession passed to the new generation. However, on the death of King Abdullah in 2015, he was passed over in the line of succession in favor of his younger brother Mohammed bin Nayef.

== Early life and education ==
Prince Saud was born in 1956. He is the eldest son and one of ten children of the former Crown Prince of Saudi Arabia, Nayef bin Abdulaziz. His mother is Al Jawhara bint Abdulaziz bin Musaid Al Jiluwi who died in July 2019. She was a member of the powerful Jiluwi clan whose members have been intermarried with those of House of Saud, and sister of King Fahd's wife. Prince Mohammed is his younger brother.

Saud bin Nayef received a bachelor of arts degree in economics and management from the University of Portland.

== Career and activities ==
Saud bin Nayef was appointed vice president of the youth welfare presidency in January 1986. However, he resigned after six months. Then he had business dealings. In February 1993, he began to serve as the deputy governor of the Eastern Province and left business activities. His term lasted until 2003. Shortly after, he was appointed Saudi ambassador to Spain on 10 September 2003 and served in the post until July 2011. While serving as ambassador, he contributed to the organization of interfaith conference in Madrid that brought together Israeli and American rabbis and Wahhabi clerics in July 2008. The conference was an initiative of King Abdullah.

Next, Prince Saud was appointed assistant minister of interior for public affairs and advisor to Second Deputy Prime Minister and his father Prince Nayef in July 2011.

Saud bin Nayef was the head of the Crown Prince Court and special advisor to the Crown Prince at the rank of minister from November 2011 to 13 January 2013. He replaced Ali bin Ibrahim Al Hadeethi as head of the court. During his tenure, Prince Saud exercised the power given him through this appointment on behalf of his father rather than on his own authority. His term as the head of the court and special advisor to the Crown Prince continued after Prince Nayef's death in June 2012 for six months.

On 13 January 2013, Prince Saud was appointed governor of the oil-rich Eastern province at the rank of minister, replacing Mohammed bin Fahd in the post.

== Other roles and business activities ==
During his term as Saudi Ambassador to Spain, Prince Saud had contacts with president of the Madrid Stock Exchange. He was one of the members of the board of trustees of the Arab Thought Foundation that is a Saudi think-tank group, attempting to improve the relations between Arab nations and the Western nations.

Saud bin Nayef is deputy chairman of the Higher Commission of the Prize of Prince Nayef bin Abdulaziz Al Saud for the Prophetic Sunnah and Islamic Studies and General Supervisor of the Prize.

In addition to these semi-public roles, in December 2011, Saud bin Nayef was appointed member of the Allegiance Council since his father could not have a seat in the Council due to being then crown prince.

Saud bin Nayef has also some business activities. He has a stake in Danagas corporation and is the owner of SNAS trading and contracting company. In the 1990s he was the chairman of an engineering company based in Riyadh which was established in 1979.

== Personal life ==
Saud bin Nayef was married twice. His first wife is Abeer bint Faisal bin Turki, daughter of his aunt Luluwah bint Abdulaziz. They have four children: Jawahir, Abdulaziz, Mohammed and Noura. He had another daughter, Sara, with his second wife, but the child died in infancy. His son, Mohammed, married a daughter of Sultan bin Abdulaziz. One of Prince Saud's daughters married Faisal bin Saud, son of Saud bin Abdullah Al Saud in October 2010 and the other married Nayef bin Sultan bin Abdulaziz on 10 December 2010.

His son, Mohammed bin Saud, has Al Naifat stable. He won the Belgium International championship and World Horse Producers Cup in the US in April 2012. He also won the Di Pietrasanta international B show in May 2012. Two horses from the Al Naifat stable, Diana and Mascot, were chosen as the most beautiful horses among more than 100 Arab origin horses in the same event.

== Views ==
Concerning the business activities of the Al Saud family, Saud bin Nayef argued "You have to understand one simple fact. Since it (Al Saud Family) is a big family and we cannot all have government jobs, some have to make a living. That's only fair."

Political offices
Preceded by Mohammed bin Fahd	Governor of East Province; 2013 – present	Succeeded by Incumbent
