= Al Wafeer Air =

IATA	ICAO	Call sign
-	WFR	WAFEER
- Founded: 2009
- Ceased operations: 2011
- Hubs: King Abdul Aziz International Airport
- Fleet size: 3
- Headquarters: Jeddah, Saudi Arabia
- Key people: Adnan Dabbagh (CEO)

Al Wafeer Air (Arabic: الوفير للطيران) was a charter airline based in Jeddah, Saudi Arabia. Its main operations were Hajj and Umrah charters. Al Wafeer ended operations in 2011.

== History ==
Al Wafeer Air was founded by Adnan Dabbagh, former Executive Vice-President of Operations of Saudia. The major stakeholders in the carrier were Saudia which held a (40%) stake in the carrier, with Bin Laden Group, the Naghi Group and Al Tayyar Travel Group holding (12.75%).

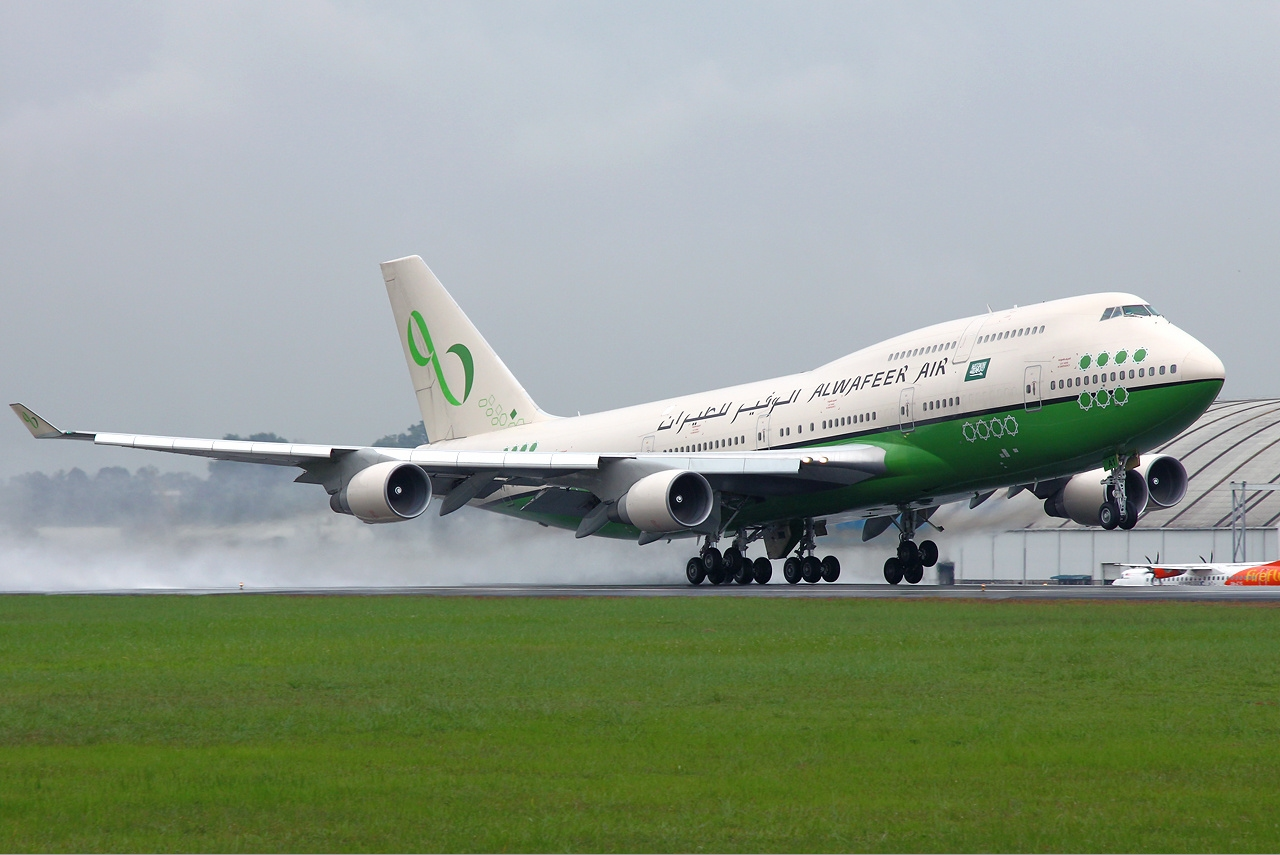
Al Wafeer Air Boeing 747-400.

They had operated one Airbus A310-300 leased from White Airways and three Boeing 747-400 leased from Malaysia Airlines.

== Controversy ==
In February 2011, a Malaysian daily reported that cabin crews working with Al Wafeer were only paid half of their salaries and also their allowances' payment had been put on hold. However, the issue was solved when Al Wafeer agreed to pay the outstanding dues.The company owed hundreds of thousands of US Dollars to employees after giving them written guarantees that the dues will be settled in early 2011. Many foreign pilots departed without fully understanding the rules of the labour courts in KSA and as KSA does not permit any visitors to enter the country, the pilots were not able to pursue their claims in the labour court. Salah Bin Laden refused to pay, pleading poverty and lack of cash.

== See also ==
- List of defunct airlines of Saudi Arabia
