= General Directorate of the Mujahideen =

The General Directorate of the Mujahideen (Arabic: الإدارة العامة للمجاهدين) is one of the departments of the Saudi Ministry of Interior. The directorate is headquartered in Riyadh, with regional branches located in Makkah, the Eastern Province, Asir, Najran, Jazan, Tabuk, the Northern Border Region, Medina, and Al-Qassim.

== History ==
The General Directorate of the Mujahideen was formed from the military units that had supported King Abdulaziz in unifying Saudi Arabia. By 1930, these units were administered by the Diwan al-Jihad, which was part of the Royal Court. Following the dissolution of the Hajjana forces in 1935, some of their units were reorganised into Mujahideen brigades under the office's supervision. In 1963, the office transferred to the Ministry of the Interior and became the General Directorate of the Mujahideen.

In September 2024, officers from the directorate arrested individuals suspected of drug trafficking in Asir and Jeddah.

In September 2026, directorate patrols in Jazan detained a man for transporting six Ethiopian nationals in violation of border security regulations.

During the 2026 Hajj season, the directorate urged compliance with the regulations governing entry to Mecca.

== Responsibilities ==
The department is currently carrying out many security tasks such as private guard participation, guarding water sources, oil lines, combating begging, combating the sales of illegal drugs, maintaining public stability, participating in the service of pilgrims, and other large and modernizing actions it carries out.
