= Abdulaziz bin Saud Al Saud =

Saudi royal and Minister of Interior (born 1983)

His Royal Highness Abdulaziz bin Saud Al Saud
- عبد العزيز بن سعود آل سعود
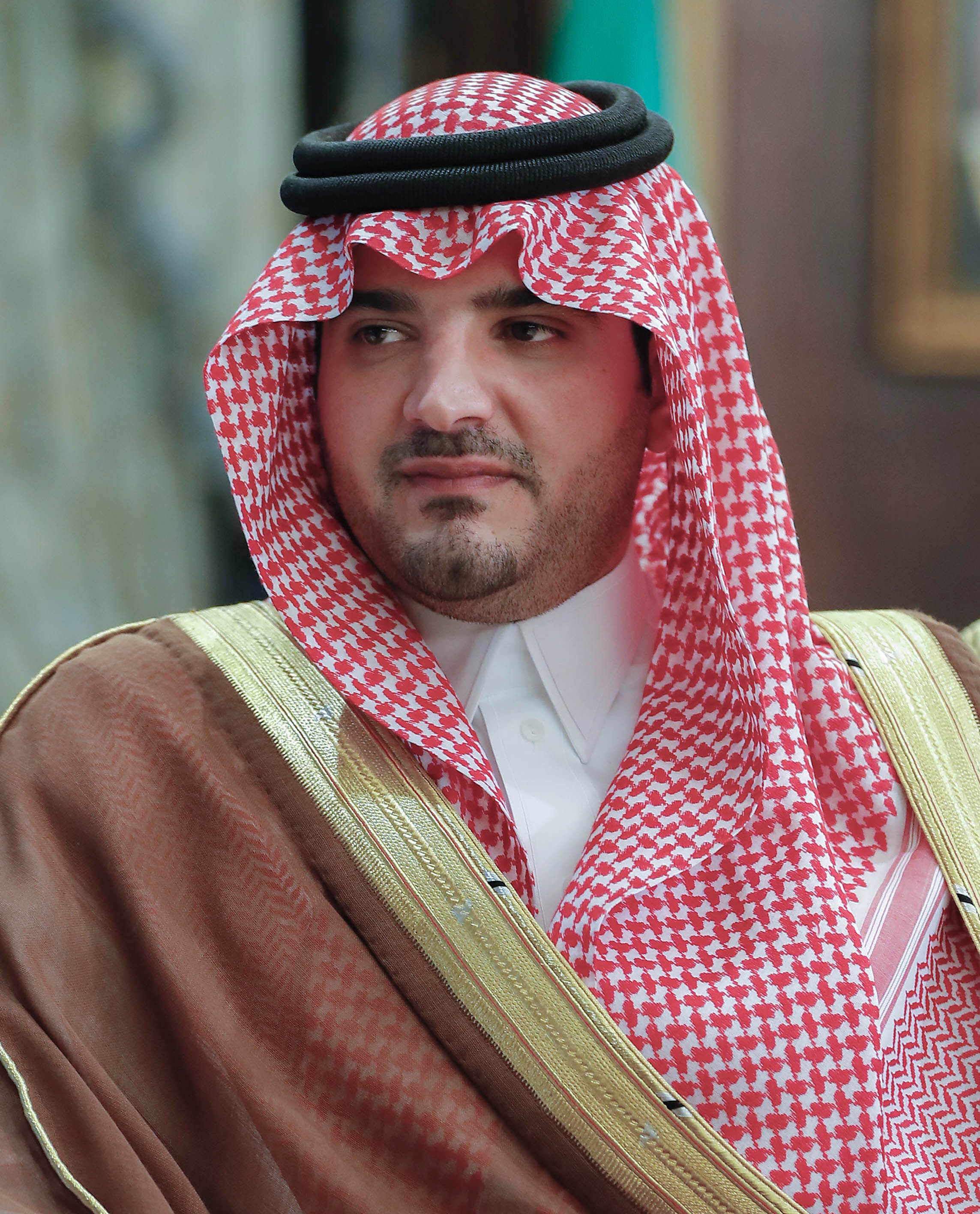
- Abdulaziz in 2018

Minister of Interior
- Incumbent
- Assumed office 21 June 2017
- Monarch: Salman
- Prime Minister: Salman (2017–2022); Mohammed bin Salman (2022–present)
- Preceded by: Muhammad bin Nayef

Personal details
- Born: 4 November 1983 (age 42) Riyadh, Saudi Arabia
- Children: Prince Nayef; Prince Ahmed; Prince Saud; Prince Mohammed
- Names: Abdulaziz bin Saud bin Nayef bin Abdulaziz
- Parents: Prince Saud bin Nayef (father); Princess Abeer bint Faisal bin Turki (mother)
- Education: King Saud University
- House: Al Saud

Abdulaziz bin Saud bin Nayef bin Abdulaziz Al Saud (Arabic: عبد العزيز بن سعود آل سعود ʿAbd al ʿAzīz ibn Suʿūd Āl Suʿūd; born 4 November 1983) is a Saudi royal who has been the Minister of Interior of Saudi Arabia since 21 June 2017. The position was previously held by his uncle, former Crown Prince Muhammad bin Nayef, whereas his grandfather former Prince Nayef held the position for multiple decades.

== Early life and education ==
Abdulaziz bin Saud is the eldest son of Saud bin Nayef, who is the eldest son of the former Crown Prince Nayef bin Abdulaziz. His mother is Abeer bint Faisal bin Turki.

He is a graduate of the Dhahran Ahliyyah School and King Saud University.

== Career ==
After King Salman came to power in January 2015, Abdulaziz was appointed as an adviser to the Royal Court in various departments, and later served as an adviser at the defense ministry. On 21 June 2017 he was named the Interior Minister.
