= Mohammed Abdel Karim Al Ghezali =

Member of al-Qaeda

- Mohammed Al Ghezali and Said Ali al-Shihri appear in an al-Qaeda fundraising video.
- Other names: Mohammed al Ghazali; Muhammad al Ghazali; Muhammad Abd al-Karim al-Ghazali; Mohammed Abdul Hakeem Al-Ghazali; Abu Hisham Mawari; Abu Hisham al-Mawari; Abu Sa'id; Abu Faris; Rashid
- Known for: One of the leaders of Al-Qaeda in the Arabian Peninsula

Mohammed Abdel Karim Al Ghezali is a citizen of Yemen who was one of the founders of Al-Qaeda in the Arabian Peninsula in 2009 and remains one of its senior leaders. CBS News reported that Al Ghezali appeared in a September 2009 fundraising video with Said Ali al-Shihri, the second in command of Al-Qaeda in the Arabian Peninsula.

The Saudi Gazette reports that Al Ghezali "assisted in the movements of Abdullah al-Asiri, the author of the [sic] August's failed assassination attempt on Prince Muhammad bin Nayef."

On January 4, 2018, US counterintelligence officials placed Al Ghezali and two other individuals on its list of specially designated terrorists. The US State Department described Al Ghezali, Wanas al-Faqih, and Abukar Ali Adnan as senior leaders of three different offshoots of al-Qaeda. Abukar Ali Adnan was the deputy leader of Al Shabaab. Wanas al-Faqih was a leader of al-Qaeda in the Islamic Maghreb.
