= List of defunct airlines of Saudi Arabia =

This is a list of defunct airlines of Saudi Arabia.

Airline	Image	IATA	ICAO	Callsign	Founded	Ceased operations	Notes
Al Khayala		XY	KNE		2005	2008	Rebranded as Kayala Airline
Al Wafeer Air		AW	WFR	WAFEER	2009	2011	
ASACO							Never launched
Kayala Airline		XY	KNE		2008	2009	
Nas Air		XY	KNE		2007	2013	Rebranded as Flynas
Sama		ZS	SMY	NAJIM	2007	2010	
SaudiGulf		6S	SGQ	SAUDIGULF	2016	2020	
SNAS Aviation			RSE	RED SEA	1979	2014	

== See also ==
- List of airlines of Saudi Arabia
- List of airports in Saudi Arabia
