= General Directorate of Public Security =

General Directorate of Public Security مديرية الأمن العام
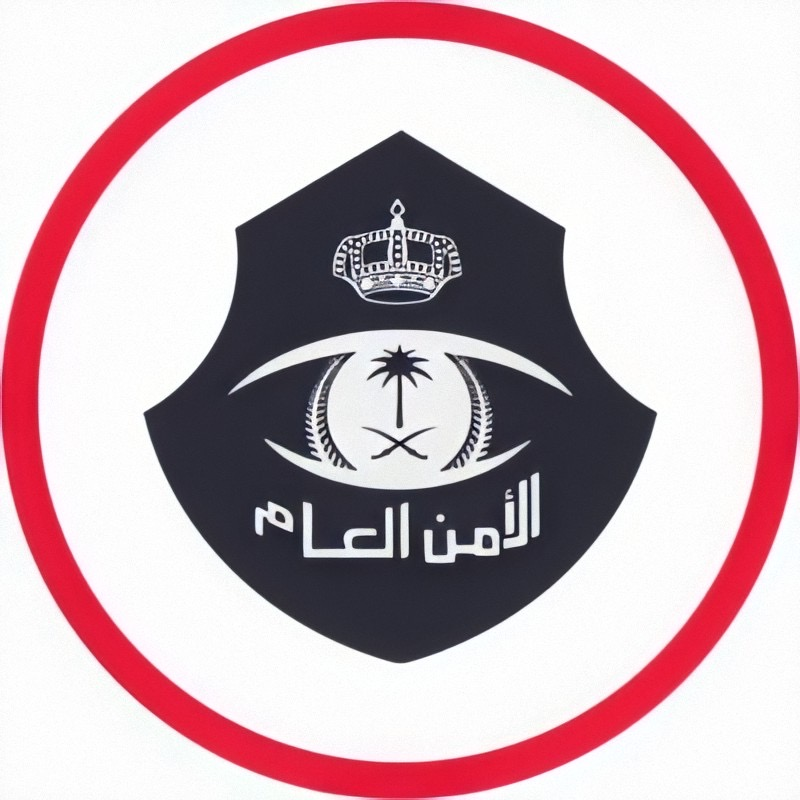

Agency overview
- Formed: 1927; 99 years ago
- Preceding agency: General Directorate of Police

Jurisdictional structure
- Operations jurisdiction: Saudi Arabia
- General nature: Civilian police

Operational structure
- Agency executive: Mohammed bin Abdullah Al-Bassami
- Parent agency: Ministry of Interior

General Directorate of Public Security (Arabic: مديرية الأمن العام), formerly General Directorate of Police (Arabic: مديرية عامة للشرطة), are the civilian police force under the Ministry of Interior responsible for law enforcement in Saudi Arabia.

== Sections ==
- Special Tasks and Duties Task Force
- Traffic Police Department
- Police Department
- Weapons and Explosives Department
- Search and Investigations Department
- Forensics Department
- Community Security and Anti-Human Trafficking Department

== Leadership ==
- Hassan Faqi Bey (1926-1926)
- Abdul Aziz bin Saleh Al-Baghdadi (1927-1928)
- Murad Al-Ikhtiyar (1928-1928)
- Mahdi bin Qadri bin Saleh Qalaji (1928-1946)
- Ali Jameel (1946-1952)
- Talat Wafa (1952-1956)
- Ghalib Tawfiq (1956-1958)
- Sulaiman bin Hamad Al Jared (1958-1960)
- Ahmed Mustafa Yaghmour (1960-1966)
- Mohamed Eltayeb Eltounsi (1966-1975)
- Fayez Mohammed Al-Aoufi (1975-1980)
- Abdullah bin Abdul Rahman Al Sheikh (1980-1991)
- Ahmed Mohammed Bilal (1991-1998)
- Asaad bin Abdul Karim Al-Furaih (1998-2003)
- Saeed bin Abdullah Al-Qahtani (2003-2014)
- Othman bin Nasser Al-Muhrej (2014-2017)
- Saud Abdulaziz Al Hilal (2017-2019)
- Khaled bin Qarar Al Harbi (2019-2022)
- Saeed bin Abdullah Al-Qahtani (2022-2022)
- Mohammed bin Abdullah Al-Bassami (2022-Present)

== Special Forces ==
There are forces report to the General Directorate of Public Security. These are as follows:

- Roads security special forces
- Diplomatic security special forces
- Hajj and Umrah special forces

== Ranks ==
Officers

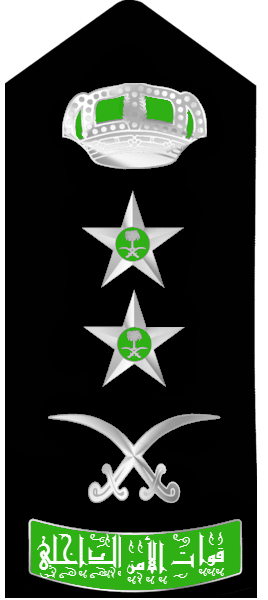
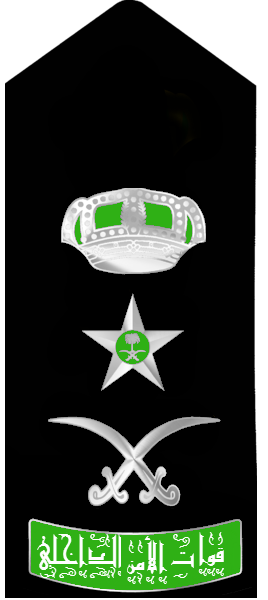
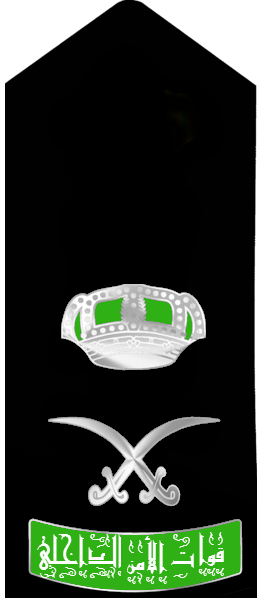
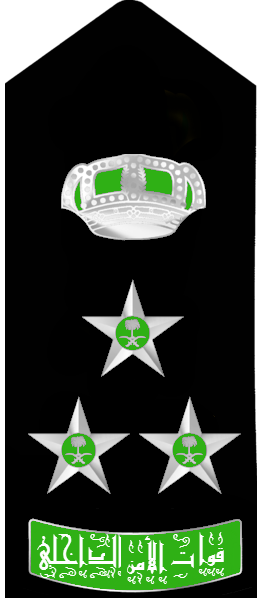
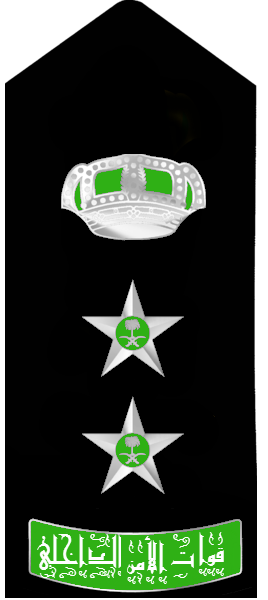
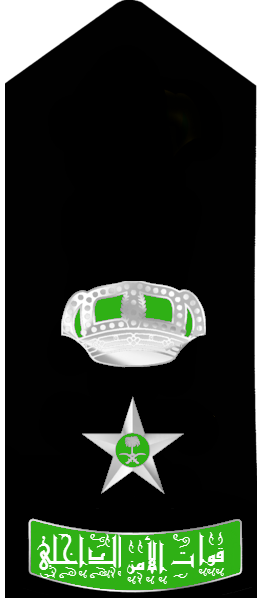
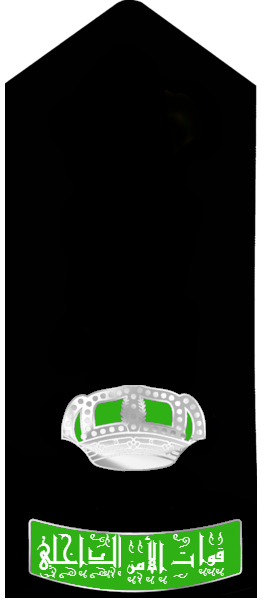
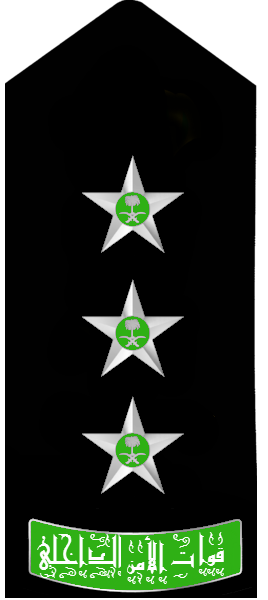
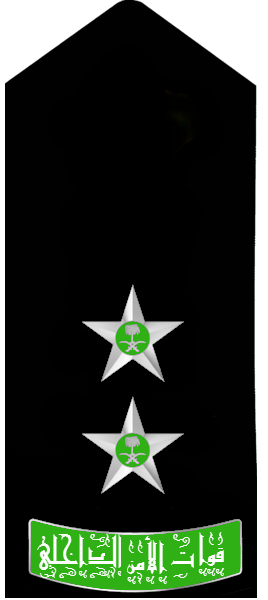
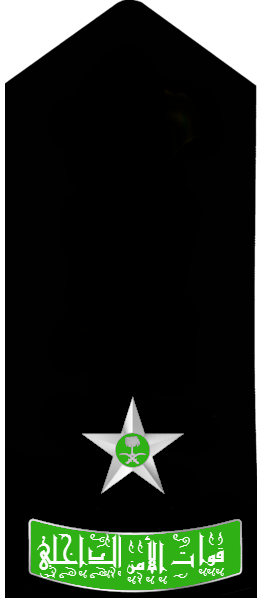
Rank group	General / flag officers				Senior officers			Junior officers
(Saudi Arabia) General Directorate of Public Security
(Saudi Arabia) General Directorate of Public Security	فريق أول; Fariq 'awal	فريق; Fariq	لواء; Liwa	عميد; Amid	عقيد; Aqid	مقدم; Muqaddam	رائد; Ra'id	نقيب; Naqib	ملازم أول; Mulazim awwal	ملازم; Mulazim

Enlisted

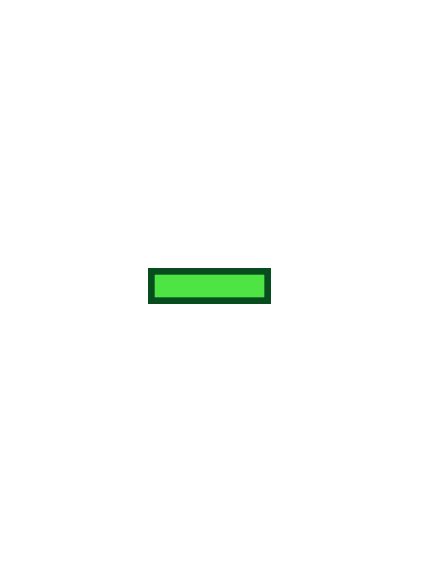
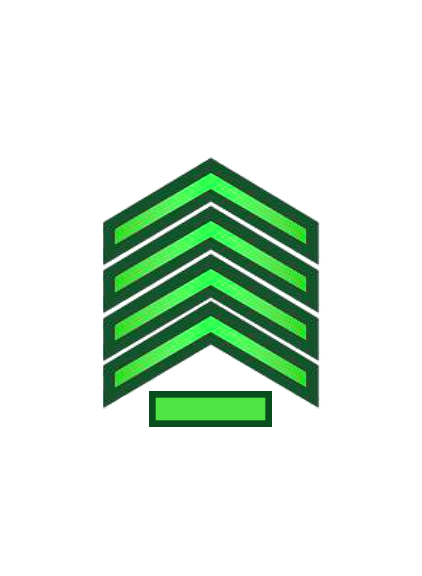
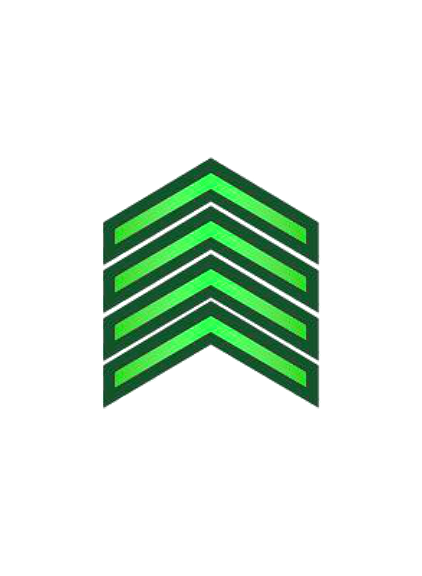
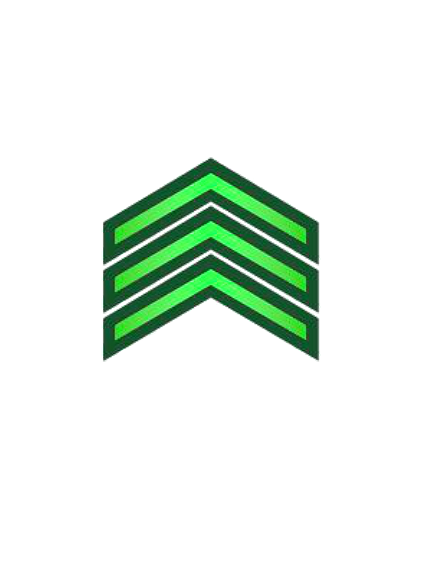
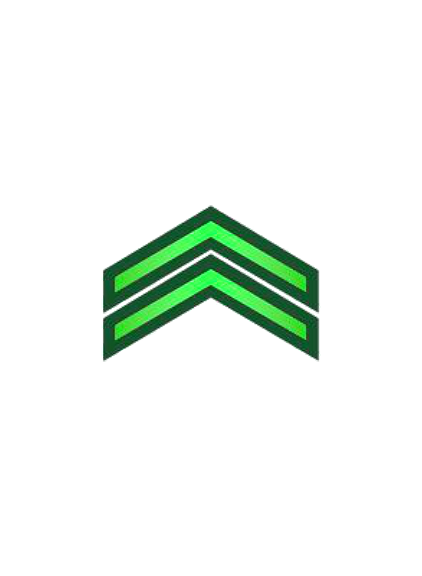
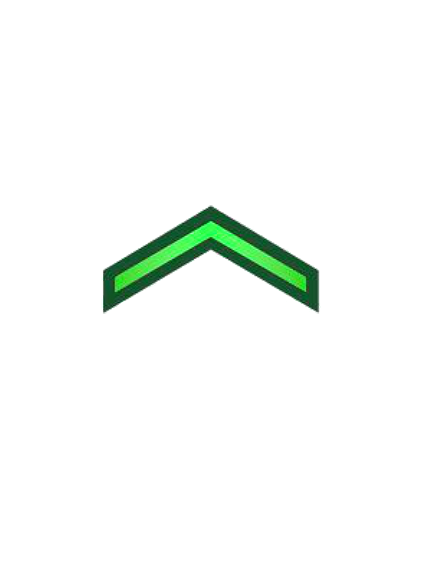
Rank group	Senior NCOs				Junior NCOs	Enlisted
(Saudi Arabia) General Directorate of Public Security							No insignia
(Saudi Arabia) General Directorate of Public Security	رئيس رقباء; Rayiys ruqaba'	رقيب أول; Raqib 'awal	رقيب; Raqib	وكيل رقيب; Wakil raqib	عريف; Earif	جندي أول; Jundiun awwal	جندي; Jundiun

== See also ==
- Ministry of Interior
