= Kayala Airline =

Saudi Arabian airline

IATA	ICAO	Call sign
XY	KNE	-
- Founded: July 2005
- Ceased operations: April 2009
- Hubs: Jeddah-King Abdulaziz International Airport; Riyadh-King Khalid International Airport
- Fleet size: 4
- Destinations: 3
- Parent company: National Air Services (NAS)
- Headquarters: Jeddah, Saudi Arabia

Kayala Airline was an airline based in Jeddah, Saudi Arabia. Kayala was a privately owned premium class airline operating domestic and international scheduled as well as charter services. Its main base was King Abdulaziz International Airport, Jeddah, with a further base at King Khalid International Airport, Riyadh.

== History ==
The airline started operations on 16 July 2005 and was wholly owned by Saudi aviation company National Air Services. Until 6 May 2008, the airline was known as Al-Khayala. On 1 April 2009, bankruptcy was declared and all operations were ceased.

== Destinations ==
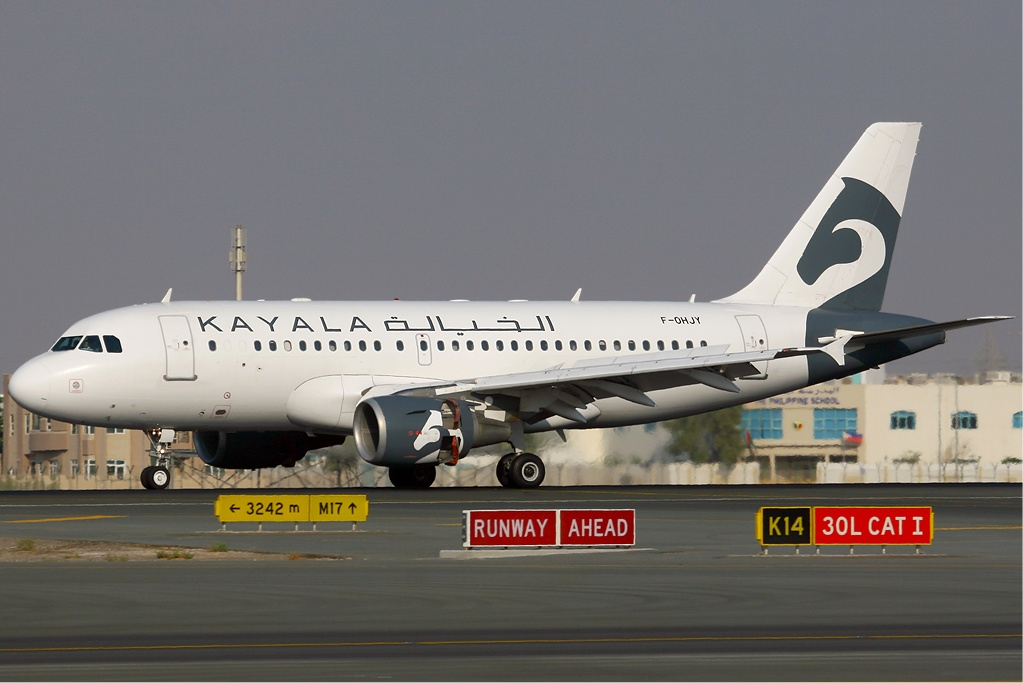
Kayala Airlines Airbus A319-100

As of May 2008, the following destinations were served:

Saudi Arabia

- Jeddah (King Abdulaziz International Airport)
- Riyadh (King Khalid International Airport)

United Arab Emirates

- Dubai (Dubai International Airport)

== Fleet ==
The Kayala Airline fleet consisted of the following aircraft (as of February 2008), which all were operated by National Air Services:

- 3 Airbus A319-100
- 1 Airbus A320-200

== See also ==
- List of defunct airlines of Saudi Arabia
