= Awwad Eid Al-Aradi Al-Balawi =

Saudi Arabian Vice Admiral (b. 1955)

Vice Admiral Awwad Eid Al-Aradi Al-Balawi Former Director General of Saudi Arabian Border Guards
- Born: February 23, 1955 (age 71)
- Allegiance: Saudi Arabia
- Branch: Saudi Arabian Border Guards
- Service years: 1973–2020
- Rank: Vice Admiral
- Awards: 1st Class King Faisal Medal

Vice Admiral (rtd) Awwad Eid Al-Aradi Al-Balawi (Arabic: عواد بن عيد العرادي البلوي), the Director General of Saudi Arabian Border Guards till 20 Aug. 2020 and appointed as a member of the Shura Council on 2nd Sep. 2024. He was the chairman and the head of the scientific Committee of the 1st International Symposium for the safety and security of land and maritime borders in Jeddah. He was a member of the delegate of the Kingdom of Saudi Arabia to the International Maritime Organization IMO and represent the Kingdom as a Member of the Council and in the General Assembly of IMO. Vice Adm. Al-Balawi chaired several high-level meetings for the signatory states of Djibouti Code of Conduct which resulted in the adoption of Jeddah Amendments in 2017 as the Code was reviewed and expanded to include combating piracy and armed robbery of ships as well as illegal maritime activities in the western Indian Ocean and Gulf of Aden.

He chaired the Permanent Committee to Manage Maritime Disasters.

== Early life and career ==
Vice Admiral Al-Aradi obtained Master of Science in Maritime Management from WMU, Sweden (GMAI 1988). He graduated from Pakistan Naval Academy, Karachi.

- Commander of The Security Unit of King Abdul Aziz seaport
- Director of Military Operations Dept. in the Eastern Region
- Director of the General Directorate of Maritime logistics Support in Maritime Affairs – Riyadh
- Assistant Director General for Maritime Affairs
- Deputy Director General of Border Guard
- Director General of Border Guard (Appointed on 19 Aug 2014)
- Promoted to vice admiral (14 July 2016)

He was appointed as the chairman of the first International Symposium on Land and Maritime Border Security and Safety in Jeddah and the Chairman of the Scientific Committee. Vice Admiral Al-Balawi is the delegate of Saudi Arabia to the International Maritime Organisation (IMO) and is a part of the council and the board. He has chaired several high-level meetings of signatories resulting in ‘Jeddah Amendment to Djibouti Code of Conduct 2017, and revisions of the code of conduct for the repression of piracy, armed robbery against ships and illicit maritime activity in the western Indian Ocean and the Gulf of Aden Area. He has also been the chairman of standing committee for the management of maritime disasters.

== Honour and recognition ==
- The award of Excellence in the domain of Border Security and Safety at the National Security Middle East Conference held in Abu Dhabi-UAE(28-29 August 2016)
- Awarded the rank and dignity of knight of the National order of June from Djiboutian Prime Minister Abdulkader Kamil Mohamed for his outstanding service and assistance given to Djiboutian Coast Guard and support to DCoC's signatory states.
- 1st Class King Faisal Medal (7 September 2017)
