= Abdullah al-Asiri =

Al-Qaeda suicide bomber

Abdullah Hassan al-Asiri
- Born: 1986; Riyadh, Saudi Arabia
- Died: 27 August 2009 (aged 22–23); Jeddah, Saudi Arabia
- Cause of death: Suicide bombing
- Other names: Abdullah Hassan Tali' al-Asiri; Abdullah al-Asiri; Abul Khair
- Citizenship: Saudi Arabia
- Known for: Attempting to assassinate Muhammad bin Nayef
- Relatives: Ibrahim al-Asiri (older brother)

Abdullah Hassan al-Asiri (Arabic: عبد الله حسن عسيري) (1986 – 27 August 2009) was a Saudi Arabian member of al-Qaeda in the Arabian Peninsula. His name is an ascription to the Asir Province of Saudi Arabia. He died in August 2009 while attempting to assassinate Saudi Arabia's Deputy Minister of the Interior, Muhammad bin Nayef, with a suicide bomb hidden in his rectum.

== Biography ==
Al-Asiri was recruited into al-Qaeda by his older brother Ibrahim al-Asiri, and the two brothers visited Yemen in 2007.

He was named on a Saudi list of most wanted terrorist suspects on 3 February 2009.

== Death ==
In August 2009 he spoke to Muhammad bin Nayef and expressed a desire to surrender to the authorities as part of the country's terrorist rehabilitation program, and they agreed to meet. A few days later, on 27 August 2009 Asiri queued up at Muhammad bin Nayef's Jeddah palace as a "well-wisher," a tradition in the kingdom during Ramadan. Assisted by his older brother, Ibrahim al-Asiri, he had hidden a pound (about 0.45 kg) of PETN plastic explosives in his rectum and anal canal, described by security experts as a novel technique. He exploded the bomb (perhaps with a mobile phone), killing himself, but only lightly injuring bin Nayef who was protected from the full force of the blast by Asiri's body.

Asiri had passed through a metal detector and remained in the security of the Prince's bodyguards for over 24 hours before gaining the audience. "I did not want him to be searched, but he surprised me by blowing himself up," said Muhammad bin Nayef.

According to Bruce Riedel, a former CIA officer and director of the Intelligence Project at the Brookings Institution, "the weight of the evidence I have seen is that [bin Nayef] was more injured in the assassination attempt than was admitted." To treat his injuries the prince "got onto a pain killer routine that was very addictive. I think that problem got progressively worse." According to The New York Times, citing "an associate of the royal family", the prince's alleged addiction was cited to "strengthen support for the sudden change in the line of succession" that removed bin Nayef from office.

This was the first assassination attempt against a royal family member since 2003, when Saudi Arabia faced a sharp increase in al-Qaeda linked attacks. A Yemeni, Rayed Abdullah Salem Al Harbi, assisted Asiri in preparing for his suicide mission.

== See also ==
- Mohammed Abdel Karim Al Ghezali
