= Nayef bin Abdulaziz =

Saudi royal and politician (1934–2012)

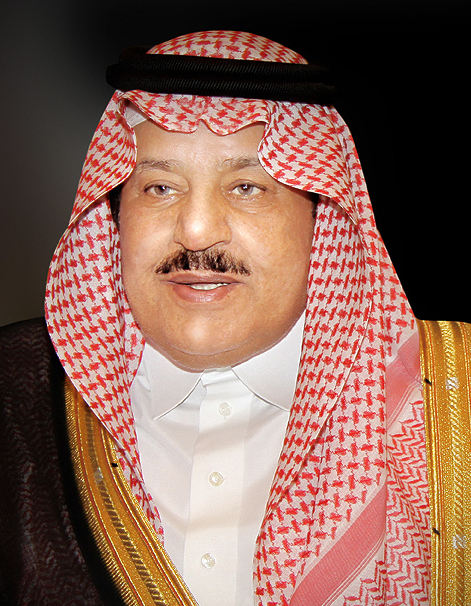
- Nayef in 2011

Crown Prince of Saudi Arabia First Deputy Prime Minister
- Tenure: 27 October 2011 – 16 June 2012
- Monarch: Abdullah
- Prime Minister: King Abdullah
- Predecessor: Sultan bin Abdulaziz
- Successor: Salman bin Abdulaziz

Second Deputy Prime Minister
- Tenure: 27 March 2009 – 27 October 2011
- Monarch: Abdullah
- Prime Minister: King Abdullah
- Predecessor: Sultan bin Abdulaziz
- Successor: Muqrin bin Abdulaziz

Minister of Interior
- Tenure: 11 October 1975 – 16 June 2012
- Prime Minister: King Khalid; King Fahd; King Abdullah
- Predecessor: Fahd bin Abdulaziz
- Successor: Ahmed bin Abdulaziz
- Born: 9 October 1934; Taif, Saudi Arabia
- Died: 16 June 2012 (aged 77); Geneva, Switzerland
- Burial: 17 June 2012; Al-Adl cemetery, Makkah
- Spouses: Noura Alfarraj Alsubaie; Al Jawhara bint Abdulaziz Al Jiluwi; Maha bint Mohammed Al Sudairi
- Issue: List: Princess Jawahir; Princess Noura; Prince Saud; Crown Prince Muhammad; Prince Nawwaf; Prince Fahd; and four others
Names
- Nayef bin Abdulaziz bin Abdul Rahman
- House: Al Saud
- Father: Abdulaziz of Saudi Arabia
- Mother: Hassa bint Ahmed Al Sudairi

Nayef bin Abdulaziz Al Saud (Arabic: نايف بن عبد العزيز آل سعود, Nāyif ibn ‘Abd al ‘Azīz Āl Su‘ūd; 9 October 1934 – 16 June 2012) was the crown prince of Saudi Arabia and deputy prime minister from October 2011 and the minister of interior from October 1975 until his death in June 2012.

== Early life and education ==
Nayef bin Abdulaziz was born in Ta'if on 9 October 1934 to King Abdulaziz and Hassa bint Ahmed Al Sudairi, making him one of the Sudairi Seven. His full brothers included Fahd and Salman, who would both become kings of Saudi Arabia, and Prince Sultan bin Abdulaziz (later crown prince of Saudi Arabia). Nayef was the twenty-third son of King Abdulaziz. Prince Nayef received education at Princes' School and from senior ulema (Muslim religious scholars). Additionally, he was educated in diplomacy and security affairs.

== Early experience ==
From 1952 to 1953 Prince Nayef served as vice governor of Riyadh Province. In 1953, he was appointed as the governor of Riyadh province and stayed in this post for one year. He then served as governor of the Medina Region. In 1970 King Faisal appointed him as both deputy interior minister and minister of state for internal affairs.

== Minister of Interior ==
On 30 March 1975 following King Faisal's assassination, then Minister of Interior Prince Fahd became the crown prince, and Prince Nayef was appointed to the post by King Khalid.

=== Timeline ===
In March 1980 King Khalid established a constitutional committee with eight members under the presidency of Prince Nayef. However, the committee could not manage to produce the basic law that had been promised. From 1992 Prince Nayef's influence increased over provincial governors through the Law of Provinces. In December 1994, he ordered hundreds of terrorism-related arrests with the support of Prince Turki, head of Saudi intelligence services.

Prince Nayef established the General Directorate of Prisons in 2000 as a separate unit within the ministry. In April 2001, he, not foreign minister Saud bin Faisal, went to Iran as Saudi envoy in an unprecedented move. He issued all women in Saudi Arabia identity cards. Women were previously registered under their husband's or father's name in November 2001. After the September 11 attacks, as the man in charge of the Saudi investigation he received US criticism for his continuing to insist that the Saudi hijackers were dupes in a Zionist plot for over a year after 9/11, and for not undertaking sufficient action against extremists.

In 2003 Prince Nayef, who was in charge of foreign labor, decreed that foreign workers and their family members should not exceed 20 percent of the Saudi population in 2013. Senator Charles Schumer lobbied through Prince Bandar to remove Prince Nayef as minister of interior in July 2003.

Between 2003 and 2006 Prince Nayef led Saudi Arabia's confrontation against Al Qaeda, which sponsored a series of domestic attacks on expatriate housing compounds, oil infrastructure, and industrial facilities. His political stance was strengthened because of increased media exposure and the successful end to terrorist attacks.

Styles of Crown Prince Nayef
- Reference style: His Royal Highness
- Spoken style: Your Royal Highness

In March 2011 during the 2011 Saudi Arabian protests 200 people who called for more information on their imprisoned relatives were denied a meeting with Nayef.

== Second deputy prime minister ==
Since Crown Prince Sultan could not deal with demanding duties due to his extended absences for medical treatment and King Abdullah was about to travel to Doha to attend the League of Arab States Summit before going to London for the G20 summit, it was imperative to leave a senior official in charge, which added burdens to the leukemia-suffering 76-year-old Nayef. Therefore, on 27 March 2009 Prince Nayef was made second deputy prime minister. His appointment caused a public split in the royal family. Prince Talal asked the King to clarify that the appointment did not necessarily mean that Nayef would become crown prince.

His appointment as second deputy prime minister expanded Prince Nayef's influence into all corners of Saudi domestic policy and allowed him to participate in the development of foreign policy. He was not expected to interfere in economic matters, but to influence the judiciary.

Prince Nayef chaired many cabinet meetings when King Abdullah and Crown Prince Sultan were away for health reasons. Critics said he was behind the cancellation of the nation's only film festival in the summer of 2009. In November 2010 he undertook all Hajj-related responsibilities. In some government offices, his picture was added next to King Abdulaziz, King Abdullah, and Crown Prince Sultan.

== Crown Prince and first deputy prime minister ==
Prince Nayef was appointed crown prince and first deputy prime minister by King Abdullah on 27 October 2011, five days after the death of Crown Prince Sultan. Shortly thereafter he vowed that Saudi Arabia would "never sway from and never compromise on" its adherence to Wahhabi doctrine which he stated was "the source of the kingdom's pride, success and progress."

During his time as crown prince, Nayef brought about modernizations such as "removing religious authorities who objected to the mingling of men and women in public spaces."

=== Influence ===
Prince Nayef's career was propelled by his full-brother King Fahd. Under Fahd, the Ministry of Interior became one of the most influential bureaucracies in Saudi Arabia. Prince Nayef served as a mediator in disputes between King Fahd and Prince Sultan. As King Fahd's health deteriorated, his power gradually diminished as well. In 2003 he "threatened to cancel certain business deals with the French government" if the narcotics investigation of Nayef bin Fawwaz Al Sha'lan continued.

When meeting with US diplomats in 2009 Prince Nayef voiced support for aggressive activity against Iran after what he believed was a breach of the 2001 security agreement. He urged European nations to turn in suspected terrorists and asked for US intercession. He said the most effective way to combat extremism was through Friday sermons.

As Crown Prince, Nayef was the most influential of the Sudairi Seven. He delegated the day-to-day responsibilities of his ministry to his son, Prince Muhammad bin Nayef and then-deputy minister Prince Ahmed. Prince Nayef had members of the ministry of interior placed in all overseas embassies.

== Various positions ==
Prince Nayef served for a time as the supervisor general of the Saudi committee for the Al Quds intifada, which provided aid to Palestinian refugees. He headed the supreme council on information which oversaw the media and regulated the internet in the country. He also chaired the supreme committee on the Hajj and headed the ministerial committee on morality and the ministerial oversight committee on the World Trade Organization.

== Views ==
Prince Nayef was considered to be one of the more conservative, but also pragmatic, members of the Al Saud family. He viewed the potential erosion of the official Wahhabi-Salafi doctrine as a diminishing of the core legitimacy of the state itself and resisted such moves, not from a pronounced sense of religious devotion, but rather a desire to maintain a firm grip on the levers of state power.

In November 2002 Prince Nayef said, "It is impossible that 19 youths carried out the operation of September 11, or that bin Laden or al Qaeda did that alone. ... I think [the Zionists] are behind these events." He later proposed that Americans visiting the Kingdom should be fingerprinted like visitors to the United States.

According to leaked cables, Prince Nayef argued for a tougher approach than King Abdullah towards the then Yemeni president Saleh in 2009.

His motto was "no to change, yes to development". He believed that no change is necessary in Saudi Arabia: “Change means changing something that already exists. Whatever exists in the Kingdom is already well-established; however, there is a scope for development – development that does not clash with the principles of the nation”. In a similar vein, in March 2009, he publicly stated that he saw no need for either elections or women in government.

After visiting Cleveland for planned health-tests in March 2012, Prince Nayef addressed the controversy over the participation of Saudi women athletes at the 2012 Summer Olympics in London from his residence in Algeria. Al Hayat reported that for him women can represent Saudi Arabia at the Olympics as long as they do not break Islamic laws. His approval was conditioned on women competing in sports that "meet the standards of women's decency and don't contradict Islamic laws", though even this concession seemed surprising. However, only a few days later, his statement led to other statements by Saudi officials. At a press conference in Jeddah, the head of the Saudi Olympic Committee, Nawwaf bin Faisal, explicitly stated that Saudi women athletes would not be sent to the Olympics: "We are not endorsing any Saudi female participation at the moment in the Olympics or other international championships." He further added that Saudi women taking part on their own are free to do so, and the Kingdom's Olympic authority would "help in ensuring that their participation does not violate the Islamic shari'a law." Though he did emphasize that this was in accordance with a previously stated position, it did seem a rebuff to Crown Prince Nayef.

== Personality ==
Prince Nayef, before being appointed second deputy prime minister in 2009, was generally described as elusive, ambiguous, pragmatic, unimaginative, shrewd, and outspoken. According to leaked cables, he had a reputation of being anti-Western, but tended to do business if there were shared interests. It is further stated that his conservative approach did not reflect his personal religious personality . However, his conservative views allowed him to gain support from social and religious conservatives. He seemed to be reserved and even a bit shy. He was described as neither well-spoken nor articulate, and had a tendency to repeat platitudes in private as well as in public. He did appear to understand and speak at least some English. On the other hand, Prince Nayef was considered by other princes to be one of the kinder members of his royal generation in his approach towards nephews and nieces.

Prince Nayef and his full brother and then-deputy interior minister, Prince Ahmed, were reported to pay massive bonuses to successful security officers. They both also had a reputation for honesty and using the security budget only for the stated purposes, not enriching themselves.

== Personal life ==
Prince Nayef married three times. He was the father of ten children.

His first wife was Noura Alfarraj Alsubaie who died in August 1994. His child from this marriage is Jawahir, wife of King Fahd's son, Mohammed bin Fahd, who is former governor of Eastern Province. Jawahir bint Nayef was raised by her aunt Princess Al Jawhara bint Abdulaziz Al Saud.

Al Jawhara bint Abdulaziz bin Musaid Al Jiluwi was his second spouse. His children from this marriage are Mohammed, Noura, Saud and Sara.

His third wife was Maha bint Mohammed Al Sudairi. They later divorced. They had five children: Nouf, Nawwaf, Mishail (born 1986), Hayfa and Fahd. His daughter, Nouf bint Nayef (born 1984), is the wife of Mohammed bin Abdullah, one of King Abdullah's sons. Nawwaf bin Nayef was arrested in March 2020 along with his half-brother Muhammad bin Nayef and his uncle Ahmed bin Abdulaziz.

In the early 1960s Prince Nayef lived in Loxwood House in the north London suburb of Totteridge. He donated £1,000 (equivalent to £17,709 in 2025) to his local member for parliament, Margaret Thatcher, when she was canvassing during the 1964 United Kingdom general election.

== Illness ==
Prince Nayef was said to be suffering from diabetes mellitus and osteoporosis as well as leukemia. In March 2012, he went to Morocco for a "private vacation", then to Cleveland for pre-planned medical tests. This news raised some speculation about his health and Saudi succession. He returned to Saudi Arabia after staying in Algeria in April 2012.

Prince Nayef again left Saudi Arabia for medical tests on 26 May 2012. Although it was unknown where Prince Nayef went, Prince Ahmed stated in Al Watan on 3 June 2012 that he was "well and in good health ... and he will soon return to Saudi Arabia". Before his death in June 2012, it was reported that Prince Nayef had gone to Geneva on 26 May 2012 for treatment for a knee ailment.

== Death and funeral ==
On 16 June 2012 at about 1 pm (UTC+3), Saudi state television reported that Crown Prince Nayef had died. According to Reuters, he died in Geneva, Switzerland. A medical source in Geneva said that Nayef died of "cardiac problems" while staying at his brother's residence there. His body was kept at the Geneva Mosque before being taken to Jeddah.

The royal court stated that his funeral would be held on 17 June 2012. It was reported that Crown Prince Nayef's body was brought from Geneva to Jeddah. Funeral prayers were held in the Masjid al-Haram, also known as the Grand Mosque, in Mecca after sunset prayer, led by Sheikh Saud Ash Shuraim. His body was buried in an unmarked grave in Al Adl cemetery in Mecca as per his wish on 17 June 2012.

Major political figures sent their condolences to King Abdullah, including US President Barack Obama, French President François Hollande, UK Foreign Minister William Hague, King Abdullah II of Jordan, Turkish President Abdullah Gul, and other leaders of Arab and Persian Gulf States.

== Legacy ==
On 6 July 2012 King Abdullah renamed the Qassim Regional Airport in Buraidah as the Prince Nayef bin Abdulaziz Regional Airport.

== Honours and awards ==
Prince Nayef was the recipient of several honours, including the military Order of the Cloud and Banner by Taiwan (1977), the Legion of Honor by France (1977), the Al Kawkab Decoration by Jordan (1977), the Order of National Security by Republic of Korea (1980), and the National Order of the Cedar by Lebanon (2009). In addition, he was awarded the followings;

- Order of Abdulaziz Al Saud (First Class)
- Order of the Liberator by Venezuela (1977)

Posthumously Prince Nayef was honoured by the United Nations with the Outstanding Donor Award for the Special Human Settlements Programme for the Palestinian People on 28 June 2013.

Saudi Arabian royalty
Preceded by Sultan	Crown Prince of Saudi Arabia; 27 October 2011 – 16 June 2012	Succeeded by Salman
Political offices
Preceded by	Vice Governor of Riyadh Province; 1952–1953	Succeeded by
Preceded by Sultan bin Abdulaziz Al Saud	Governor of Riyadh Province; 1953–1955	Succeeded by Salman bin Abdulaziz Al Saud
Preceded by Fahd bin Abdulaziz Al Saud	Deputy Minister of Interior and Minister of State for Internal Affairs; 1970 – March 1975	Succeeded by Vacant
Preceded by Fahd bin Abdulaziz Al Saud	Minister of Interior; 1975–2012	Succeeded by Ahmed bin Abdulaziz Al Saud
Preceded by Sultan bin Abdulaziz Al Saud	Second Deputy Prime Minister of Saudi Arabia; March 2009 – 27 October 2011	Succeeded by Muqrin bin Abdulaziz Al Saud
Preceded by Sultan bin Abdulaziz Al Saud	First Deputy Prime Minister of Saudi Arabia; 27 October 2011 – 16 June 2012	Succeeded by Salman bin Abdulaziz Al Saud
