= Krayem Awad =

Austrian artist

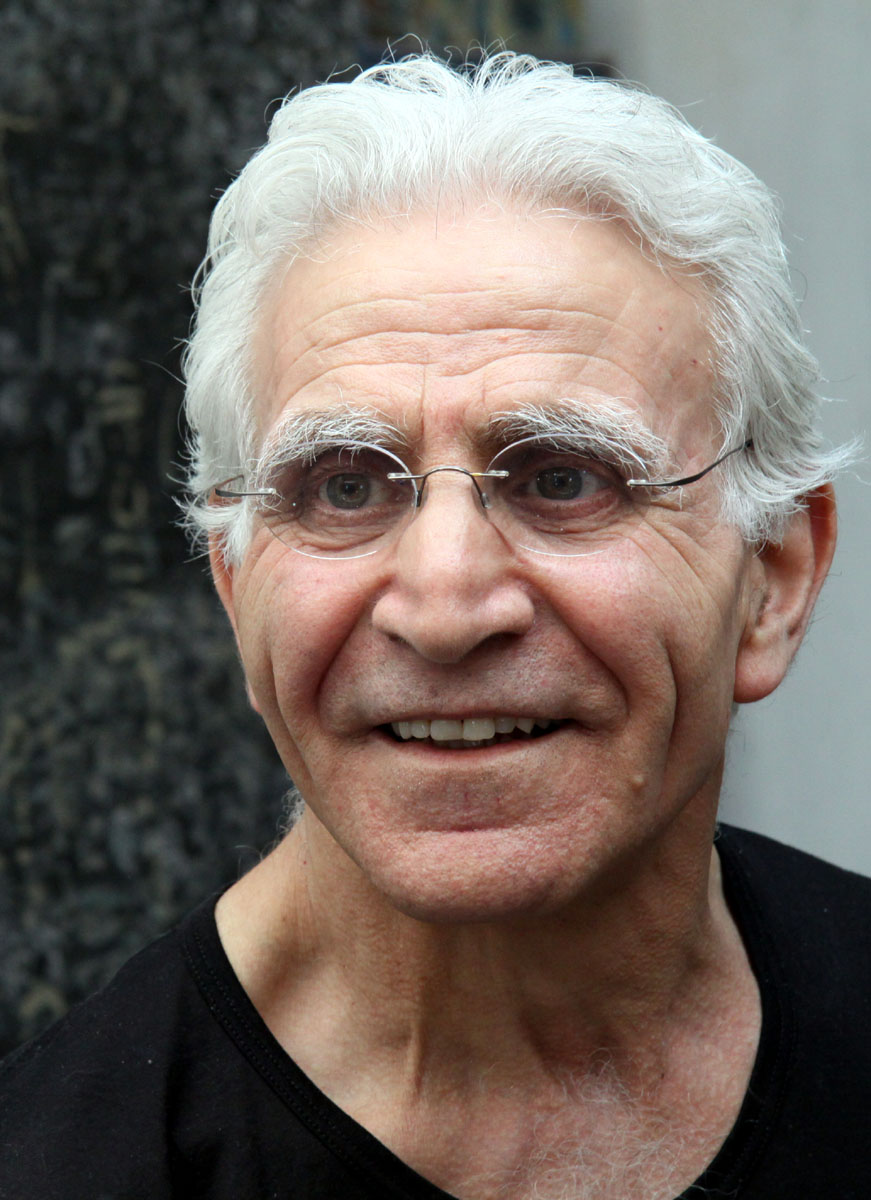
- Born: 1948 (age 77–78); Basir, Syria
- Education: Academy of Fine Arts Vienna
- Known for: Painter, sculptor, poet
- Movement: expressionism

Krayem Maria Awad (born 1948) is a Vienna-based painter, sculptor and poet of Syrian origin.

== Biography ==
He was born in Basir, and later moved to Austria, where he studied from 1968 telecommunications engineering at the Vienna Technical College, and was also enrolled at the Vienna School of Economics.

He also attended the Vienna Academy of Fine Arts.

In the 1970-1980s, he received international recognition for his numerous aquarelle work.

In the 1970s he participated in lectures as part of the creative movement "North-South Dialogue". He was a member of the editorial board of the magazine "Treffpunkte", and author of the manifesto "The Position of Women in European Civilization".

In 1977 he joined the art cooperative "Arbeitsgemeinschaft Kunst", offering courses in printing graphics and ceramics, and teaching at a summer art school in Vienna.

In the 1990s he worked with video installations, photography and computer graphics.

Since 1994, he has been involved in art-workshops and art courses in Switzerland.

Krayem uses mixed media when painting, mixing sand and ashes with oil-based pigments, and often supplements artwork with his own poetry.

Krayem often creates large format paintings, like the one titled "The whole", which measured 3x10 meters, and was on display at Vienna’s Jugendstiltheater in September 2008 de:Steinhof (Wien).

He is a member of the International Club of visual artists "Art/Diagonal".

Krayem's art work has been shown, as part of one man shows, in many European countries, as well as in Japan, South Africa, and the United States of America. His paintings are in public and private collections.

== Works ==
- 1975 Mamma Eve
- 1983 Wiener Kunsthefte 2/1983
- http://www.onb.ac.at/oe-literaturzeitschriften/
- 1984 Österreichische Aquarellisten der Gegenwart. Facultas/Maudrich Verlag ISBN 978-3-85175-378-3
- 1985 Aquarelle und Aphorismen
- 1990 Bewegung und Ursprung '
- 1991 Strukturen und Strukturveränderung
- 1991 Stilles Wasser
- 1991 Temps de quietude
- 1995 Krayem Objekte
- 1996 Berührung: Bilder und Ge danken, Published by Emi-Kunstverl. ISBN 3-9500632-0-X
- 2000 Toccare parola ed immagine. Emi Kunstverl. ISBN 3-9500632-2-6
- 2000 Krayem Malerei
- 2001 Krayem Paintings
- 2001 KrayemSculptures 1
- 2002 Krayem Raum und Körper
- 2002 Krayem Defragmentierung /
- 2002 Krayem Angels
- 2003 Krayem Defragmentierung I1.
- 2003 FACES
- 2004 Weltenfenster
- 2004 Zeit der Stille
- 2007 Das Tor Europa
- 2008 Doors
- 2009 Malen in Büroräumen
- 2011 Wege einer Leidenschaft
- 2013 Gesicht der Erde CH
- 2014 recovering I II III
- 2015 vom Klang der Stille. Universitätszahnklinik Wien
- 2016 Kunst und Heilkunst. Universitätszahnklinik Wien
- 2018 Fenster zum Humanismus. Galerie Meier CH
- 2019 Feminismus, luce dentro '
