= Ministry of Interior (Saudi Arabia) =

Government ministry of Saudi Arabia

- وزارة الداخلية
- Official logo used by the Ministry of Interior

- Official flag used by the Ministry of Interior

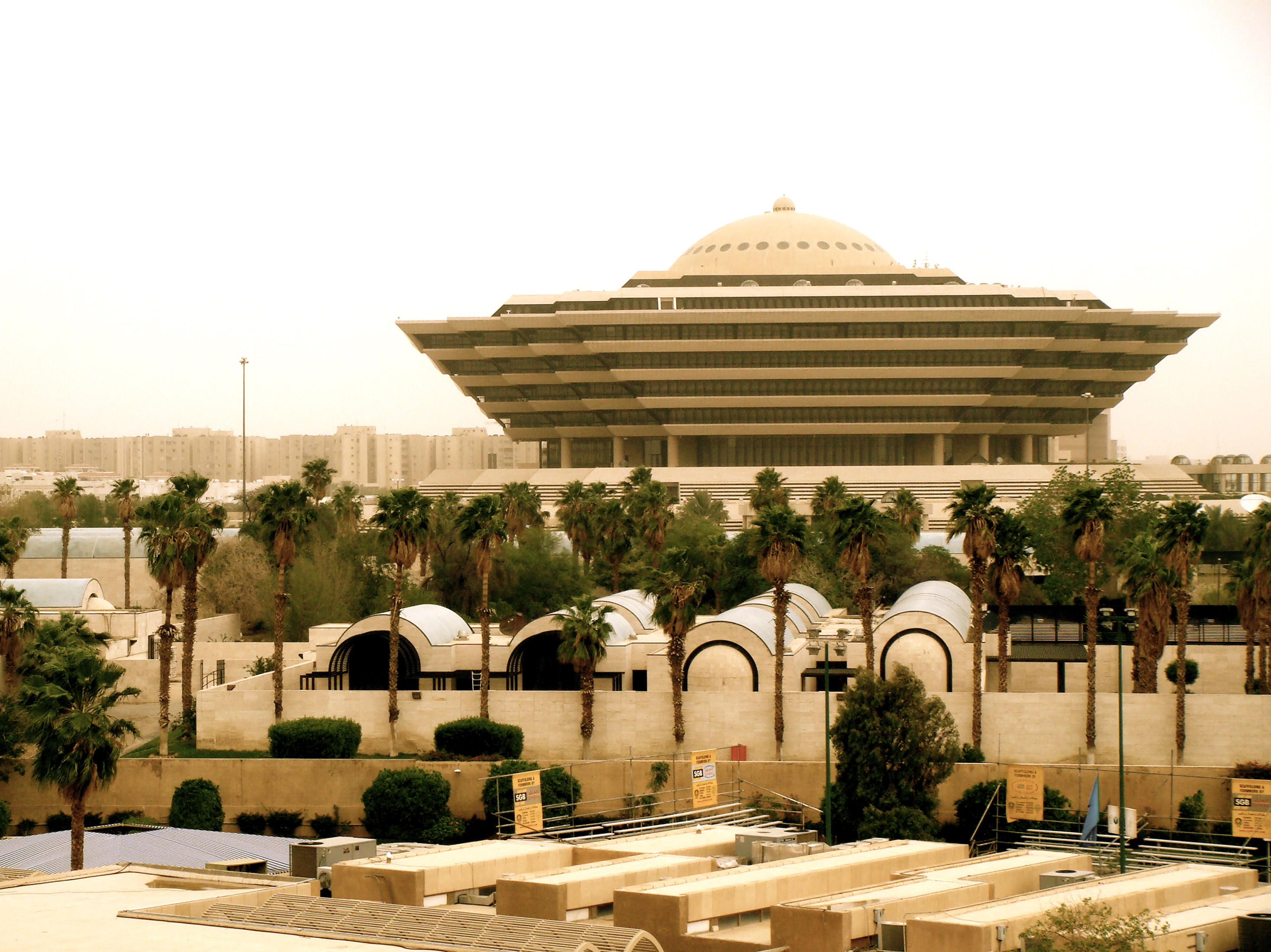
- Ministry of Interior Headquarters, 2007

Agency overview
- Formed: 8 January 1926; 100 years ago
- Jurisdiction: Government of Saudi Arabia
- Headquarters: Ministry of Interior building, Al Olaya, Riyadh 11543, Saudi Arabia
- Motto: A homeland we don't protect, we don't deserve to live in
- Employees: 5,000
- Agency executive: Prince Abdulaziz bin Saud Al Saud
- Website: moi.gov.sa

The Ministry of Interior (MoI; Arabic: وزارة الداخلية) is one of the governmental bodies of Saudi Arabia responsible for national security, naturalization, immigration, and customs in Saudi Arabia. It was founded in 1926 by King Abdulaziz, but the organization was reformed in 1951 when the combined ministerial body covering financial and interior affairs were separated. The current minister of interior, Abdulaziz bin Saud Al Saud, has been in office since 21 June 2017.

== History ==
The Ministry of Interior was created in 1926 by King Abdulaziz as a solution to end political unrest, tribal conflicts, and statelessness caused by the absence of a powerful central government. The goal of the organization is to serve the citizens and residents of Saudi Arabia, achieving security, stability, and tranquility.

== Objectives and Responsibilities ==
The minister of interior has several objectives and the ministry's mission is summarized as follows:

- Achieve security and stability Kingdom-wide, provide tranquility and safety for the citizens and fight against all means of crime to ensure the safety of Saudi society and its development.
- Ensure safety of Pilgrims in order to perform their rituals safely.
- Reinforce security relationships with neighboring Arab countries and cooperate with the Countries of Gulf Cooperation Council (GCC), to maintain safety in the Kingdom and abroad, control crime and drug smuggling, exchange security information, organize citizenship regulations and systems and other miscellaneous issues.
- Reinforce security cooperation with Arab countries to protect cultural possessions and achievements, support internal and external security, control crime, terrorism and drug smuggling and develop Arab security institutions.

== Divisions of Internal Security ==
The history and formation of the MOI and its various sectors passed through phases of administrative development and organization. The ministry consists of the following child agencies:

- MOI Agency for Military Affairs
- Crime Research Center
- General Directorate of Narcotics Control
- General Directorate of Public Security
- General Directorate of Investigations (Until 2017)
- Security Forces Organization
- Facilities Security Forces
- General Directorate of Border Guard
- General Department of Weapons and Explosives
- General Directorate of Civil Defence
- Ministerial Agency of Civil Affairs
- General Directorate of Intellectual Security
- MOI Agency for Security Capabilities
- National Information Center
- Development Projects Center
- General Directorate of the Mujahideen
- High Commission for Industrial Security
- General Directorate of Passports
- King Fahad Security College
- General Directorate of Prisons
- National Center for Security Operations
- Saudi National Central Bureau of INTERPOL
- General Department of Medical Services
- Special Forces for Security and Protection

== List of ministers ==
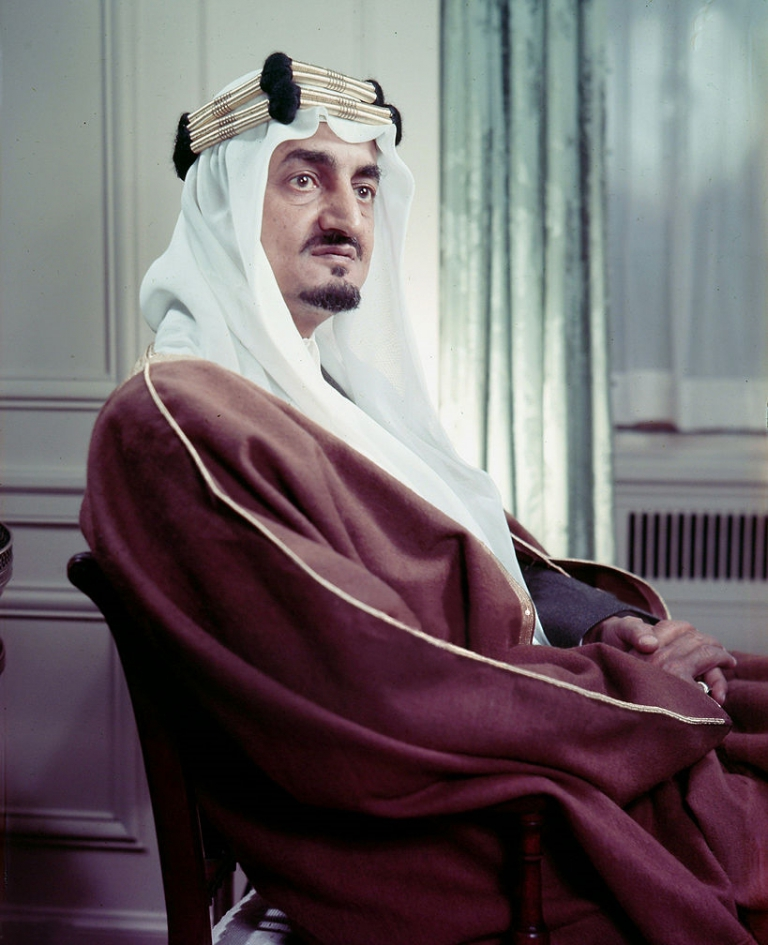
Faisal bin Abdulaziz, the first Minister of Interior

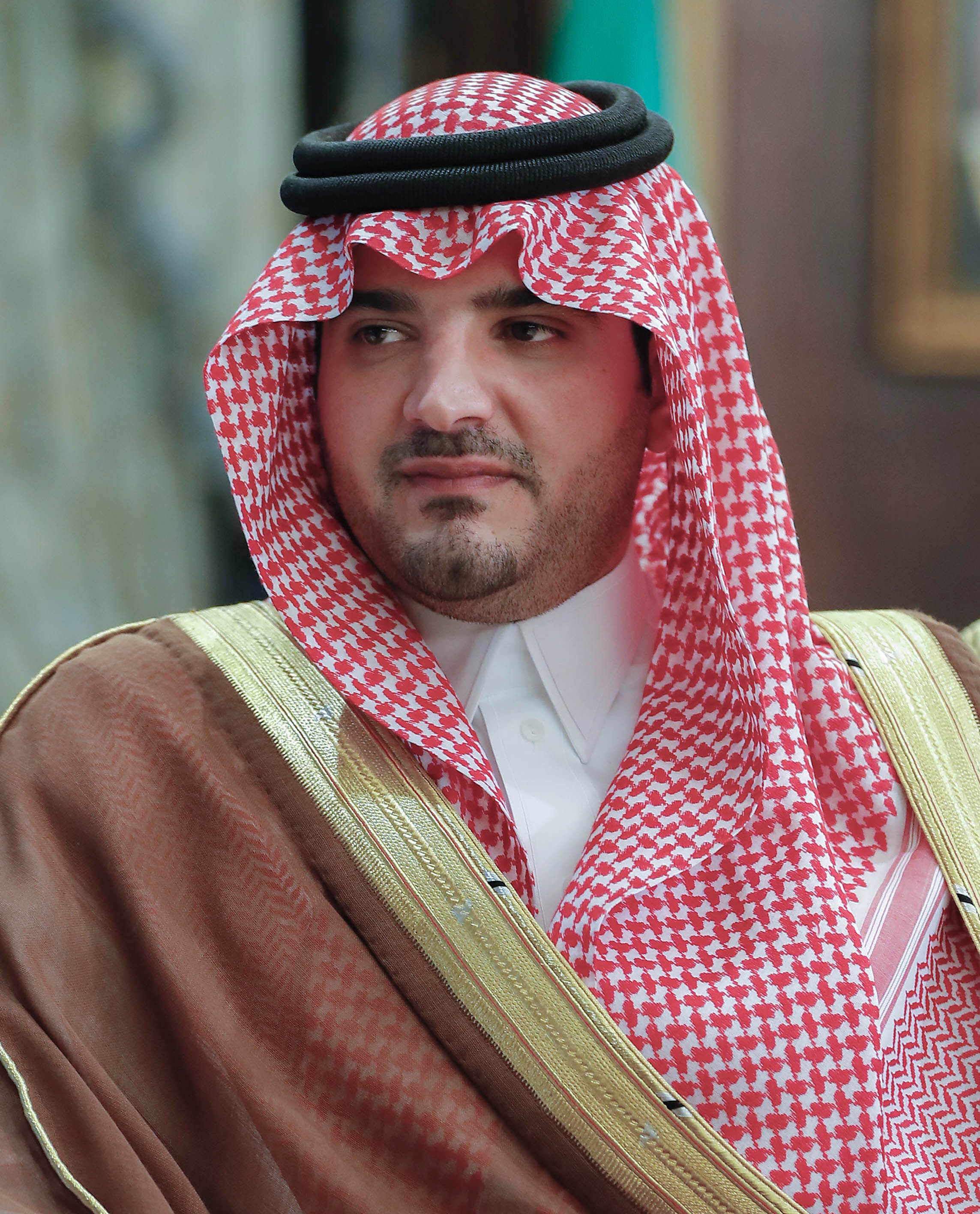
Abdulaziz bin Saud Al Saud, the incumbent Minister of Interior

- Faisal bin Abdulaziz (1931 – 1934)
- Abdullah bin Faisal Al Saud (1951 – 1959)
- Faisal bin Abdulaziz (1959 – 1960)
- Musaid bin Abdul Rahman Al Saud (1960)
- Abdul Muhsin bin Abdulaziz Al Saud (1960 – 1961)
- Faisal bin Turki I bin Abdulaziz Al Saud (1961 – 1962)
- Fahd bin Abdulaziz Al Saud (1962 – 1975)
- Nayef bin Abdulaziz Al Saud (11 October 1975 – 16 June 2012)
- Ahmed bin Abdulaziz Al Saud (18 June 2012 – 5 November 2012)
- Muhammad bin Nayef Al Saud (5 November 2012 – 21 June 2017)
- Abdulaziz bin Saud Al Saud (21 June 2017 – present)

== Aircraft inventory ==
Aircraft	Type	Versions	In service	Notes
Sikorsky S-70	Utility/transport helicopter	S-70i	3	
Sikorsky S-92	Utility/transport helicopter	S-92	17	Some are armed with machine guns
Sikorsky S-434	Training helicopter	S-434	9	Used for training
Kawasaki-Vertol 107	Utility	KV-107IIA-SM-1	7	Used for firefighting
Kawasaki-Vertol 107	Utility/transport	KV-107IIA-SM-2	4	Aeromedical and rescue helicopter
Kawasaki-Vertol 107	Transport	KV-107IIA-SM-3	2	VIP transport
Kawasaki-Vertol 107	Utility/transport	KV-107IIA-SM-4	3	Air ambulance
EADS CASA C-295	Transport	C-295W	4	

== See also ==
- Ministries of Saudi Arabia
- Legal system of Saudi Arabia
