= Muhammad bin Nayef =

Saudi royal (born 1959)

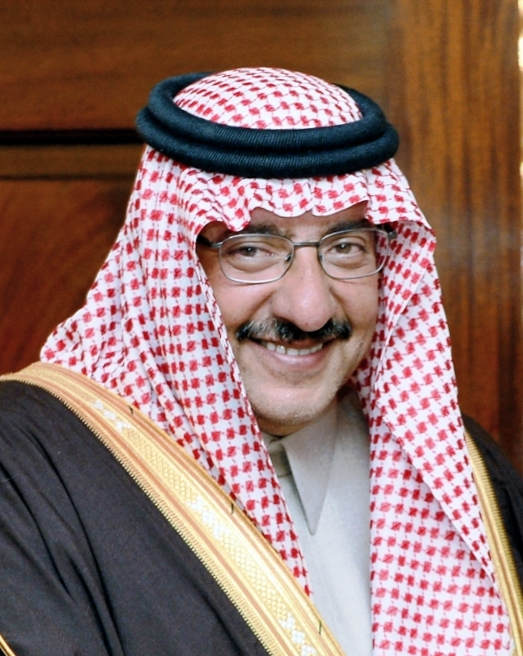
- Muhammad in 2013

Crown Prince and First Deputy Prime Minister of Saudi Arabia
- In office 29 April 2015 – 21 June 2017
- Monarch: Salman
- Prime Minister: Salman
- Preceded by: Muqrin bin Abdulaziz
- Succeeded by: Mohammed bin Salman

Deputy Crown Prince and Second Deputy Prime Minister of Saudi Arabia
- In office 23 January 2015 – 29 April 2015
- Monarch: Salman
- Prime Minister: Salman
- Preceded by: Muqrin bin Abdulaziz
- Succeeded by: Mohammed bin Salman

Chairman of the Council of Political and Security Affairs
- In office 29 April 2015 – 21 June 2017
- Monarch: Salman
- Prime Minister: Salman
- Preceded by: Mohammed bin Salman

Minister of Interior
- In office 5 November 2012 – 21 June 2017
- Monarchs: Abdullah; Salman
- Prime Minister: Abdullah; Salman
- Preceded by: Ahmed bin Abdulaziz
- Succeeded by: Abdulaziz bin Saud
- Born: 30 August 1959 (age 67); Jeddah, Saudi Arabia
- Spouse: Reema bint Sultan Al Saud
- Issue: Princess Sarah; Princess Lulua
Names
- Muhammad bin Nayef bin Abdulaziz Al Saud
- House: Al Saud
- Father: Nayef bin Abdulaziz Al Saud
- Mother: Al Jawhara bint Abdulaziz Al Jiluwi

Muhammad bin Nayef Al Saud (Note: His name is also spelled Mohammed, and his father's name is also spelled Naif.) (Arabic: محمد بن نايف آل سعود, romanized: Muḥammad bin Nāyif Āl Su‘ūd; born 30 August 1959), colloquially known by his initials MBN or MbN, is a Saudi Arabian former politician and businessman who served as the crown prince and first deputy prime minister of Saudi Arabia from 2015 to 2017 and as the minister of interior from 2012 to 2017. Prince Muhammad is a grandson of the founding monarch, King Abdulaziz, and son of the former crown prince and minister of interior Nayef bin Abdulaziz. Muhammad and Nayef were the first father-son duo in Saudi history to serve as crown prince. Muhammad's uncle King Salman named him as crown prince on 29 April 2015. On 21 June 2017 the king appointed his own son, Mohammed bin Salman, as crown prince and relieved Muhammad bin Nayef of all positions. He has been in detention since 6 March 2020 along with his uncle Ahmed and his half-brother Nawwaf.

== Early life and education ==
Muhammad bin Nayef was born in Jeddah on 30 August 1959. He is one of ten children of Prince Nayef bin Abdulaziz, himself a son of King Abdulaziz and full brother of King Fahd and King Salman. Prince Muhammad has an older brother, Saud bin Nayef, and two younger half-brothers, Nawwaf bin Nayef and Fahd bin Nayef. His mother, Al Jawhara bint Abdulaziz bin Musaed, was a member of the Al Jiluwi branch of the House of Saud. She died in July 2019.

Muhammad bin Nayef studied in the United States. There he received a bachelor's degree in political science in 1981. He took courses at Lewis & Clark College, but did not receive a degree. He attended the FBI's security courses from 1985 to 1988, and trained with Scotland Yard's anti-terrorism units from 1992 to 1994.

== Career ==
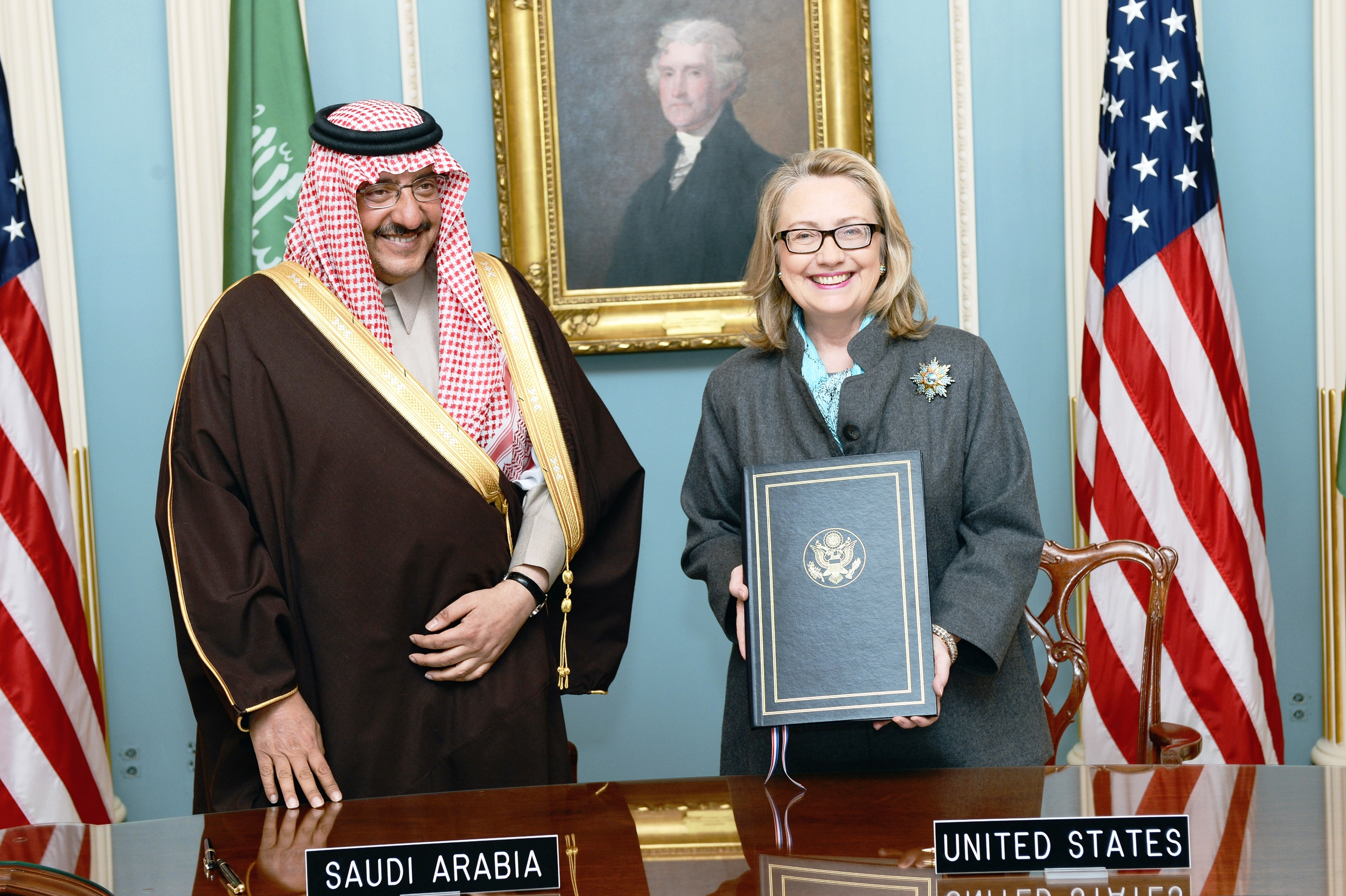
Muhammad bin Nayef with U.S. Secretary of State Hillary Clinton, 16 January 2013

=== Early career ===
Muhammad bin Nayef was appointed assistant interior minister for security affairs in 1999. He had been a businessman before this appointment. He was widely credited for the success of the Saudi counter-terrorism program, and was regarded as the architect of the government's counter-insurgency program. He also served as the director of civil defense during his term as assistant minister. He was considered to be an effective assistant interior minister.

In 2004, Muhammad bin Nayef was appointed to the rank of minister, becoming number two at the Ministry of Interior. In October 2010, he warned the U.S. Deputy National Security Adviser of an al-Qaeda plot to bomb transatlantic cargo aircraft. After the appointment of Prince Ahmed bin Abdulaziz Al Saud as interior minister upon Prince Nayef's death in July 2012, Prince Muhammad became deputy interior minister.

In November 2009, King Abdullah appointed Muhammad as a member of the influential Supreme Economic Council of Saudi Arabia. This move was regarded as approval of the increase in then-Crown Prince Nayef's power by King Abdullah. On the other hand, this appointment enabled Prince Muhammad to extend his influence over the government's economy policy.

On 5 November 2012, King Abdullah issued a royal decree and dismissed Prince Ahmed as minister of interior and appointed Prince Muhammad to the post. He became the tenth interior minister of Saudi Arabia. Prince Muhammad took the oath of office in front of King Abdullah on 6 November 2012. His appointment was criticized by human rights activists due to Prince Muhammad's professional experience as a tough enforcer who imprisoned thousands of suspected troublemakers in Saudi Arabia. However, he was regarded as less corrupt and less likely to abuse his power in comparison to other senior princes of his generation.

In January 2013, Prince Muhammad met with British Prime Minister David Cameron in London. and U.S. President Barack Obama in Washington. In late January 2013, Prince Muhammad announced that Saudi women would be allowed to work at the Saudi intelligence agency.

In February 2014, Prince Muhammad replaced Bandar bin Sultan, then intelligence chief of Saudi Arabia, and was placed in charge of Saudi intelligence in Syria. Muhammad was assisted in this effort by Prince Mutaib bin Abdullah, the minister of the Saudi Arabian National Guard.

Until his ouster in June 2017, Muhammad bin Nayef had spent 15 years as Saudi Arabia's most influential security official; he maintained close connections with American and British intelligence communities. On 10 February 2017, the U.S. Central Intelligence Agency (CIA) granted its "George Tenet Medal" to Prince Muhammad for what the agency called his "excellent intelligence performance, in the domain of counter-terrorism and his unbound contribution to realize world security and peace". The medal, named after George Tenet, CIA's longest-serving director, from 1996 to 2004, was handed to him by the newly appointed CIA director Mike Pompeo during a reception ceremony in Riyadh in the presence of minister of defense Mohammed bin Salman Al Saud. It was the first reaffirmation of ties between the Islamic monarchy and United States since President Donald Trump took office on 20 January 2017. The reception was attended by senior civil and military officials and by the U.S. Charge d'affaires to the Kingdom, Christopher Hensel. Prince Muhammed and Pompeo discussed security with Turkish officials, and said Saudi Arabia's relationship with the U.S. is "historic and strategic". He added that the move shows Washington's recognition of what he called Riyadh's anti-terrorism efforts.

=== Views ===
In the mid-2000s, Muhammad bin Nayef, unlike most of the royal family, talked to the media. Like his father, Prince Nayef, he took a hard line against terrorism in Saudi Arabia. He, and other decision-making elites, asserted that terrorism must be treated as a form of crime and fought with ruthless policing methods. Walid Jumblatt described Muhammad bin Nayef as the Saudi equivalent of General Ashraf Rifi, former director-general of Lebanon's Internal Security Forces.

Muhammad bin Nayef was commended by Western intelligence agencies for Saudi Arabia's counterterrorism programs. After his appointment as interior minister, U.S. diplomats viewed him as "the most pro-American minister" within the Saudi Arabian cabinet.

=== Influence ===
In 2011, The Economist described Prince Muhammad as energetic and low-key, and stated that he was one of the candidates for the throne when the line of succession passes to the grandsons of King Abdulaziz. He was also considered to be one of the possible contenders after his father's death in June 2012. In 2011, Michael Hayden reported that Prince Muhammad was the world's fifth most powerful defender. In April 2016, Prince Muhammad was named by Time as one of the 100 Most Influential People.

=== Assassination attempts ===
Muhammad bin Nayef has escaped four assassination attempts. He was injured in the third attempt, and unhurt in the others.

The third attempt was on 27 August 2009. Muhammad bin Nayef was injured by Abdullah al-Asiri, a suicide bomber linked to Al-Qaeda in the Arabian Peninsula. Al-Asiri spoke to Muhammad bin Nayef a few days prior to the bombing, and expressed a desire to surrender himself to the authorities as part of the country's terrorist rehabilitation program. This was apparently a plot to get admitted to the Prince's palace. Al-Asiri is believed to have traveled to Jeddah from the Yemeni province of Marib. During Ramadan, al-Asiri waited in line at the Prince's palace as a "well-wisher". He exploded a suicide bomb, killing himself, but apparently only slightly injuring Muhammad bin Nayef, who was protected from the full force of the blast by al-Asiri's body. The explosive device was hidden inside al-Asiri's rectum and anal canal, which security experts described as a novel technique. Muhammad bin Nayef appeared on state television with a bandage around two of his fingers on his left hand. He stated, "I did not want him to be searched, but he surprised me by blowing himself up."

According to Bruce Riedel, a former CIA officer and director of the Intelligence Project at the Brookings Institution, "the weight of the evidence I have seen is that [bin Nayef] was more injured in the assassination attempt than was admitted." To treat his injuries the prince "got onto a pain killer routine that was very addictive. I think that problem got progressively worse." According to The New York Times, citing "an associate of the royal family", the prince's alleged addiction was cited to "strengthen support for the sudden change in the line of succession" that removed bin Nayef from office.

This was the first assassination attempt against a royal family member since 2003, when Saudi Arabia faced a sharp uptick in Al Qaeda-linked attacks. The last assassination attempt against Prince Muhammad was in August 2010.

=== Deputy Crown Prince ===
On 23 January 2015, it was announced that King Salman had appointed Muhammad bin Nayef as deputy crown prince. The announcement reportedly helped calm fears of dynastic instability over the line of succession. Thus, Prince Muhammad became the first of his generation to be officially in line for the throne. In addition to his other posts, Prince Muhammad was named the chair of the Council for Political and Security Affairs which was established on 29 January 2015.

=== Crown Prince ===
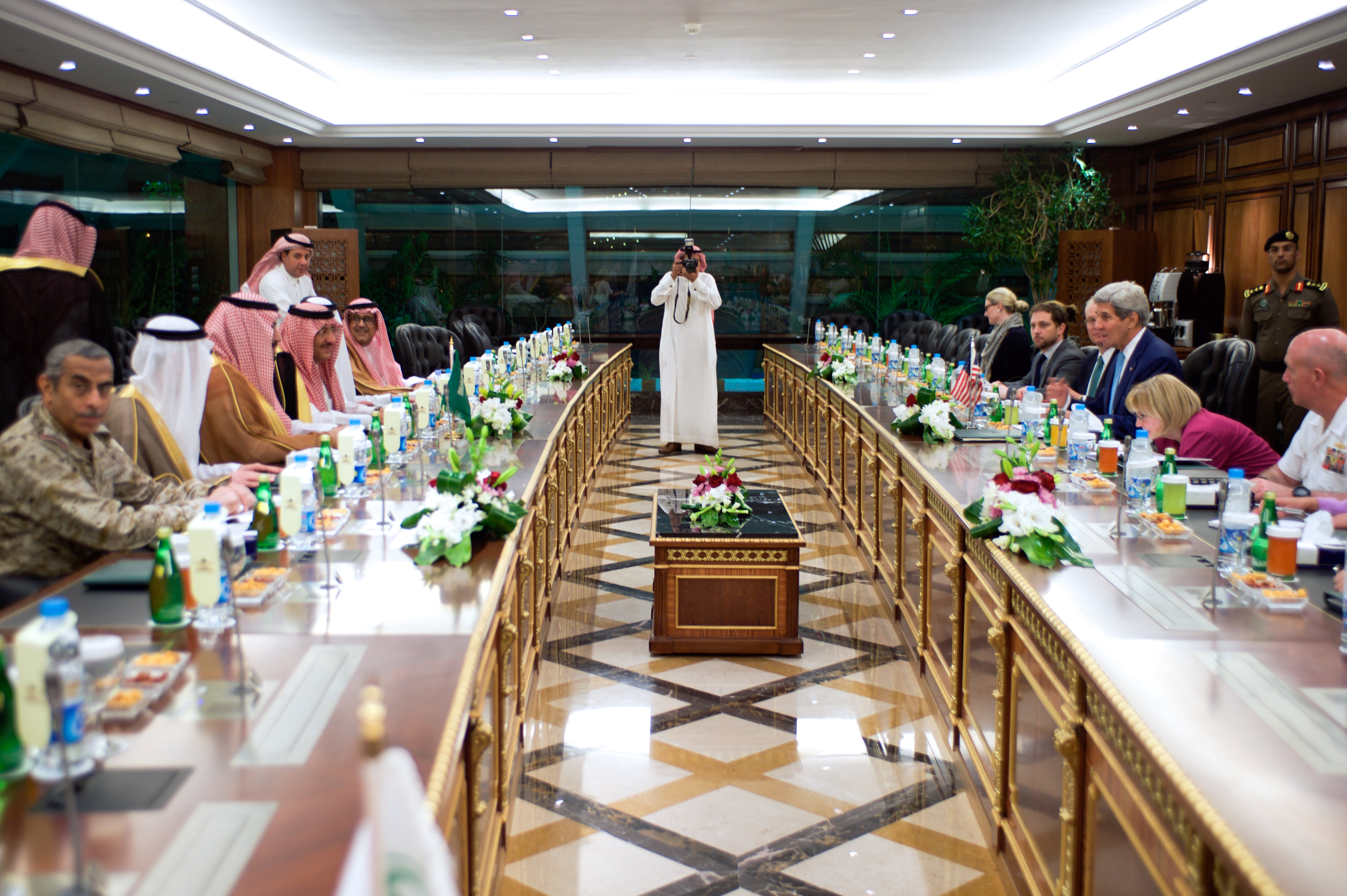
Crown Prince Muhammad with U.S. Secretary of State John Kerry, 6 May 2015

On 29 April 2015, Muhammad bin Nayef was named crown prince, replacing Muqrin bin Abdulaziz in the post. MBN's younger cousin, Mohammed bin Salman (MBS), was named deputy crown prince at age 29. The two princes frequently clashed, and MBS, known for his ambition, quickly consolidated influence within the royal court. MBS, as defense minister, launched and led the largely unsuccessful Saudi military campaign in Yemen in March 2015, while MBN's support for the war was muted.

By 2016, MBS's rise within the Saudi royal family raised speculation that he would displace MBN as heir apparent, and ultimately become king. Tensions between the two ratcheted up during the 2017 Qatar diplomatic crisis, in which MBS favored the regional blockade of Qatar, while MBN favored a diplomatic solution and sought (without MBS's knowledge) a backchannel for discussions with Qatari Emir Tamim bin Hamad al-Thani. MBS and MBN also jockeyed for influence with other Trump administration officials, such as Jared Kushner; their competition to gain the administration's favor was another major source of contention. Sheikh Mohamed bin Zayed Al Nahyan, the crown prince of Abu Dhabi, who had a poor relationship with MBN, supported MBS during the power struggle. Amid rising tensions, MBN's closest advisor, the intelligence official Saad Aljabri, fled to Turkey with his family.

== Ousted as crown prince in 2017 ==
Muhammad bin Nayef was deposed by royal decree on 21 June 2017, amid a palace coup that fundamentally reoriented the Saudi power structure. In his place, MBS, the king's son, was made crown prince and heir to the throne. Muhammad bin Nayef was also relieved of all positions by royal decree, losing his position as interior minister. Abdulaziz bin Saud Al Saud replaced Prince Muhammad as minister of interior. The change of succession had been predicted in December 2015 by an unusually blunt and public memo published by the German Federal Intelligence Service, for which it was subsequently rebuked by the German government.

During his ouster in late June 2017, Muhammad bin Nayef was reportedly detained and threatened for hours, and pressured to resign as crown prince and pledge fealty to Mohammed bin Salman, to whom other members of the Allegiance Council had already submitted. Muhammad bin Nayef ultimately gave a televised pledge of loyalty, reportedly at gunpoint. He was placed under house arrest at his palace in Jeddah. Muhammad bin Nayef was stripped of much of his wealth, with confiscations estimated at at least 4.75 billion USD (17.8 billion SAR). His bank accounts were blocked in late fall 2017. In December 2017, a letter under MBN's name was sent to HSBC in Geneva, asking the bank to transfer his funds to a Saudi account; HSBC, believing that MBN may have been under duress, declined to do so. Similar requests to transfer MBN's Europe-based assets were reportedly made in early 2021.

=== Arrest and detention in 2020 ===
Following his removal, Muhammad bin Nayef's wife and daughters were forbidden from leaving Saudi Arabia. MBN's house arrest was loosened in 2017, but he was not permitted to leave the kingdom. In 2018 and 2019, as MBS consolidated his power, MBN was permitted to hunt within Saudi Arabia and to attend weddings and funerals of royal family members. In March 2020, however, MBN was arrested at a private desert retreat outside Riyadh. The prince, his half-brother Nawwaf bin Nayef, and his uncle Ahmed bin Abdulaziz were all charged with treason, accused of conspiring against MBS.

Muhammad bin Nayef was reportedly held in solitary confinement for at least six months and was tortured, resulting in lasting physical injury. In August 2020, MBN's legal representatives raised concerns over his well-being, alleging that Saudi authorities had refused to allow his doctor or his family members to visit him since his arrest five months earlier. At some point in late 2020, Muhammad bin Nayef was moved to the Al Yamamah Palace complex in Riyadh, where he remained as of late 2022. According to a source cited by Guardian, "He is not allowed outside his small unit and he is filmed and recorded at all times.... He is not allowed visitors, except certain family members on rare occasions, nor can he see his personal doctor or legal representatives. He has been made to sign documents without reading them." In private discussions with Saudi authorities, the U.S. has urged the release of MBN, without success.

== Personal life ==
Muhammad bin Nayef is a son-in-law of Sultan bin Abdulaziz. His wife is Princess Reema bint Sultan Al Saud, and they have two daughters, Princess Sarah and Princess Lulua.

Muhammad bin Nayef has diabetes. Before his ouster from power in 2017, he frequently took long hunting and falconry vacations in Algeria, where he maintained a desert villa.

According to the Panama Papers, Muhammad bin Nayef purchased Panamanian companies from Mossack Fonseca.

=== Awards ===
In 2015, Muhammad bin Nayef was awarded the George Tenet medal by the CIA.

On 4 March 2016, when Muhammad bin Nayef was crown prince, he was awarded Légion d’honneur by then French president François Hollande citing his efforts in combating terrorism in the region.

== Notes ==
Footnotes

Saudi Arabian royalty
Preceded by Muqrin bin Abdulaziz	Crown Prince of Saudi Arabia; 28 April 2015 – 21 June 2017	Succeeded by Mohammed bin Salman
Political offices
Preceded by Ahmed bin Abdulaziz	Minister of the Interior; 5 November 2012 – 21 June 2017	Succeeded by Abdulaziz bin Saud
Preceded by Muqrin bin Abdulaziz	Second Deputy Prime Minister; 23 January 2015 – 28 April 2015	Succeeded by Mohammed bin Salman
Preceded by Muqrin bin Abdulaziz	First Deputy Prime Minister; 28 April 2015 – 21 June 2017	Succeeded by Mohammed bin Salman
