= Criticism of monarchy =

Criticism of the monarchical form of government or a specific monarchy

Criticism of monarchy is a form of objections against a hierarchy. It can be targeted against the general form of government, monarchy, or more specifically, to particular monarchical governments as controlled by hereditary royal families. In some cases, this criticism, also known as anti-monarchism, can be curtailed by legal restrictions and be considered criminal speech, as in lèse-majesté.

Monarchies in Europe and their underlying concepts, such as the Divine Right of Kings, became increasingly criticized during the Age of Enlightenment, which notably paved the way to the French Revolution and the proclamation of the abolition of the monarchy in France. Earlier, the American Revolution saw the Patriots suppress the Loyalists and expelled all royal officials.

In contemporary times, monarchies are present in the world in many forms with different degrees of royal power and involvement in civil affairs:

- Absolute monarchies in Brunei, Oman, Qatar, Saudi Arabia, Eswatini, the emirates of the UAE, and the Vatican City;
- Constitutional monarchies in the United Kingdom and its sovereign's Commonwealth Realms, and in Bahrain, Belgium, Denmark, Japan, Kuwait, Liechtenstein, Luxembourg, Malaysia, Monaco, Morocco, The Netherlands, Norway, Spain, Sweden, Thailand, Jordan, and the United Arab Emirates.

With the 1917 February Revolution in Russia and accelerated by two world wars, saw many European countries replace their monarchies with republics, while others replaced their absolute monarchies with constitutional monarchies. Reverse movements have also occurred, with brief returns of the monarchy in France under the Bourbon Restoration, the July Monarchy, and the Second French Empire, the Stuarts after the English Civil War and the Bourbons in Spain after the Franco dictatorship.

== Historical criticism ==
=== Antiquity ===
Aristotle published a critique of monarchy in the 4th-century BC as part of the Politics.

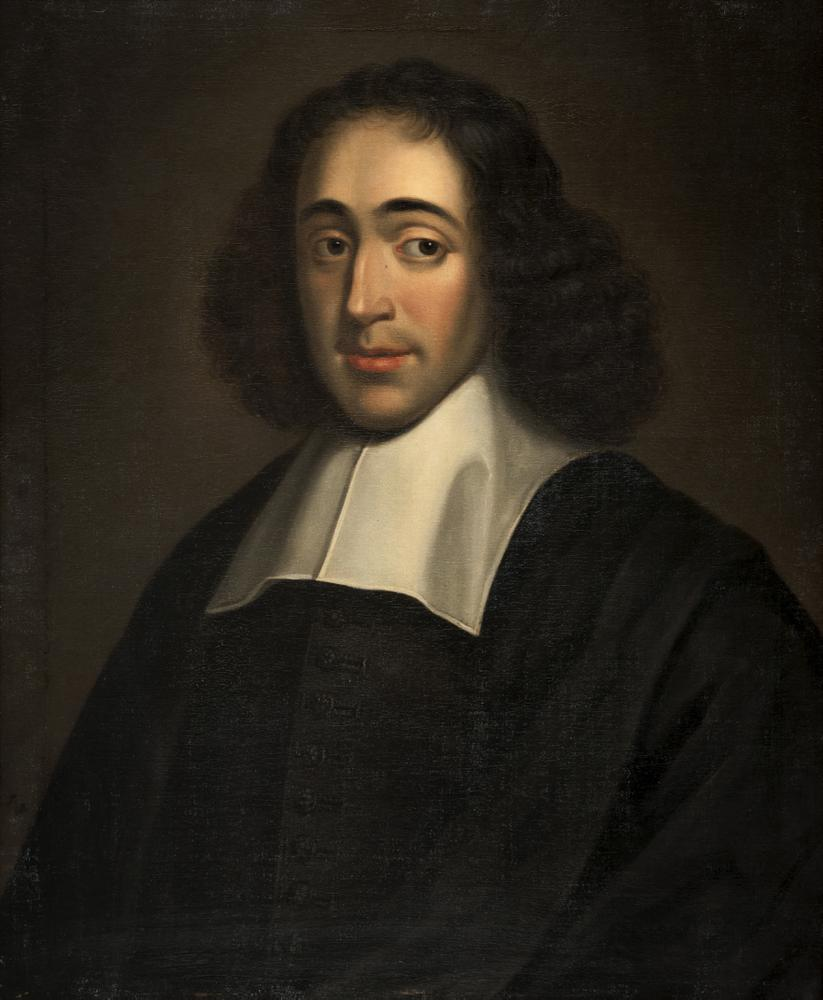
Baruch Spinoza was an early critic of monarchy during the Enlightenment.

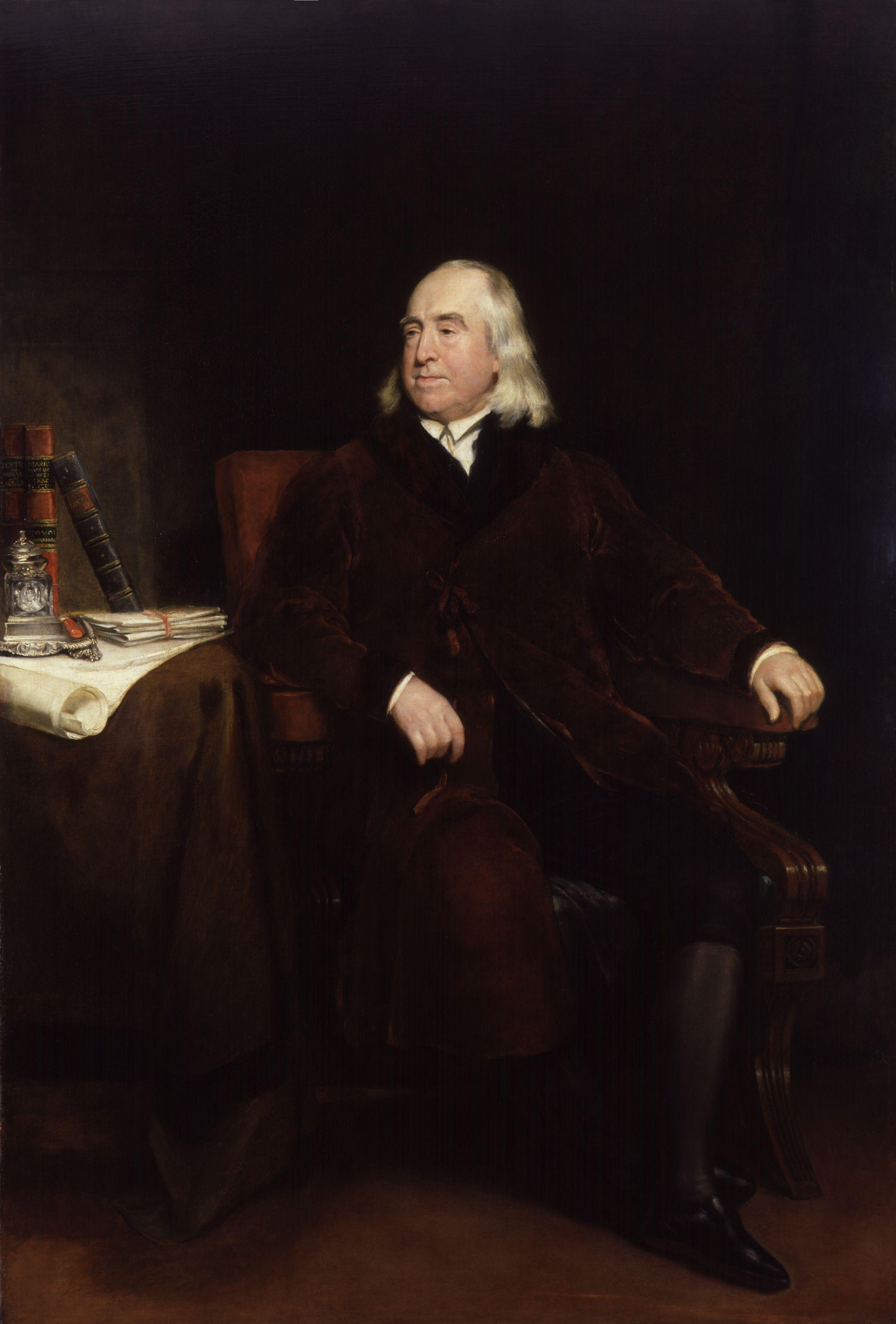
Jeremy Bentham viewed monarchy as an absurdity that had established itself through force of custom.

Aristotle taught that monarchy was only suitable for populations incapable of governing themselves, and believed that power ought to be shared within populations generally made up of equals. He also felt that it was easier to corrupt one individual than a multitude. Aristotle further criticized monarchies for passing down power through hereditary succession, which to him carried the undue risk of conferring power on someone incapable and bringing ruin to the nation.

=== Medieval ===
During the Middle Ages, the Dominican Bartholomew of Lucca, "presented republican government as the only suitable alternative for a virtuous people and identified monarchy with tyranny or despotism." Another medieval republican thinker was Marsilius of Padua who, influenced by Aristotle, advocated rule by the majority, and argued that "a ruler who is elected is greatly to be preferred to rulers who are hereditary."

During the Italian Renaissance, Niccolò Machiavelli, while largely viewed as an advisor of absolute rulers due to his widely read work The Prince, personally preferred republics and considered them to be superior to monarchies in several ways, including their ability to expand, and their ability to enjoy freedom from oppression.

During the reign of Henry VIII, Thomas Starkey's Dialogue between Cardinal Pole and Thomas Lupset, advocated that England embrace a republican form of government, asking "What is more repugnant to nature than a whole nation to be governed by the will of a Prince?" He argued that a community had the authority to both raise and depose its rulers through elections, writing that "this is in man's power, to elect and choose him that is both wise and just and make him a prince and him that is a tyrant so to depose." Starkey intended to present his work to the king, but never did so, and it was not published until the nineteenth century.

The establishment of a republican government under the Commonwealth of England inspired a number of English works attacking the institution of monarchy.

James Harrington espoused his republican ideals through The Commonwealth of Oceana in 1656. Harrington argued that the sovereignty must naturally follow economic influence, and that monarchy was the result of one man dominating ownership of land. He advocated the redistribution of property and an establishment of an assembly of landowners to be periodically replaced by elections. He warned that a failure to redistribute property would lead to a restoration of an oligarchic monarchy.

John Milton published a republican essay during this time, characterizing monarchy as "a government burdensome, expensive, useless and dangerous."

Algernon Sidney argued that monarchy was "founded upon human depravity." He attacked the French monarchy as corrupt and unpopular and held up republican Switzerland as one of the most peaceful and successful nations in Europe.

The Dutch-Jewish philosopher Baruch Spinoza held a preference for democratic over monarchical institutions. He believed all monarchies amounted to legal fictions because no single human being was capable in reality of holding and exercising all of the power implied by sovereignty.

Samuel Rutherford made his case in opposition to Royalists in Lex, Rex that "A power ethical, politic, or moral, to oppress, is not from God, and is not a power, but a licentious deviation of a power; and is no more from God, but from sinful nature and the old serpent." The publication of Lex, Rex earned Rutherford charges of treason against the king and subsequently the book was ordered to be burned. Rutherford was set to be executed on the basis of high treason but died of other causes before the execution proceeded. When confronted by defenders of the crown, Rutherford argued that once the basis of resistance to tyranny is denied, any argumentative legitimacy that monarchism should be considered a form of despotic government.

=== Modern ===
During the French Revolution there were public supporters of republicanism as early as 1790, but public opinion and the vast majority of the French deputies were still at that point in favor of monarchy. There was fear of uncertainty regarding abolishing the monarchy, and it was widely believed that getting rid of the king would produce political disorders such as anarchy or invasion. The subsequent temporary assumption of the executive by the Assembly in the wake of the Flight to Varennes did much to dissipate such fears. Condorcet began to publicly espouse republican views, and yet the majority of France and the deputies were still monarchist, until the perception that Louis XVI was aiding the enemies of France during the War of the First Coalition led to the abolition of the monarchy in September 1792, and the establishment of the French First Republic.

In 1804, as the government of France was moving towards declaring the nation an empire, Lazare Carnot made a case before the Tribunat in favor of retaining the republican system of government. He argued that there had been a decline in virtue and heroism in the Roman Empire as compared to the Roman Republic, and expressed skepticism that a monarchy would gain for France any advantages in the fields of domestic or foreign policy.

In the early nineteenth century, the English utilitarian philosopher Jeremy Bentham argued that "the only good act which a monarch was capable of accomplishing was to abolish his own office." Bentham viewed monarchy as an absurd institution which had established itself through force of custom, noting that "almost all men are born under it, all men are used to it, few men are used to anything else; till of late years nobody ever dispraised it."

The leading nineteenth century Italian statesman Giuseppe Mazzini who was also a prominent republican. Against Italian monarchists, he argued that a republic was more in line with Italian tradition.

In the early twentieth century, the British Liberal academic and statesman James Bryce contested the notion that monarchy tended to produce stable and capable rulers, arguing from historical example that most hereditary European monarchs for the previous five centuries had been mediocre.

=== Contemporary ===
The lower efficiency of hereditary monarchies on the coordination problem of government compared to democracy due to the advent of mass communication has been claimed as contributing to the decline of monarchies.

In the twenty-first century, numerous cases of popular opposition towards monarchy were present. In Nepal, the Communist Party of Nepal (Maoist Centre) has been historically and openly in opposition to the Royal House of Gorkha, referring to them as 'feudal forces', and engaging in open guerrilla warfare against the Nepalese government, culminating in the Nepalese Civil War. Eventually, a ceasefire would be reached with peace talks being made between the Maoist rebels and Nepal's interim legislature, leading to the Comprehensive Peace Accord.

Additionally, other cases of popular opposition to monarchy would occur in Malaysia, Cambodia, and the United Kingdom.

== Criticism of current monarchies ==
The selection of sovereigns generally does not involve democratic principles, such as in elective monarchy in states they head. For hereditary monarchies, royal power transmission is carried from generation to generation, with the title and associated power passing down to an heir. Several royal families are criticized in the world and their legitimacy challenged for example:

=== Bahrain ===
The Bahraini protests were initially aimed at achieving greater political freedom and equality for the majority Shia population, and expanded to a call to end the monarchy of Hamad bin Isa Al Khalifa following a deadly night raid on 17 February 2011 against protesters at the Pearl Roundabout in Manama, known locally as Bloody Thursday.

=== Belgium ===
A Belgian association, the Republican Circle, launched the petition "Abolition of Monarchy in Europe" to the attention of the European Parliament in March 2008, highlighting what they perceive as the incompatibility of the monarchy with several international declarations: Universal Declaration of Human Rights, International Covenant on Civil and Political Rights, and the Charter of Fundamental Rights of the European Union.

=== Canada ===
Debate between monarchists and republicans in Canada has been taking place since before the country's Confederation in 1867. Republican action has taken the form of protests on Victoria Day, the former Canadian sovereign's official birthday, lobbying of the federal and provincial governments to eliminate Canadian royal symbols, and legal action against the Crown, specifically in relation to the Oath of Citizenship and the Act of Settlement 1701. The debate has historically been stronger in the French-speaking province of Québec, in which a substantial sovereignty movement exists against both the federation of Canada and its monarchy.

=== Morocco ===
The legitimacy of King Mohammed VI was contested by some in the 20 February Movement of 2011 that attempted to challenge the monarchic system for the first time in the modern history of this country.

=== Netherlands ===
Criticism of the Netherlands monarchy has been on the rise in recent years, with notable shifts in public opinion and legal challenges aimed at reducing the king's powers. According to a survey, support for the monarchy as an institution has decreased, with a notable decline in the percentage of people in favor of the royal family. In 2020, 75% of respondents supported the monarchy, but this number dropped to 58% in the following year. There has also been a noticeable increase in the number of people expressing a desire for the Netherlands to transition into a republic, with almost a quarter of respondents favoring this change. In a significant legal development, Dutch activists have taken the king to court, aiming to demonstrate that his role in the legal system violates European human rights conventions. This legal action reflects a broader sentiment of criticism and a push for reduced royal powers. In addition, historical context shows that criticism of the monarchy and royalty has been present in Dutch society for decades, with notable debates and legal regulations surrounding the act of insulting the king.

=== Saudi Arabia ===
The Saudi government, which mandates Muslim and non-Muslim observance of Sharia law under the absolute rule of the House of Saud, has been denounced by international organizations and governments for violating human rights. The authoritarian regime is consistently ranked among the "worst of the worst" in Freedom House's annual survey of political and civil rights. According to Amnesty International, security forces torture and ill-treat detainees to extract confessions to be used as evidence against them. Saudi Arabia abstained from the UN vote adopting the Universal Declaration of Human Rights, saying it contradicted Sharia. Mass executions, such as those carried out in 2016 and 2019 and 2022 have been condemned by international rights groups.

=== Spain ===
The Spanish monarchy has faced significant criticism and scrutiny in recent years, with concerns spanning various aspects of its role and impact on Spanish society and politics. Issues such as the role of the monarchy in modern Spain, the conduct of past monarchs, and the relevance of a hereditary leadership system have been sources of debate and critique. A particular point of contention has been the conduct of former King Juan Carlos I, leading to public disillusionment and calls for reform. Additionally, the suitability of the monarchy in a modern, democratic society has been questioned, with discussions on the potential transition to a republic gaining traction. These criticisms have led to a deeper examination of the monarchy's place in Spanish governance and society, reflecting broader discussions on the country's political future.

=== Sweden ===
The debate over the monarchy's relevance in modern Sweden has been a recurring topic, with discussions on the role of the monarchy in a modern, egalitarian society. The question of whether Sweden should remain a monarchy was a central issue in a constitutional reform project that began in 1954, with the Social Democratic Party advocating for a republic and conservative parties supporting the monarchy. While the monarchy enjoys significant popular support, there are still calls for its abolition, reflecting a divide in public opinion. In addition, the monarchy's survival ultimately depends on the continuing support of the people, as it may seem contrary to democratic principles.

=== Thailand ===
Thailand's lèse-majesté law makes it an offense to defame, insult, or threaten members of the royal family. The law has caused a rise in discontent with the Thai monarchy and legislation. With penalties ranging from three to fifteen years imprisonment for each count, it has been described as the "world's harshest lèse majesté law" and "possibly the strictest criminal-defamation law anywhere". It is part of the criminal code section 112, but a violation can be reported by a Thai citizen against another Thai citizen. All alleged violations of the lèse-majesté law are investigated by the Thai police. False case reports take up Thai police officers' time, which leads to less focus on other serious criminal issues. False reports made by a citizen looking to hurt the reputation of another can also lead to incarceration if the accused is wrongfully found guilty. As the demographics of Thailand's population change, discontent with the monarchy continues to rise.

=== United Kingdom ===
The issue of the monarchy has been contentious within the United Kingdom and the countries that make up the union for hundreds of years. Arguments against the British monarchy include the institution's unaccountability, that appointing a head of state using the hereditary principle is undemocratic, unfair, elitist and should instead be decided by democratic elections, the monarchy's expense, the fact that the UK monarchy still holds royal prerogative which grants the Prime Minister powers such as the ability to declare war or sign treaties without a vote in Parliament, the Privy Council (a body of advisors to the monarch) being able to enact legislation without a vote in Parliament.

Britons' views on their monarchy change in response to the events involving its monarchs. After something positive happens, there is a rise in Britons viewing the importance of their monarchy as "very important"; conversely, fewer people rate the monarchy highly after something negative happens. Between 1994 and 2021, the percentage of the public who rated the British monarchy as "very important" ranged from 27% in 2006 to 46% in 2012. Between 1994 and 2021, 10–18% of the public rated the monarchy as "not at all important/abolish"; this percentage increased to 25% in 2021. In recent history, support for a monarchy has consistently been higher among older generations.

== See also ==
- Abolition of monarchy
- Anti-authoritarianism
- Democratization
- Republicanism

== Sources ==
- Blythe, J.M. (2019). "Ptolemy of Lucca". Encyclopedia of Medieval Philosophy. Dordrecht: Springer.
- Bryce, James (1921). Modern Democracies. Vol. 2. New York: The MacMillan Company.
- Costelloe, B.F.C.; Muirhead, J.H. (1897). Aristotle and the Earlier Peripatetics. Vol. 2.
- Dunning, William Archibald (1921a). A History of Political Theories: Ancient and Medieval.
- Dunning, William Archibald (1921b). A History of Political Theories: From Luther to Montesquieu.
- Durant, Will (1957). The Reformation.
- Durant, Will (1963). The Age of Louis XIV.
- Eccleshall, Robert (1978). Order and Reason in Politics: Theories of Absolute and Limited Monarchy in Early Modern England. Oxford University Press.
- Elton, Geoffrey Rudolph (2002). Studies in Tudor and Stuart politics and government. Cambridge University Press.
- Fisher, H.A.L. (1911). The Republican Tradition in Europe.
- Hazen, Charles (1919). Modern European History.
- Thiers, Adolphe (1893). History of the consulate and the empire of France under Napoleon. Vol. 3.
