= Arrest of Awad bin Mohammed Al-Qarni =

Saudi reformist law professor

Awad bin Mohammed Al-Qarniعوض بن محمد القرني
- Born: 1957 (age 68–69); Balqarn governorate, 'Asir Region, Saudi Arabia
- Occupations: Law professor at Imam Muhammad bin Saud Islamic University and King Khalid University
- Known for: Writing several books on Islamic jurisprudence and the Palestinian issue
- Criminal charges: Hostile actions against Saudi Arabia, owning a Twitter account, and using WhatsApp to share messages deemed "hostile" to the kingdom

Awad bin Mohammed Al-Qarni (born 1957) is a Saudi reformist law professor. In 2017, he was arrested and condemned to death for offenses including using a Twitter account and WhatsApp to share messages deemed "hostile" to the kingdom.

== Biography ==
Awad Al-Qarni was born in 1957 and raised in Balqarn governorate in Saudi Arabia's southwestern 'Asir Region. Al-Qarni was a professor at Imam Muhammad bin Saud Islamic University and King Khalid University, who focused on law and has written several books on Islamic jurisprudence and the Israeli–Palestinian conflict. According to the International Union of Muslim Scholars website, he was the head of the Saudi Arabian Union on neuro-linguistic programming.

== Background, arrest, and sentencing ==
In September 2017, Al-Qarni was arrested and charged with hostile actions against Saudi Arabia. According to The Guardian newspaper, Saudi-controlled media described Al-Qarni as a dangerous preacher, but the dissenters believed that he was an important intellectual on social media, including Twitter, with more than 2 million followers. Al-Qarni was arrested in 2007 and condemned to 15 years in jail in 2011 during a trial against the "Jeddah reformers".

On 15 January 2023, The Guardian reported that Al-Qarni faced the death penalty from the Saudi government for offenses including owning a Twitter account and using WhatsApp to share messages deemed "hostile" to the kingdom. The details of the news were revealed by his son Nasser al-Qarni in a video, who left Saudi Arabia last year and is living in the UK. Nasser also said he withdrew from the Gulf Kingdom under the threat of imprisonment or execution by the Saudi authorities if he spoke about his father.

== Criticisms and reactions ==
The United States government has accused Saudi Arabia of using big technology companies and social media platforms such as Twitter and WhatsApp to suppress its critics. Saudi Arabia's sovereign wealth fund the Public Investment Fund from 2018 to 2022 raised their stake in US social media platforms Twitter and Meta Platforms, the company that owns Facebook and WhatsApp.

Jeed Basyouni, the head of Middle East and North African advocacy at Reprieve, said that the kingdom has sought to present an international image of investment in technology, modern infrastructure, sports, and entertainment through posting about the kingdom's investment on Facebook and Twitter, while that scholars and academics, including Al-Qarni, are facing the death penalty by the government of Bin Salman for tweeting and expressing their opinions.

Khalid Aljabri, son of Saad bin Khalid Al Jabri said: It's more than abhorrent that a prominent law professor faces the death penalty for using Twitter while an FBI fugitive is wanted for allegedly selling the personal information of Saudi dissidents to the Saudi government by breaking into Twitter's headquarters (Ahmad Al-Mutairi), acquires a Netflix-sponsored VIP invitation to attend a Saudi government event.

== See also ==
- 2016 Saudi Arabia mass execution
- Human rights in Saudi Arabia
- 2018 Women's Rights Crackdown
- Dina Ali Lasloom – imprisoned Saudi asylum seeker
- Fahad al-Butairi – abducted in Jordan and taken to be imprisoned in Saudi Arabia
- Hamza Kashgari – pro-democracy activist and columnist imprisoned for blasphemy
- Israa al-Ghomgham – Saudi Qatif conflict human rights activist
- Loujain al-Hathloul – Saudi women's rights activist
- Manal al-Sharif – Saudi human rights activist
- Mishaal bint Fahd bin Mohammed Al Saud – Saudi princess executed for alleged adultery
- Princesses Jawaher, Sahar, Hala and Maha – Saudi princesses under house arrest
- Raif Badawi – imprisoned Saudi dissident, writer and activist
- Samar Badawi – imprisoned Saudi activist
- Sheikh Baqir al-Nimr – dissident cleric executed for starting riots in Qatif
- Justice Against Sponsors of Terrorism Act
- Lists of solved missing person cases
- Saudi Arabian involvement in the Syrian Civil War
- Saudi Arabian-led intervention in Yemen
