= Execution of Nimr al-Nimr =

2016 execution of a Shia cleric and others in Saudi Arabia

Execution of Nimr Al Nimr
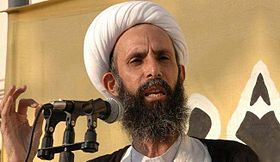
- Nimr Baqir Al-Nimr
- Date: 2 January 2016; 10 years ago
- Venue: Riyadh, Kingdom of Saudi Arabia

Nimr Baqir al-Nimr was a Shia cleric and critic of the government in Saudi Arabia, who was beheaded on 2 January 2016, one of 47 people executed that day for terrorism offenses. Others executed included Sunnis who had been convicted of involvement in terror attacks linked to al-Qaeda which took place in 2003. News of the killings triggered international demonstrations, and condemnation by nations, supranational organizations, and human rights groups.

== Execution ==
In October 2014, Saudi Arabia's Supreme Court approved a death sentence for Nimr for disobeying the ruler, inciting sectarian strife, and encouraging, leading and participating in demonstrations. According to sources, the main charge was his criticism of Saudi's officials. On 2 January 2016, the Saudi Arabia government executed 47 prisoners and declared that Nimr had been among them.

== Street protests ==
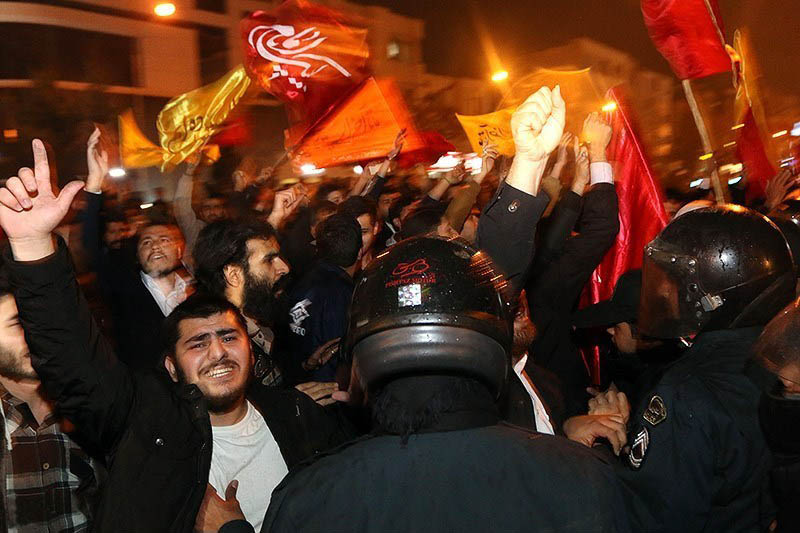
Protest in Mashhad in front of the Saudi consulate.

Protests were held after Nimr's execution in many cities of the world such as London, Tehran, Chicago, Toronto, Iranian holy cities of Qom and Mashhad, Iraq, Lebanon, Afghanistan, Pakistan, India's Jammu and Kashmir state, Turkey, and in front of the Saudi Embassy in Athens, Greece Washington, United States, and Canberra, Australia.

People in the Qatif region of Saudi Arabia's Eastern Province took to the streets with protesters marching from Nimr's hometown of al-Awamiyah to Qatif, chanting: "Down with the Al Saud".

On 2 January, the day of the execution, protesters gathered outside Tehran's Saudi embassy, shouting "death to Al Saud". The embassy was on fire after a Molotov cocktail had been thrown at it. The protests continued beyond 3 am. The embassy was empty during the protests. Police donned riot gear and arrested 40 people during the incident. The Iranian Foreign Ministry has appealed for calm and to respect diplomatic premises. The day after, protests were held again by hundreds of Iranians in Tehran, and President Rouhani called the damage on the embassy "by no means justifiable". Elsewhere, there were protests in the Iranian holy city of Qom.

Hundreds of people held a protest rally in the Bahraini capital, Manama. Demonstrators carrying pictures of Sheikh Nimr were involved in a clash with police in the Bahraini village of Abu-Saiba. Hundreds also marched in al-Daih and Sitra, chanting slogans against Saudi Arabia's ruling Al Saud family and the Sunni family ruling Bahrain, and calling Nimr "our martyr".

In Iraq, protestors broke into the Saudi embassy, which has not been officially opened yet. Footage of a rocket attack on the Saudi embassy in Baghdad also was released by the media.

In the Indian city of Srinagar, the capital of the state of Jammu and Kashmir, people protested using anti-Saudi banners. The protesters were marching towards the UN office at Sonawar, only to be intercepted by the police. Similar protests were held in the Kargil district, where religious organisations called for three days of mourning.

=== Subsequent events ===
On 5 January 2016 a Candlelight vigil was held in Ladakh by Buddhist, Christian and Muslim (Shia & Sunni) communities of Leh and Kargil to demonstrate their solidarity with human rights and voice against Nimr's execution, a local kashmir journalist Raqib Hameed Naik reported.

Boustan Street in Tehran was renamed Nimr Baqir al-Nimr Street soon after the execution.

== Reactions of religious and political figures ==
=== Involved parties ===
- Saudi Arabia
  - Nimr's brother, Mohammed al-Nimr, said that the pro-democracy movement in Saudi Arabia would only be strengthened after this execution. He described his brother as "a humble, religious man who lived a simple life, making him attractive to many youths", and that his execution "will spark anger of (Shia) youths", and said he hoped any response would be peaceful.
  - Saudi Arabia broke off diplomatic relations with Iran.

=== Supranational bodies ===
- United Nations
  - UN Secretary-General Ban Ki-moon voiced his dismay over the execution of Nimr. Statements also revealed that the Secretary-General had raised Nimr's case with the leadership of the Kingdom of Saudi Arabia on a number of occasions. Ban Ki-Moon also called the Saudi breaking of diplomatic ties with Iran "deeply worrying".
  - The United Nations High Commissioner for Human Rights Zeid Ra'ad al-Hussein decried Nimr's killing as a "disturbing development", since he had not committed a crime that belonged to the category of "most serious crimes" under international law, adding that the death penalty could only be handed down with stringent respect of due process and fair trial guarantees, and full transparency throughout the process.
- European Union
  - High Representative of the Union for Foreign Affairs and Security Policy Federica Mogherini condemned the execution, stating that Nimr's death raises serious concerns regarding freedom of expression and the respect of basic civil and political rights".

=== In other countries ===
- Australia
  - Julie Bishop, Australia's Minister for Foreign Affairs, said the Australian government was "deeply disturbed by the recent executions".
- Bahrain
  - The Bahraini government backed the execution.
  - Bahrain also broke off diplomatic relations with Iran.
- Canada
  - Canada denounced the execution.
- China
  - Chinese Foreign Ministry spokeswoman Hua Chunying, while referring to Saudi breaking of diplomatic ties with Iran, said China is "highly concerned about the developments and expresses concern that the relevant event may intensify conflict in the region".
- Egypt
  - The Egyptian Foreign Ministry spokesman said Egypt condemned attacks against the Saudi embassy in Tehran and the Saudi consulate in Mashhad in Iran.
  - Deputy Foreign Minister Hamdi Loza condemned "threats" against Saudi Arabia for enforcing its domestic law on a Saudi citizen to defend national security.
  - The Egyptian Foreign Ministry spokesman said that Egypt will stand with Saudi Arabia against Iranian meddling with Riyadh and other Arab countries' domestic affairs, he added that diplomatic relations will continue to be severed with Iran "for well-known reasons."
- France
  - The French foreign ministry said it "deeply deplores" the Saudi executions, and urged regional leaders to take all measures to avoid an escalation in sectarian tensions.
- Germany
  - A German foreign ministry spokesman told AFP: "The execution of (imam) Nimr Baqr al-Nimr reinforces our current concerns about the growing tension ... in the region", saying the death penalty was "an inhumane punishment that we reject in all circumstances".
- Iran
  - Supreme Leader Ali Khamenei tweeted that "[a]wakening is not suppressible", and compared the Saudi government to the ISIL, also infamous for its mass executions. Khamenei's website carried a picture of a Saudi executioner next to notorious Islamic State executioner Jihadi John, with the caption "Any differences?" He warned the Saudi government that they will encounter "divine vengeance" for this execution. On a speech a day after the execution, he said the religious leader "neither invited people to take up arms nor hatched covert plots. The only thing he did was public criticism".
  - President Hassan Rouhani called Saudi Arabia's "non-Islamic and inhuman" execution of al-Nimr in line with Riyadh's sectarian policies that aim to spread terrorism and extremism, saying the execution violates "human rights and Islamic values".
  - Iranian Foreign Ministry summoned the Saudi Arabian chargé d'affaires. Foreign Ministry Spokesman Hossein Jaberi Ansari said the execution of Sheikh Nimr "who had no means other than speech to pursue his political and religious objectives only shows the depth of imprudence and irresponsibility". He said that the Saudi government "supports terrorist movements and extremists, but confronts domestic critics with oppression and execution". Foreign Minister Mohammad Javad Zarif also condemned the execution.
  - The Islamic Revolutionary Guard Corps (IRGC) condemned the execution, comparing the attitude and actions to those of ISIL. IRGC said "harsh revenge" would topple "this pro-terrorist, anti-Islamic regime". Saudi Arabia summoned the Iranian ambassador in response.
  - Both high-ranking Shia and Sunni clerics of Iran condemned the execution. Shia marja Naser Makarem Shirazi called it "deeply shocking" and called the Saudi government "the center for spreading sedition and Takfiri ideology". Grand Ayatollah Lotfollah Safi-Golpaygani said the execution "once again showed the criminal nature" of the Al Saud regime and that it paves the way for the regime's fall. Grand Ayatollah Hossein Noori Hamedani urged all Shia and Sunni Muslims to react against the incident. Ayatollah Ahmad Khatami, a member of the Assembly of Experts and Friday prayer Imam, predicted the fall of Saudi Arabia's ruling family following the execution. Ayatollah Abbas Kaabi, Seyed Mohammad Vaez Mousavi and Ayatollah Hassan Mamdouhi also condemned the executions, underlining that "Saudis has dug its own grave". Ayatollah Hosseini Bushehri, the head of Qom Seminary Schools, announced that large number of clerics and seminary school students of Qom will close their teachings sessions on Sunday. Sunni clerics, including the representative of Iran's Sunni-populated Southeastern province of Sistan and Baluchestan at the Assembly of Experts, Chairman of the Sunni Lawmakers' Fraction at the Iranian parliament Abed Fattahi, Molawi Abdolhamid Ismailzehi (the Friday prayers leader of Iran's Southeastern city of Zahedan) also condemned the execution. Iranian seminaries held a protest rally in front of the Saudi embassy in Tehran and condemned execution of the Shiite cleric by chanting "death to Al Saud". A group of Iranian clerics and seminary students have also held demonstrations in Qom and Mashhad the day after.
  - Locals in Tehran gathered outside the Saudi diplomatic mission to protest the execution. Crowds attacked Saudi Arabia's embassy in Tehran, throwing stones and Molotov cocktails, which set off a fire, while chanting "death to Al Saud". Police donned riot gear and arrested 40 people during the incident. The Iranian Foreign Ministry has appealed for calm and to respect diplomatic premises, The day after, protests were held again by hundreds of Iranians in Tehran, and President Rouhani called the damage on embassy "by no means justifiable".
- Iraq
  - Iraqi Prime Minister Haider al-Abadi said the execution would have repercussions on regional security.
  - The Islamic Supreme Council of Iraq, a Shia political party, and several Iraqi Shia MPs condemned the execution.
  - Former Prime Minister of Iraq Nouri al-Maliki said that his countrymen "strongly condemn these detestable sectarian practices" and said that this "crime" will be the downfall of the Saudi government, just as "the crime of executing the martyr al-Sadr did to Saddam".
  - In Iraq, prominent religious and political figures demanded that Iraqi-Saudi ties be severed.
  - Grand Ayatollah Ali al-Sistani called the execution an "aggression".
  - The board of Fatwas of Iraqi Sunnis condemned the execution in a statement, adding that Saudi Arabia should account for "igniting the fire of new discord in the Muslim world".
- Lebanon
  - Hezbollah
    - Hezbollah said the execution amounted to assassination, describing Sheikh Nimr as a spiritual scholar who always sought dialogue and resisted injustice.
    - Hassan Nasrallah said in a televised address the execution will not be taken lightly, calling the House of Saud "the main source and the launching pad for Takfiri ideology".
  - Lebanon's Supreme Islamic Shia Council called the execution of al-Nimr "an execution of reason, moderation and dialogue" and a "grave mistake".
  - Peaceful protests occurred.
- Pakistan
  - Pakistan's Muslims Unity Assembly decried the execution as a challenge against millions of Muslims worldwide.
  - Peaceful protests occurred.
- Palestine
  - Popular Front for the Liberation of Palestine (PFLP) condemned the execution, saying that the Saudi government "insists on pouring oil to the flames of sectarian sedition".
- Philippines
  - The Philippines' Department of Foreign Affairs called on all parties "to work together to ease sectarian tensions and to promote reconciliation". They also called "for full respect for the inviolability of diplomatic premises in all nations".
- Russia
  - Russia said cutting off diplomatic relations is not a "very constructive step". The Russian Foreign Ministry said Russia is ready to mediate the dispute between Iran and Saudi Arabia in order to restore ties.
- Sudan
  - Sudan joined Saudi Arabia and broke off diplomatic relations with Iran.
- Turkey
  - Peaceful protests occurred. Turkish President Recep Tayyip Erdoğan said that Nimr's execution was an "internal legal matter" for Saudi Arabia.
- United Kingdom
  - Britain's Shadow Foreign Secretary, Hilary Benn, described the execution as "profoundly wrong", and condemned the act of execution in general.
  - The Liberal Democrats leader, Tim Farron, stated: "I utterly condemn Saudi Arabia for the execution of 47 people including the prominent Shia cleric Sheikh Nimr al-Nimr. Capital punishment is utterly abhorrent and the prime minister needs to turn round to our 'ally' and tell them capital punishment is wrong. Britain must live our values and criticise nations like Saudi Arabia that continue this heinous and barbarous punishment."
- United States
  - United States Department of State spokesman John Kirby called on Saudi Arabia to respect human rights and permit peaceful dissent.
  - An anonymous official talking to The Washington Post said: "There are larger repercussions than just the reaction to these executions," including damage to "counter-ISIL initiatives as well as the Syrian peace process".
- Yemen
  - Ansarullah movement (the Houthis) described Sheikh Nimr as a "holy warrior" and called the Saudi execution a "flagrant violation of human rights".

=== NGOs ===
- Human Rights Watch said the executions "further stain Saudi Arabia's troubling human rights record". Sarah Leah Whitson, the group's Middle East director, said Nimr was convicted in an unfair trial and that his execution was "only adding to the existing sectarian discord and unrest".
- Amnesty International called Sheikh Nimr's trial political, grossly unfair, and stated that the execution was to settle political scores.
- Ian Bremmer, the president of Eurasia Group, told Business Insider that "Saudi Arabia is in serious trouble and they know it", concluding that by cutting diplomatic ties with Iran, Saudi Arabia "wants to make regional tensions an Iran story, which helps them domestically".

== See also ==
- 2016 Saudi Arabia mass execution
- 2019 Saudi Arabia mass execution
- Iran–Saudi Arabia proxy conflict
