= Anthony Ferrante =

Anthony Ferrante may refer to:

- Anthony C. Ferrante, American film director, producer, and writer,
- Anthony J. Ferrante, American cybersecurity professional and government official

== See also ==
- Tony Ferrante Jr. (born 1964), American stock car racing driver
