= Ali Mohammed Baqir al-Nimr =

Saudi Arabian former political prisoner

Ali Mohammed Baqir al-Nimr علي محمد باقر النمر
- Born: 20 December 1994 (age 31); Al-Awamiyah, Saudi Arabia
- Status: Released on 27 October 2021
- Known for: Being a political prisoner in Saudi Arabia
- Convictions: Participation in anti-government demonstrations; Having a weapon and using violence
- Penalty: Death; commuted to 9 years and 8 months in prison

Details
- Date apprehended: 14 February 2012

Ali Mohammed Baqir al-Nimr (Arabic: علي محمد باقر النمر; born 20 December 1994) is a Saudi Arabian former political prisoner who participated in the 2011–12 Saudi Arabian protests during the Arab Spring as a teenager. He was arrested in February 2012 and sentenced to death by beheading and crucifixion in May 2014, having previously awaited ratification of his sentence by King Salman of Saudi Arabia. Ali's trial was considered unfair by Professor of Human Rights Law Christof Heyns, and Amnesty International, as well as French President François Hollande and Prime Minister Manuel Valls, who called for the execution to be stopped.

Ali is a nephew of Sheikh Nimr Baqr al-Nimr, who was one of the 47 executed citizens during the 2016 Saudi Arabian mass execution. Ali's death sentence was overturned in April 2020, following several announcements from the Saudi government that people convicted as minors under 18 years of age were not to be executed and he was finally released from prison on 27 October 2021.

== Background, arrest, and sentencing ==
Ali participated in the 2011–12 Saudi Arabian protests during the Arab Spring. According to a court judgment, he "encouraged pro-democracy protests using a BlackBerry smartphone". He was arrested on 14 February 2012. According to his father, the arrest was carried out by secret police ramming into his son with their vehicle on a moonless night, resulting in multiple fractures and other injuries. Ali was hospitalised for several days. He was detained at a General Directorate of Investigations (GDI) prison in Dammam. He stated that he was repeatedly and severely tortured during his detention.

On 27 May 2014, Ali was sentenced to death on charges of participation in anti-government demonstrations, having a weapon and using violence. His appeals to the Saudi Arabian Specialized Criminal Court and Supreme Court were rejected.

Before April 2020, Ali was awaiting ratification by King Salman, after which his sentence of crucifixion and beheading would be carried out. Dawoud al-Marhoon, who had also been arrested as a 17-year-old in 2012 during the Eastern Province protests, was also sentenced to death by beheading in early October 2015. He was tortured during his detention and was convicted on the basis of a forced confession. As of 2020, Ali was still on death row, although the Saudi government has announced that the death penalty will no longer be applied to people convicted as minors, thus tentatively overturning his death sentence.

== Subsequent events and tentative pardon ==
Amnesty International said that the trial was unfair, describing it as "deeply flawed." They claimed refusal by authorities to allow al-Nimr regular access to his lawyer, refusal to allow him pen and paper, refusal to allow his lawyer to cross-examine witnesses, and the failure of authorities to inform al-Nimr's lawyer about the dates of several court hearings. Al-Nimr's appeal was heard in secret.

In September 2015, supporters in the United Kingdom, including Leader of the Opposition Jeremy Corbyn, put pressure on the UK government to ask Saudi authorities to stop the execution. Christof Heyns, the United Nations Special Rapporteur on extrajudicial, summary or arbitrary executions, and Benyam Mezmur, the chair of the United Nations (UN) Committee on the Rights of the Child, together with other UN human rights experts, also called on the Saudi government to stop the execution and called for al-Nimr to be given a fair trial. On 23 and 24 September, French President François Hollande and Prime Minister Manuel Valls requested Saudi authorities to cancel the execution sentence.

On 27 September 2015, Anonymous claimed to have disabled several Saudi Arabian governmental websites for a few hours in protest against the death sentence, stating that: "Anonymous will not stand by and watch. We cannot and will not allow this to happen." As of 2 October 2015, a petition launched by Avaaz calling for the sentence to be cancelled had gathered more than a million signatures in less than 24 hours.

In April 2020, Crown Prince Mohammed bin Salman announced that the death penalty shall no longer be applied to people who were convicted as minors under 18 years of age, and will instead be replaced with placement in a juvenile detention facility for a period not exceeding 10 years at the maximum, thus tentatively overturning Ali al-Nimr's death sentence.

== Personal life ==
Ali was born in Al-Awamiyah. He attended Altarfih al-Sahil High School and completed his high school education in prison. He also enjoys and played football and is a fan of AC Milan. He has an older brother and an older sister. Ali al-Nimr is a nephew of Sheikh Nimr Baqr al-Nimr, an independent Shia Sheikh who was popular among the youth and a prominent critic of the Saudi Arabian government. Sheikh Nimr was arrested on 8 July 2012, sentenced to death by the Specialized Criminal Court on 15 October 2014 for anti-government activities, and executed on or shortly before 2 January 2016. Ali al-Nimr's family believes that this relationship is the reason for his arrest and sentencing.

== See also ==
- Israa al-Ghomgham – Eastern Province human rights activist tentatively sentenced to death in August 2018
- Human rights in Saudi Arabia
