= Hussein Abu al-Khair =

High profile death row prisoner in Saudi Arabia

Hussein Abu al-Khair (Arabic: حسين أبو الخير; c. 1965 – 12 March 2023) was a Jordanian citizen who was imprisoned and subsequently executed in Saudi Arabia after being convicted of drug smuggling using a confession allegedly obtained under torture. Al-Khair's trial and execution were criticised by human rights organisations.

== Personal life ==
Al-Khair was a father of eight and was working as a driver for a Saudi citizen at the time of his arrest. Prior to his work in Saudi Arabia, he had worked as a fruit vendor, and was described as coming from a "poor family".

== Arrest and trial ==
On 18 May 2014, al-Khair was arrested at the border between Aqaba Governorate, Jordan, and Tabuk Province, Saudi Arabia after Saudi border guards reported finding 200, 000 Captagon pills hidden in his vehicle's fuel tank. Al-Khair went on to confess the crime, following what his sister described as twelve days of torture, including being suspended upside down by his ankles and being hit with sticks. During his trial, al-Khair recanted his confession, stating it was "the words of the investigator". In January 2015, a judge upheld al-Khair's original confession, and sentenced him to death.

In March 2017, an appeal court removed al-Khair's guilty verdict; in November 2017, following a retrial ordered by the Saudi government, al-Khair was once again found guilty and sentenced to death.

== Imprisonment ==
During his sentence, al-Khair was imprisoned at a prison in Tabuk.

Amnesty International called al-Khair's trial "grossly unfair", and the United Nations' Working Group on Arbitrary Detention found his imprisonment to be arbitrary and without legal basis; both called for his imminent release. In November 2022, the UN's High Commissioner for Human Rights called on the Saudi government to release al-Khair.

In December 2022, David Rutley told the British parliament that the Saudi government had "clearly" tortured al-Khair. The following week, Rutley requested that his words be struck from the Hansard, the official transcripts of British parliamentary sessions, saying that he had spoken in "error" when he called al-Khair's treatment "abhorrent". The anti-death penalty organisation Reprieve called the government "spineless" for recanting its criticism of the Saudi government; while David Davis, the MP who had raised al-Khair's pending execution in the session, said "nobody of any sense denies the Saudis torture people". Davis had previously described the accusation that al-Khair was a drugpin as being "absurd", calling him an "impoverished father of eight [who] had neither the money nor connections to buy large quantities of drugs in Jordan to sell in Saudi Arabia".

In November 2022, al-Khair's family said that he had told them he had been moved to an area of the prison reserved for prisoners awaiting imminent execution. Al-Khair's resentencing was widely criticsed as contrary to Saudi law; among other issues, a judge who had previously sentenced al-Khair to death also sat as a judge in the retrial.

== Execution ==
Al-Khair was executed in Tabuk on 12 March 2023, exactly one year after the 2022 Saudi Arabia mass execution, at the age of 57. The execution occurred just a day after British politician Tariq Ahmad of the Foreign, Commonwealth and Development Office reported having raised al-Khair's case on a ministerial level with Saudi officials. The method of al-Khair's execution has not been publicly recorded, though the Saudi government did release a statement confirming al-Khair's execution, and stressing "the keenness of the Kingdom's government to combat drugs of all kinds because of the severe harm they cause to the individual and society".

Al-Khair's family have reported that they were not notified of his impending execution and were not permitted to speak to him before his death.

=== International reaction ===
Al-Khair's execution was criticised by human rights organisations, including Human Rights Watch and Amnesty International. David Davis criticised James Cleverly, the British Foreign Secretary, for not explicitly calling for a halt to al-Khair's execution, as had been done by his predecessors.

In the United Kingdom, Foreign Office minister Leo Docherty was criticised after telling Parliament that al-Khair's execution did not breach Saudi Arabia's "freeze" of the death penalty after Crown Prince Mohammed bin Salman stated that only "violent" criminals would be executed. Reprieve called Docherty's comments "misleading" and accused the British government of "cosying up" with the Saudi regime.
