= Nimr Baqir al-Nimr Street =

Nimr Baqir al-Nimr Street (formerly Boustan Street) is a street in Tehran, Iran which connects to Pasdaran Avenue. It is adjacent to the Saudi embassy and some lower-key diplomatic missions. Other buildings include the Rassam Arab-zadeh Carpet (فرش) Museum and Museum of Contemporary Arts and Crafts. In January 2016, some Iranians who protested the execution of Nimr al-Nimr erected street signs bearing the name "Nimr Street" in an effort to encapsulate that name change. Within days Iran Daily reported approval by the Tehran Islamic City Council to rename the street Nimr Baqir al-Nimr Street.

== See also ==
- Ferdowsi Street
- Shahnaz street
