= Anthony J. Ferrante =

American cybersecurity expert

- Education: Fordham University (BS, MS)
- Occupation: Cybersecurity expert
- Years active: 2005–present
- Organization: FTI Consulting
- Known for: Cybersecurity, Investigations
- Notable work: Investigation of Jeff Bezos phone hacking incident 2016 U.S. election cyber investigations

Anthony J. Ferrante is an American cybersecurity professional and former government official. He served in senior cybersecurity roles at the Federal Bureau of Investigation (FBI) and the White House National Security Council (NSC) before entering the private sector. Ferrante currently serves as Global Head of Cybersecurity at FTI Consulting.

In 2016, Ferrante coordinated the federal response to Russian cyber operations targeting the United States presidential election. Working within the FBI's Cyber Division, he collaborated with federal, state, and local officials to assess threats and strengthen election infrastructure security protocols.

== Education ==
Anthony J. Ferrante earned his bachelor's degree in Computer Science from Fordham University in New York City, in 2001. He subsequently completed a master's degree in Computer Science at the same institution in 2004.

As an alumnus and later an adjunct professor, Ferrante helped establish Fordham University's International Conference on Cyber Security. He also contributed to the development of the university's master's degree in cybersecurity program at the Graduate School of Arts and Sciences, as well as served as co-director of the cybersecurity research program.

In 2021, Ferrante became a member of the executive committee of the Fordham President's Council.

== Career ==
=== FBI (2005–2015) ===
In 2005, Ferrante began his career with the Federal Bureau of Investigation as a special agent assigned to the FBI's New York Field Office. In 2006, he was selected to join the FBI's Cyber Action Team, a rapid-response unit tasked to investigate critical cyber incidents across countries on behalf of the U.S. government. Throughout his tenure at the FBI, Ferrante advanced within the cyber division, eventually serving as Chief of Staff of the FBI Cyber Division at FBI Headquarters in Washington.

Ferrante also fostered collaborations between law enforcement and academia. In 2009 he helped Fordham University to launch the International Conference on Cyber Security (ICCS), a recurring conference co-sponsored by the FBI that convenes cybersecurity researchers, law enforcement officials, and professionals from organizations such as IBM, Microsoft, and Google.

=== National Security Council (2015–2017) ===
From 2015 to 2017, Ferrante served on the White House National Security Council (NSC) as the Director for Cyber Incident Response during the term of Barrack Obama and briefly during the early administration of Donald Trump. In this role, he oversaw the development of national cyber policy and incident response protocols.

In 2016, Ferrante supervised an inquiry into allegations of Russian interference in the 2016 US elections. He left the NSC in 2017 as the administration changed, transitioning to a management role in the private sector.

=== FTI Consulting (2017–Present) ===
In 2017, Ferrante joined FTI Consulting as a Senior Managing Director. He was tasked with developing and enhancing the firm's cybersecurity consulting practice and was later appointed the Global Head of Cybersecurity at FTI. In this position, Ferrante manages a team of professionals that provide advisory services, cyber risk management, digital forensics, and incident response. FTI's cybersecurity segment has expanded across different countries, recruiting former law enforcement and intelligence experts to its ranks.

In 2018–2019, he oversaw a digital forensics investigation into the hack of Amazon founder Jeff Bezos's smartphone. That investigation, conducted by FTI at Bezos's request, concluded with medium to high confidence that the breach was carried out via a WhatsApp message from a phone number used by Saudi Arabia's Crown Prince Mohammed bin Salman. Ferrante's team produced a detailed forensic report linking the malware on Bezos's phone to the Saudi account.

Ferrante was also involved in an inquiry related to the Steele dossier allegations. In 2017, after the news organization BuzzFeed published the dossier concerning alleged Russian interference in the 2016 U.S. election, Russian technology entrepreneur Aleksej Gubarev filed a defamation lawsuit against the publication. BuzzFeed's legal team retained Ferrante through FTI to examine and assess the dossier's cyber-related claims as an expert witness. In 2018, Ferrante submitted a report stating that Gubarev's web infrastructure had been used by Russian operatives for cyberattacks as described in the dossier. This analysis was included in the court record, though the lawsuit was ultimately dismissed on First Amendment grounds.

== Role in 2016 U.S. Election Cybersecurity ==
While serving as Director for Cyber Incident Response at the White House National Security Council in 2016, Ferrante coordinated the federal response to cyber threats targeting the U.S. presidential election. His work involved addressing potential security breaches in state election systems and voter registration databases. After detecting an intrusion in Illinois's voter registration database, Ferrante and NSC colleagues identified what they assessed to be a broader pattern of probing attempts against election infrastructure across multiple states.

Ferrante helped organize the U.S. government's Election Day cyber response plan, working with agencies such as the FBI, the Department of Homeland Security, and the Department of Justice. The plan involved establishing dedicated communication lines, coordinating with state and local officials, and preparing federal teams to respond to potential disruptions. On Election Day, Ferrante supervised monitoring operations from a secure facility near the White House, with federal agencies prepared to respond to any signs of interference.

In subsequent public statements, Ferrante stated that forensic analysis of the Illinois breach indicated Russian involvement, and noted that additional state systems were similarly targeted during the election period. While investigations found no evidence of vote manipulation, reports indicated concern among officials that these activities could potentially undermine public confidence in the electoral process.

After his government service, Ferrante remained involved in issues related to the 2016 election as a cybersecurity expert in the private sector.
