= Ghanem al-Dosari =

Saudi human rights activist (born 1980)

Ghanem Humood Faraj al-Masarir al-Dosari
- غانم حمود فرج المصارير الدوسري
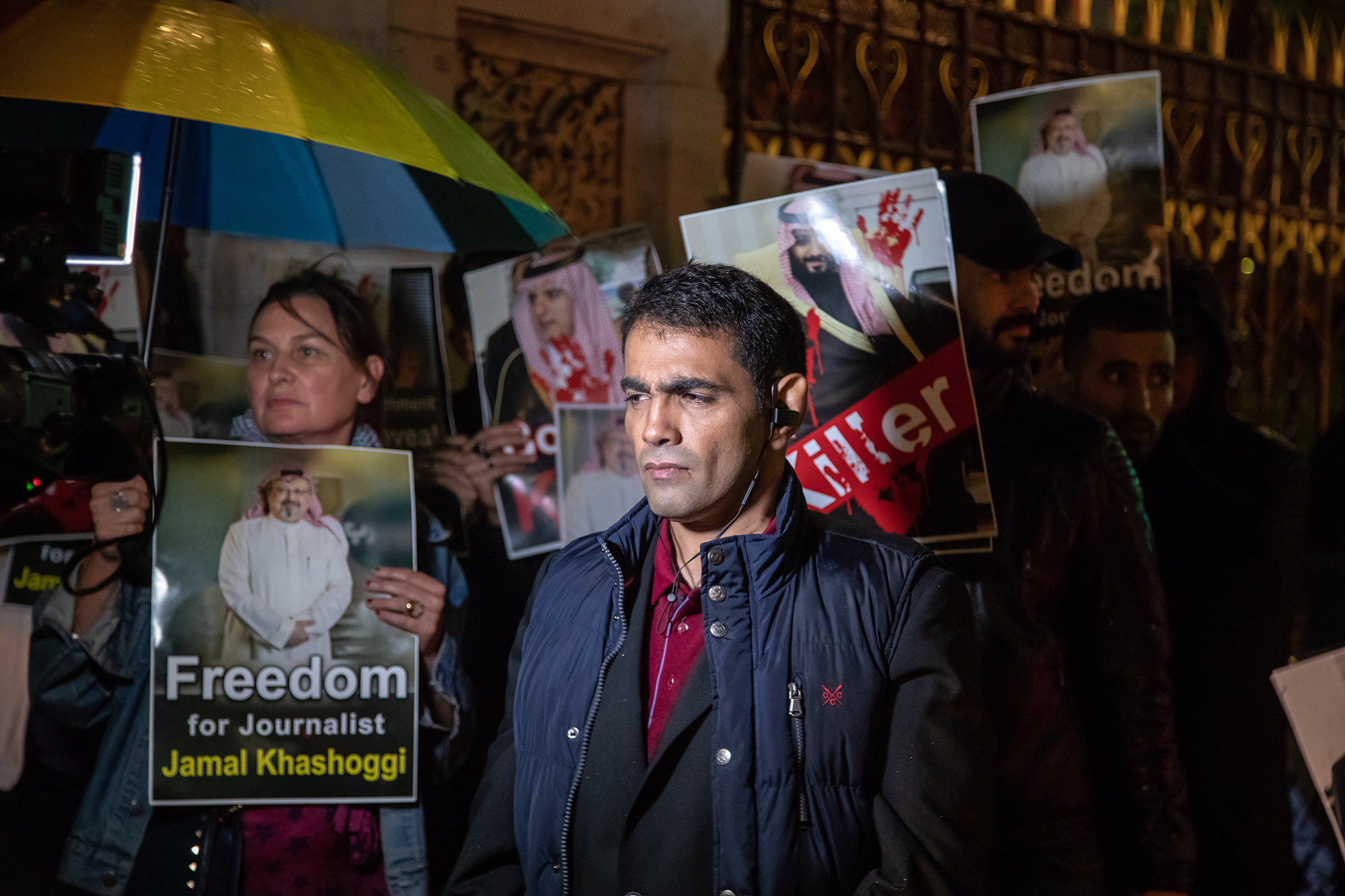
- Ghanem al-Dosari at a protest outside the Natural History Museum, London on 11 October 2018, after the disappearance of Jamal Kashoggi.
- Born: 16 May 1980 (age 45); Aflaj, Saudi Arabia
- Occupations: Saudi human rights activist and satirist
- Known for: Ghanem Show

Ghanem Humood al-Masarir al-Dosari (Arabic: غانم حمود المصارير الدوسري; born May 16, 1980, in Aflaj, Saudi Arabia) is a London-based Saudi human rights activist and a popular political satirist. He hosts an online talk show named the Ghanem Show, which features segments such as "Fadfada" where he criticizes the Saudi royal family (especially King Salman and Crown Prince Mohammad bin Salman) through the use of black comedy.

He has been targeted by the Saudi government for his commentary, which includes being attacked, threatened with harm, and being hacked by the Saudi government.

== Early life and education ==
Al-Masarir left his hometown of Al-Kharj in 2003, in order to study computer science at the University of Portsmouth.

In 2012 he applied for political asylum in Britain, which was granted in 2018.

== Media and Political Satirists ==
Al-Dosari has been based in London since 2003 in self-imposed exile, where he has operated his YouTube-based talk show since 2015. In his talk show, al-Dosari criticizes the Saudi royal family, in particular King Salman and Crown Prince Mohammad, whom he labels as "Salmanco" (referring to the methods exercised by the King in managing the country in a fashion similar to a company or as personal possession) and "al-Dub al-Dasher" (fat crumpet) respectively in a humorous manner, "exposes secrets" related to the royal family, and calls for protests against the Saudi government. Al-Dosari has been accused by Saud al-Qahtani, advisor to the Saudi Royal Court at minister rank, of being guilty of crimes related to "visa fraud" in his home country.

Al-Dosari had spearheaded a protest movement known as "September 15 Movement" that took place throughout Saudi Arabia on September 15, 2017, which has been described as having a "huge following". The demonstrations called for by al-Dosari come at a stage where the current crisis with Qatar had allowed opponents to rally unprecedented support with which they have never before been able to assemble, which may be the cause of the nervousness of authorities towards the protests. Up to twenty prominent clergymen such as Salman al-Ouda and Awadh al-Qarni had been arrested due to being perceived as "pro-Doha" and a large following in social networks which the Saudi government feared would be utilized to support the protests called for by al-Dosari. Numerous leading clerics linked to the Saudi state such as Grand Mufti Abdul-Aziz ibn Abdullah Al ash-Sheikh and Saleh Al Maghamsi have criticized al-Dosari's movement and called for Saudi citizens to strongly oppose it.

As of 14 September 2017, al-Dosari had around 424,000 followers on Twitter and hundreds of thousands to millions of views on his YouTube videos.

On 24 October 2018, in response to the assassination of Jamal Khashoggi, al-Dosari and twelve others protested in front of the Saudi Arabian embassy in London, displaying "Justice for Jamal" banners, chanting calls for finding Khashoggi's body, and claiming that Mohammad bin Salman was responsible for the killing. Al-Dosari said that he was not deterred by the assassination.

== Harassment and beating ==
According to Arab Digest and Global Policy, al-Dosari was threatened with decapitation by Prince Abdulaziz bin Mashour, a brother of Sara bint Mashour Al Saud, the wife of Mohammad bin Salman, and on 10 September 2017 with being killed and eaten by Majed Maliki, who claims to have killed several people.

On 31 August 2018, al-Dosari was attacked during the daytime in London in front of Harrods by two men who shouted at him, "Who are you to talk about the family of al-Saud?". Al-Dosari responded to the assailants that they were not in Riyadh, and that "this is London". One of the two men answered, "F*** London, their Queen is our slave and their police are our dogs." Al-Dosari believed that the attackers were Saudis carrying out an intimidation campaign because of his human rights activities and political views. Al-Dosari was punched in the face and had to be treated in an ambulance. While Dosari was being treated by paramedics, his friend was approached by a third man who tried to bribe the friend not to report the incident. The friend assumed that the third man was another Saudi government agent.

In late October, 2018, Scotland Yard started a high-level investigation and interviewed Dosari about the incident. "I think they are taking it seriously now after Jamal Khashoggi", he stated.

== Hacking target ==
In 2018, al-Dosari was the target of hacking attempts. His phones were targeted by the Pegasus spyware, likely on behalf of the Saudi authorities.

On 28 May 2019, al-Dosari's solicitor served a claim on the SA embassy in London. On 19 August 2022, the High Court ruled that the claim could proceed. On 26 January 2026, the High Court ordered SA to pay £3m in damages to al-Dosari.

== External ==
- Ghanem al-Dosary's YouTube channel
- Ghanem al-Dosari on Twitter
