= Jeff Bezos phone hacking incident =

Incident involving Jeff Bezos and Saudi Arabia

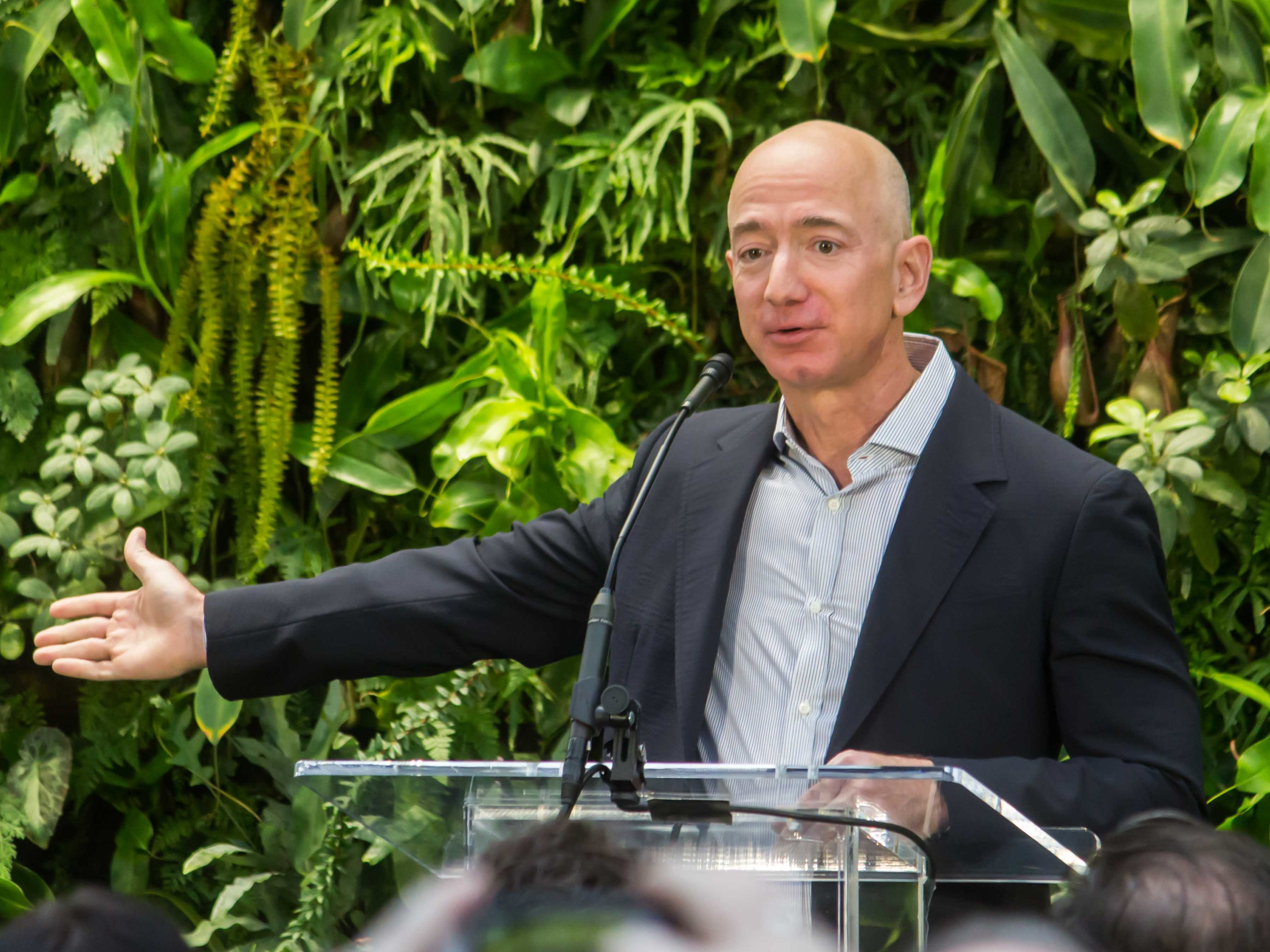
Jeff Bezos in 2018

In January 2020, FTI Consulting claimed that in May 2018 with "medium to high confidence" the phone of Jeff Bezos had been hacked by a file sent from the WhatsApp account of the crown prince of Saudi Arabia, Mohammed bin Salman. The Saudi Arabian embassy to the United States has denied the allegations. Billionaire Jeff Bezos, the owner of The Washington Post newspaper and founder of the company Amazon, engaged FTI Consulting in February 2019 after the National Enquirer reported details of Bezos's affair in January 2019. FTI Consulting did not link the National Enquirer to the hack. In December 2021, the FBI stated they could not find proof to substantiate claims that Saudi Arabia hacked Jeff Bezos's phone, and has considered an investigation into those allegations a low priority.

== Background ==
Starting in September 2017, The Washington Post, which is owned by Bezos, published a series of columns by Jamal Khashoggi that were critical of Saudi Arabia or bin Salman. In April 2018, Bezos attended a small dinner with bin Salman and exchanged WhatsApp numbers. Bezos and bin Salman proceeded to exchange friendly messages. Khashoggi was assassinated in October 2018; Washington Post reporting became increasingly critical of the role of Saudi regime and bin Salman in the murder.

== Alleged incident ==
According to a United Nations analysis of the evidence of surveillance on Bezos's phone, the following events occurred on May 1, 2018:

A message from the Crown Prince account was sent to Mr. Bezos through WhatsApp. The message is an encrypted video file. It is later established, with reasonable certainty, that the video's downloader infects Mr. Bezos' phone with malicious code.

— United Nations Special Rapporteur on extrajudicial, summary or arbitrary executions, Agnès Callamard, and David Kaye, the Special Rapporteur on the promotion and protection of the right to freedom of opinion and expression

== Investigations ==
In January 2019, the National Enquirer released details of Bezos having conducted an affair. Bezos had security specialist Gavin de Becker lead an investigation into how the National Enquirer obtained the information.

In February 2019, Bezos wrote a post on Medium, accusing The National Enquirer and its parent company American Media, Inc. (AMI) of extortion and blackmail of him with images of his affair. In the post, Bezos referenced that AMI had been investigated for "various actions they've taken on behalf of the Saudi Government", and stated that the reporting of The Washington Post on the killing of Jamal Khashoggi "is undoubtedly unpopular in certain circles".

Later in February 2019, Bezos and de Becker hired digital forensic experts from the FTI Consulting company to analyse Bezos's iPhone. The Wall Street Journal later reported that Bezos did not want to give his phone directly to the Federal Bureau of Investigation (FBI); thus he had FTI Consulting do the work. Some FTI Consulting workers previously worked for the FBI. The Wall Street Journal also reported that FTI Consulting communicated with law enforcement officials about their work.

In March 2019, de Becker wrote an article for The Daily Beast, stating that Bezos' and his "investigators and several experts concluded with high confidence that the Saudis had access to Bezos's phone, and gained private information". de Becker also reported he had presented details of his investigation to law enforcement officials; furthermore, he said there was a "close relationship" between bin Salman and American Media CEO David Pecker. He highlighted that AMI had attempted to have him publicly declare that the investigation into Bezos's phone found that AMI had not used "eavesdropping or hacking in their newsgathering process", and had demanded his declaration that AMI's story was not "influenced in any manner by external forces". Lastly, de Becker stated that it was "unclear" whether AMI knew of the alleged hack by the Saudis.

In April 2019, Bezos was interviewed by federal investigators when the FBI was researching whether Israeli technology company NSO Group had conducted hacks into people and companies in the United States. As of November 2021, probes by the U.S. government have not led to public action against the National Enquirer or Saudi Arabia.

In November 2019, FTI Consulting finished compiling the report for the forensic analysis of Bezos's phone.

The Guardian broke the story on January 21, 2020, of the results of the analysis of Bezos's phone, reporting that the analysis indicated it was highly likely that Bezos's phone had been infiltrated by a malicious video file sent from bin Salman's WhatsApp account. FTI Consulting's conclusion was made with "medium to high confidence", the report stated. The full forensic report was published by Motherboard on January 23, 2020.

The report stated that just "hours" after Bezos received the file from bin Salman, his phone began transmitting dramatically higher amounts of data, and that this continued for months. The video in the file was not infected, but the downloader of the file could not be analyzed by investigators because it was encrypted by WhatsApp. The report points to two pieces of circumstantial evidence: first, a November 2018 message from bin Salman to Bezos includes an image resembling the woman Bezos was having an affair with, despite the affair not being public knowledge at the time; second, a February 2019 text from bin Salman to Bezos urges Bezos not to believe everything, after Bezos was briefed on the phone regarding an Internet campaign against him conducted by Saudis. The report states that investigators' belief that bin Salman's advisor, Saud al-Qahtani, obtained the hacking software. The report does not link The National Enquirer to the hack.

The United Nations special rapporteur on summary executions and extrajudicial killings Agnès Callamard and special rapporteur on freedom of expression David Kaye reviewed a forensic analysis of Bezos' phone. On January 22, 2020, Callamard and Kaye stated that "the allegations are also reinforced by other evidence of Saudi targeting of dissidents and perceived opponents". They noted other phones that were hacked from May 2018 to June 2018, belonging to two Khashoggi associates (Yahya Assiri and Omar Abdulaziz), an Amnesty International official, and Saudi dissident Ghanem al-Dosari. The UN experts stated: "During the same period, Mr. Bezos was widely targeted in Saudi social media as an alleged adversary of the Kingdom. This was part of a massive, clandestine online campaign against Mr. Bezos and Amazon, apparently targeting him principally as the owner of The Washington Post." As a result, Callamard and Kaye called for "immediate investigation" by relevant authorities of the alleged phone hacks, "including investigation of the continuous, multi-year, direct and personal involvement of the Crown Prince in efforts to target perceived opponents."

== Reaction to allegations ==
In February 2019, Adel al-Jubeir, minister of state for foreign affairs for Saudi Arabia, announced the country had "absolutely nothing to do with the hacking".

In March 2019, AMI released a statement responding to de Becker's column that the only source for their story on Bezos was Michael Sanchez, the brother of Bezos's girlfriend and that there was "no involvement by any other third party whatsoever". A year later, Michael Sanchez sued AMI, stating in court documents that when the National Enquirer first contacted him, they already had "raunchy text messages and nude selfies exchanged" by Bezos and Sanchez's sister. Michael Sanchez denied giving AMI explicit photos and accused AMI of hacking Bezos's phone.

In January 2020, the Twitter account of the kingdom's U.S. embassy explicitly rejected the claim that Saudi Arabia was behind the hack, and called for an investigation into the incident.

== Analysis ==
The Guardian speculated in January 2020 that the hacking allegation would weaken bin Salman's ability to attract more Western investors to Saudi Arabia and lead to renewed scrutiny of the murder of Khashoggi and bin Salman's involvement. The outlet also reported that Saudi experts believed that Bezos was hacked because of The Washington Post's coverage of Saudi Arabia, including Khashoggi's criticism of bin Salman. One such expert was Andrew Miller, who served on the national security council under President Obama, who claimed that Bezos' targeting by the crown prince reflects the personality-centric nature of Saudi politics.

The Washington Post in January 2020 quoted security researchers as saying that "Bezos probably fell victim to the iPhone's Achilles' heel: Its defences are so difficult to penetrate that once sophisticated attackers are in, they can go largely undetected." One of the reported reasons for this weakness of the iPhone was that its maker Apple "employs a secretive approach to finding and fixing security".

United Nations special rapporteurs Agnès Callamard and David Kaye stated in January 2020 that the alleged hacking suggests that there was "an effort to influence, if not silence, the Washington Post's reporting on Saudi Arabia", with bin Salman possibly part of the operation. They declared that the alleged hacking was relevant to the issue of whether bin Salman was involved in the killing of Jamal Khashoggi.

MIT Technology Review offered the opinion in January 2020 that FTI Consulting's report "lacks conclusive evidence", noting that it failed to decisively identify the specific spyware used against Bezos.

Motherboard in January 2020 quoted mobile forensic expert Sarah Edwards that FTI's results, as reported in January 2020, were only about 50% complete. Edwards pointed to a lack of analysis of core files, "where that state-sponsored malware is going to be found". Meanwhile, Vladimir Katalov, the leader of an iOS forensics company, opined to Motherboard that it seemed as if the "experts were not qualified enough".
