= Dawoud al-Marhoon =

Saudi Arabian political prisoner

- Born: February 1995 (age 31); Al-Awamiyah, Saudi Arabia
- Known for: 2011–12 Saudi Arabian protests, death penalty

Dawoud al-Marhoon is a Saudi Arabian citizen who participated in the Saudi Arabian protests during the Arab Spring as a teenager. He was arrested on May 22, 2012 and was sentenced to death in September 2014, after which he was held in prison while awaiting ratification of his sentence by King Abdullah and then King Salman.

== Early life ==
Dawoud was born in Al-Awamiyah and attended Altarfih al-Sahil High School. He has a mother and a younger sister, but his father died when he was young. As a teenager, Dawood was sociable and popular. He loved playing football and computer games. He excelled in his studies and dreamed of pursuing his love for technology and computers by pursuing a degree in engineering.

== Arab Spring and arrest ==
Dawoud participated in the 2011–12 Saudi Arabian protests during the Arab Spring. Originally, in March 2012, he was questioned by Saudi police and asked to be an informant and report details about fellow protesters. After he refused, Saudi security forces arrested him from the Dammam Central Hospital, where he was undergoing treatment for an eye injury sustained in a traffic accident. Saudi forces surrounded the hospital and arrested him as he prepared for surgery.

At the time of Dawoud's arrest, he was 17. He was one of three minors (along with Ali al-Nimr and Abdullah al-Zaher, 16 and 17, respectively) arrested for offences committed while participating in anti-government protests in Saudi Arabia's Eastern Province in 2012. All three were sentenced to death by the Specialized Criminal Court (SCC) in 2014 after what have been characterized as "flawed trials". During his arrest, Dawoud was allegedly forced to sign a confession, which was later relied upon to convict him. According to Reprieve, he was arrested without a warrant and tortured. Legal conditions of Dawoud's case included refusal by authorities of regular access to his lawyer.

Governments, activists, and human rights organizations all around the world condemned the Saudi government for the three boys' arrest, detainment and sentences. Amnesty International led a campaign for authorities not to execute them.

After the death penalty for crimes committed by minors was revoked by royal decree in 2020, in August that same year, the public prosecutor ordered a review of Dawoud, Ali and Abdullah's sentences. Finally, in February 2021, the Saudi Arabian Specialized Criminal Court commuted the death sentence of Dawoud, Ali and Abdullah and re-sentenced them to 10-year prison terms inclusive of time served, meaning that they could be released in 2022.

== See also ==
- Human rights in Saudi Arabia
