= Balqarn =

Governorate of Saudi Arabia

Coordinates: 19°42′N 41°55′E

- Governorate
- Interactive map of Balqarn
- Country: Saudi Arabia
- Province: Asir Province
- Time zone: UTC+3 (EAT)
  - Summer (DST): UTC+3 (EAT)

Balqarn (Arabic: بلقرن) is one of the governorates in Asir Province, Saudi Arabia.
