= 2022 Saudi Arabia mass execution =

2022 mass execution in Saudi Arabia

On 12 March 2022, the Kingdom of Saudi Arabia carried out the mass execution of 81 men, including 7 Yemenis, 1 Syrian and 37 Saudi nationals on terrorism related charges and for holding deviant beliefs. The UN High Commissioner for Human Rights understood that 41 were minority Shia Muslims who had participated in anti-government demonstrations calling for greater political participation in 2011–2012. Rights groups accused the government of adopting restrictive regulations against religious expression and political beliefs, as well as criticising its use of the death sentence, even for children arrested, and citing the execution as a violation of human rights.

The execution was the largest carried out in the kingdom in recent years. There is no mention of how these executions were carried out.

== Background ==
Capital punishment is a legal penalty in Saudi Arabia. Execution is usually carried out by beheading with a sword or occasionally by shooting in public. Despite having signed the Convention on the Rights of the Child, Saudi Arabia executed offenders who were juveniles at the time of the crime up until 26 April 2020. In January 2022, there were at least 43 detainees threatened with execution, including 12 minors.

In recent years, the kingdom has carried out a number of mass executions of civilians convicted for terrorism, most notably a mass execution of 47 convicts in 2016 and another one of similar scale in 2019.

The UN High Commissioner for Human Rights Michelle Bachelet noted the extremely broad Saudi definition of terrorism, which generically includes nonviolent persons in opposition to the ruling government in addition to those espousing atheism or any religion other than Wahhabi Islam.

== Event ==
On 12 March 2022, the Kingdom of Saudi Arabia carried out the execution of 81 men on charges of loyalty to foreign terrorist organizations and holding deviant beliefs, as Saudi Press Agency (SPA) reported on the same day. The interior ministry claimed in a statement, the crimes perpetrated by these men include committing loyalty to foreign terrorist organizations, such as the Islamic State, Al-Qaeda and the Houthi movement and murdering innocent people. 37 of those executed were Saudi nationals who were convicted of one count of trying to assassinate government employees, smuggling weapons into the country, and targeting police stations, vital economic locations, and convoys. The SPA did not report on how they were executed. According to the SPA report, the charged were supplied with the right to a lawyer and their full rights under Saudi law during the judicial process.

These mass executions were carried out as the crown prince of Saudi Arabia, Mohammed bin Salman Al Saud, claimed that the country was reforming the judiciary and restricting the use of the death penalty in Saudi Arabia. According to The New York Times, the war in Yemen, the Assassination of Jamal Khashoggi, the Washington Post columnist, in a Saudi consulate in 2018, the execution of minors, and a crackdown on dissent have thwarted Saudi Arabia's efforts to create a clean image in recent years.

== Reaction ==
Human rights groups condemned the executions. Ali Adubusi, head of the European Saudi Organisation for Human Rights said: "These executions are the opposite of justice". There were no charges that deserve the death penalty under the benchmarks that Saudi Arabia has made public. Some of the executions were only accused of participating in rights protests. Crown prince Mohammed bin Salman Al Saud said that the country was reforming the judiciary and restricting the use of the death penalty in Saudi Arabia.

On 23 December 2022, The Daily Telegraph stated in a letter to James Cleverly signed by MPs the party including David Davis, Hilary Benn, Peter Bottomley, Andy Slaughter and Alistair Carmichael: Saudi Arabia may carry out a mass execution during the Christmas holidays. The kingdom carried out executions during the festive and New Year periods as did it 2016 and 2020 when it is more difficult for the international community to react quickly.

== See also ==
- 2017–19 Saudi Arabian purge
- 2018–2019 Saudi crackdown on feminists
- Awad bin Mohammed Al-Qarni
