= 2019 Saudi Arabia mass execution =

Mass execution carried out by the Kingdom of Saudi Arabia in 2019

On 23 April 2019, the Kingdom of Saudi Arabia carried out a mass execution of 37 imprisoned civilians who had been convicted, 21 on the basis of confessions allegedly obtained under coercion and torture, for terrorism-related allegations in six provinces in the country. Fourteen of the people executed had been convicted in relation to their participation in the 2011–2012 Saudi Arabian protests in Qatif, mostly on the basis of torture-induced confessions. The executions were carried out by beheading, and two of the bodies were left on public display. According to Saudi Arabia's Interior Ministry the convicts were all Saudi nationals. Thirty-two of those executed belonged to the country's Shia minority.

== Background ==
Conflict between Saudi authorities and Qatif residents dates back to at least the 1979 Qatif Uprising. The conflict reemerged between Saudi authorities and political protestors during the 2011–2012 Saudi Arabian protests and continued through to the 2017–2020 Qatif unrest. The conflict involves peaceful protestors as well as armed confrontations between residents and Saudi authorities, siege barricades erected by the authorities in Al-Awamiyah and attempted destruction of residential areas by the authorities. The "Qatif 24 case" was a Saudi legal case concerning 24 Qatif region protestors. Fourteen of the people executed on 23 April 2019 were among the "Qatif 24", including Mujtaba al-Sweikat and Munir al-Adam. Human Rights Watch stated that most of the convictions were based on confessions obtained under torture.

Another eleven of the people executed had been convicted in the "Iran spy case".

Both the 14 of the Qatif 24 case and 11 in the Iran spy case had been convicted by the Specialized Criminal Court, which conducts trials for alleged terrorists and human rights activists.

The European Saudi Organisation for Human Rights (ESOHR) followed the cases of many of the detainees prior to their execution. Among these, none of the detainees were allowed access to lawyers during the arrest and investigation stages of their cases, and 21 of them had their confessions extracted under duress and torture.

Both ESOHR and CNN obtained access to many of the court records. CNN stated that it had "hundreds of pages of documents from three 2016 trials involving 25" of the executees. CNN described the "Qatif 24 case" as involving charges related to the 2011–2012 Saudi Arabian protests of the Arab Spring. It said that the fourteen executees among the "Qatif 24" were all charged with "joining a terror cell" and all denied the charge. Nader al-Sweikat, father of executee Mujtaba al-Sweikat of the "Qatif 24", stated that "only few of the 24 men committed real crimes". Both ESOHR and CNN concluded that the prosecution's cases were mostly based on false confessions.

== Executions ==
On 23 April 2019, Saudi Arabia's Interior Ministry stated that Saudi men had been executed that day for the "terrorism related crimes" of "adopting terrorist and extremist thinking and [of] forming terrorist cells to corrupt and destabilize security". Thirty two of those executed belonged to the country's Shia minority. The executions, which were carried out by beheading, were conducted in the capital Riyadh, the Muslim holy cities of Mecca and Medina, the central province of Al-Qassim, Shia-populated Eastern Province and the southern province of Asir. The bodies of two of the executed men were publicly displayed on a pole for several hours as a warning to others. This was described by the Daily Times as "[sparking] controversy because of its grisly display". According to Amnesty International, many of the families of Shia Muslims executed in the mass execution had not been informed in advance and were shocked to learn of the news. Among the executions was that of a young man who was convicted of a crime that took place while he was under the age of 18, Abdulkareem al-Hawaj, a young Shi'a man who was arrested at the age of 16 and convicted of offences related to his involvement in anti-government protests. According to United Nations High Commissioner for Human Rights Michelle Bachelet, "at least three of those killed were minors at the time of their sentencing", in violation of international law that prohibits the use of the death penalty against anyone under the age of 18.

== Executees ==
One of the executees, Hussein al-Humaidy, was severely pressured prior to his sentencing and execution. Al-Humaidy confirmed to the judge, as officially recorded, that "severe psychological and physical pressure" was used during interrogations. Nine among the executees who provided forced confessions and/or were tortured included the following:

- Hussein al-Abboud was charged with giving information to Iranian authorities about the Qatif conflict, participating in the conflict, and meeting with Ali Khamenei. Al-Abboud stated that his confession was false and forced, and that he had been threatened with torture.
- Munir al-Adam, a minor, lost his hearing in one ear as a result of torture. According to ESOHR, he was punished for exercising "fundamental human rights such as freedom of assembly". During the trial, al-Adam said that his confession was false, stating, "Those aren't my words. I didn't write a letter. This is defamation written by the interrogator with his own hand."
- Sheikh Mohammad Attiya was pressured to sign a confession against his will.
- Abbas al-Hassan was accused of spying for Iran and physically tortured by beatings and sleep deprivation as well as psychologically tortured by threats to arrest his family.
- Abdulkarim al-Hawaj, a minor, was tortured during his detainment, with methods including beatings, electric shocks and being kicked with heavy shoes.
- Hussein Mohammed al-Musallam denied his confession during his trial, stating, "Nothing in these confessions is correct and I cannot prove that I was forced to do it. But there are medical reports from the prison hospital of Dammam and I ask your honor to summon them. They show the effects of torture on my body."
- Yusuf Abdullah al-Omri was pressured into signing a confession by being insulted and slapped. The presiding judge refused to refer to a videotape of the confession.
- Salman Quraysh, a minor, was tortured by beatings, electric shocks and by being forced to take hallucinogenic pills, and was hospitalised four times as a result of the torture.
- Mujtaba al-Sweikat was tortured and signed a false confession.

Mujtaba al-Sweikat was a minor at the time of his arrest on 12 August 2012, while trying to fly to the United States to study at Western Michigan University. During his investigation, al-Sweikat was hung by his hands, beaten with wires and hoses, stubbed with cigarettes, slapped and beaten with shoes, and left with insufficient heating during the winter. He was given a choice between signing a false confession or returning to the investigation; he chose to sign the false confession to avoid further torture. According to al-Sweikat's father, who defended him in court, the case against Mujtaba was intended to "create the illusion of a terror cell", which in reality did not exist. Al-Sweikat's father said that his son participated in the Qatif demonstrations only twice, and for only five minutes each time.

== Reactions ==
- Human Rights Watch quickly condemned the killings: "Today's mass execution of mostly Shia citizens is a day we have feared for several years," said Adam Coogle, Middle East researcher at HRW.
- Amnesty International condemned the executions, labeling them "a chilling demonstration of the authorities' disregard for human life." Lynn Maalouf, Middle East Research Director at Amnesty International, described these executions as a political tool for suppressing Shi'a opponents in Saudi Arabia and said that "It is also yet another gruesome indication of how the death penalty is being used as a political tool to crush dissent from within the country's Shia minority." Amnesty International's Middle East and North Africa advocacy director, Philippe Nassif, stated that mass executions and human rights abuses increased during the leadership of Crown Prince Mohammed bin Salman. He said that in the context of negative United States foreign policy towards Iran, Saudi Arabian authorities justify their local and international attacks on Shiite communities by claiming that they are opposing Iranian influence.
- Iran's foreign minister Mohammad Javad Zarif criticised the administration of US President Donald Trump for making no comments on the mass execution. He referred to Trump's support for Saudi Crown Prince Mohammed bin Salman and said that "Membership in the #B_team —Bolton, Bin Salman, Bin Zayed & 'Bibi— gives immunity for any crime."

== See also ==
- Capital punishment in Saudi Arabia
- 2017–19 Saudi Arabian purge
- 2016 Saudi Arabia mass execution
- 2022 Saudi Arabia mass execution
- 2018–2019 Saudi crackdown on feminists
