= Capital punishment in Saudi Arabia =

Capital punishment is a legal penalty in Saudi Arabia. Most executions in the country are carried out by decapitation (beheading). Saudi Arabia is the only country that still uses this method. Capital punishment is used both for people charged with lethal crimes and people charged with non-lethal crimes (including drug offenses, sexual offenses, "sorcery", and "witchcraft"). Over two-thirds of those executed are charged with non-lethal drug offenses. Also among those executed are individuals charged with non-lethal terrorism, a charge that has been used against individuals who participated in protests against the authoritarian regime in Saudi Arabia.

Death sentences are almost exclusively based on the system of judicial sentencing discretion (tazir), following the classical principle of avoiding Sharia-prescribed (hudud) penalties when possible. In response to a 1970s rise in violent crime, these sentences increased. This paralleled similar developments in the United States and mainland China in the late 20th century.

A central square in the Kingdom's capital, Riyadh, became known in the West as "Chop-Chop Square" due to public executions there.

The kingdom executed at least 158 people in 2015, at least 154 in 2016, at least 146 in 2017, 149 in 2018, 184 in 2019, 69 in 2020, 196 in 2022, 172 in 2023, 345 in 2024, and 356 in 2025.

In 2022, Saudi Arabia executed more people than in any year over the previous three decades. The largest known mass execution in the country's history was carried out on March 12 that year, when 81 people were executed, including seven Yemenis and one Syrian. In 2024, executions reached a new high of 345, almost exactly doubling the 172 executions carried out in 2023. In the first half of 2025, 180 executions took place. The Guardian reported that 2025 had more executions than last year. Analysts have largely attributed the increase in executions to Saudi Arabia's "war on drugs", with 243 executions in 2025 being for drug-related offenses alone.

== Method ==
Saudi Arabia has a criminal justice system based on Shari'ah. Execution is usually carried out by beheading with a sword, but may occasionally be performed by firing squad.

Sentences are primarily given on confession. Human Rights Watch says the majority of people are tortured to obtain confession and courts have not investigated it. As of April 2020, minors under 18, who commit crimes will no longer face execution when they turn 18, and would instead face a maximum of 10 years in a juvenile detention facility.

A 2018 report by the European Saudi Organization for Human Rights (ESOHR) asserts that the number of beheadings in the kingdom during the first quarter of 2018 rose by over 70 percent compared to the same period in 2017. 2024 was the year with the highest number of beheadings in several decades (330).

=== Use of public executions ===
Saudi Arabia performed public executions until recently. In 2022, no public executions were recorded; as of 2024, despite the increased number of executions, Deera Square – the former site of public beheadings – had become "dominated by cafes and restaurants with almost no sign of its bloody past".

Public beheadings typically took place around 9 a.m. The convicted person was walked to a courtyard near the courthouse and kneeled in front of the executioner. A police official announced the crimes committed by the person and the beheading took place. The executioner used a sword known as a sulthan to remove the condemned person's head from his or her body at the neck. After a medical examiner inspected the body and pronounced the convict dead, a police official announced the crimes committed by the beheaded convict once again and the process was complete. Professional executioners beheaded as many as 10 people in a single day.

Crucifixion of the beheaded body was sometimes ordered in cases where the person was a child molester or a rapist. Crucifixion was also used for offenses such as organized crime; for example, in 2009, the Saudi Gazette reported that "an Abha court had sentenced the leader of an armed gang to death with a three-day crucifixion (public displaying of the beheaded body) and six other gang members to beheading for their role in jewelry store robberies in Asir."

In 2003, Muhammad Saad al-Beshi, whom the BBC described as "Saudi Arabia's leading executioner", gave a rare interview to Arab News. He described his first execution in 1998: "The criminal was tied and blindfolded. With one stroke of the sword I severed his head. It rolled metres away... People are amazed how fast [the sword] can separate the head from the body." He also said that, before an execution, he visits the victim's family to seek forgiveness for the criminal, which can lead to the criminal's life being spared. Once an execution goes ahead, his only conversation with the prisoner is to tell him or her to recite the Muslim declaration of belief, the Shahada. "When they get to the execution area, their strength drains away. Then I read the execution order, and at a signal I cut the prisoner's head off," he said.

== Capital offences ==
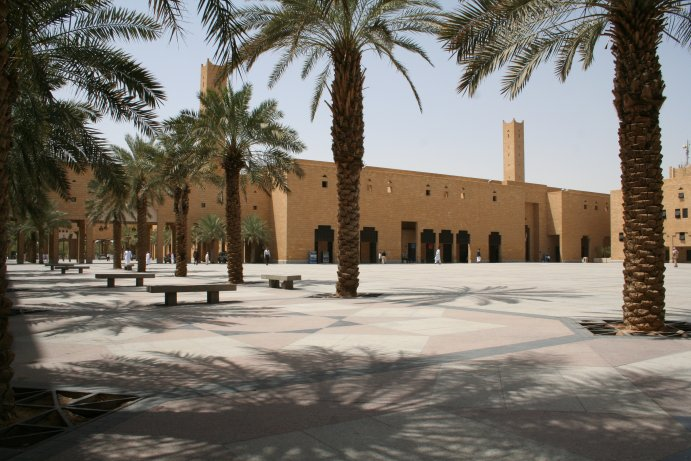
Deera Square, central Riyadh. It used to be the location of public beheadings.

Saudi law technically allows the death penalty for a variety of crimes:

- Apostasy
- Treason
- Homosexuality
- Espionage
- Murder
- Rape
- Terrorism
- Drug smuggling
- Armed robbery
- Blasphemy
- Burglary if aggravated circumstances, including recidivism
- Adultery (unmarried adulterers can be sentenced to 100 lashes, married ones can be sentenced to stoning.)
- Sorcery or witchcraft
- Waging war on God

=== Murder ===
Murder is punishable by death in Saudi Arabia. If a murderer pays a family of the victim blood money, and the family approves of the choice, the murderer will not be executed. The criminal justice system waits until the family makes a decision on whether the family of the victim will accept blood money or if the family of the victim will choose to have the murderer executed, or to completely forgive the perpetrator.

=== Other offences ===
==== Sharia background ====
The Saudi judiciary can impose the death penalty according to three categories of criminal offence in Sharia law:

- Hudud: Fixed punishments for specific crimes. Hudud crimes which can result in the death penalty include apostasy, adultery, and sodomy although requirement of evidence is high and is usually based on confession. Punishment for adultery is stoning. No stoning has taken place in Saudi Arabia for many decades.
- Qisas: Eye-for-an-eye retaliatory punishments. Qisas crimes include murder. Families of someone murdered can choose between demanding the death penalty or granting clemency in return for a payment of diyya, or blood money, by the perpetrator. The amount of blood-money requested can be quite considerable: a recent report mentions a sum of $11 million demanded in exchange for clemency.
- Tazir: A general category, including crimes defined by national regulations, some of which can be punished by death, such as drug trafficking.

A conviction requires proof in one of three ways:

1. An uncoerced confession.
2. The testimony of two male witnesses can result in conviction (except in the case of adultery, in which four are required). This excludes "hudud crimes", in which case a confession is also required.
3. An affirmation or denial by oath can be required.

Giving an oath is taken particularly seriously in a religious society such as Saudi Arabia's, and a refusal to take an oath will be taken as an admission of guilt resulting in conviction.

==== Adultery ====
In order for an individual to be convicted in a Saudi sharia law court of adultery, they must confess to the act four times in front of the court; otherwise four pious male Muslims or two pious men and two women who witnessed the actual sexual penetration must testify in front of the court. If the witnesses were spying on the defendants or intentionally watched the defendants commit adultery, their uprightness would be called into question and a conviction for adultery would not take place. According to the Islamic sharia law, the burden of proof is on the accuser; and if even one of those witnesses retracted their testimony then the accused will be acquitted and the remaining witnesses will be prosecuted for perjury per Quran 24:4.

The execution method for adultery committed by married people is stoning (see Capital offences). If the conviction was established through confession, a retraction of the confession or the defendant leaving the pit while stoning is taking place results in the penalty being stayed. If the conviction was established through the testimony of four witnesses, the witnesses must initiate the stoning, and failure to do so results in the execution being stayed. Sandra Mackey, author of The Saudis: Inside the Desert Kingdom, stated in 1987 that in Saudi Arabia, "unlike the tribal rights of a father to put to death a daughter who has violated her chastity, death sentences under Qur'anic law [for adultery] are extremely rare." Mackey explained that "charges of adultery are never made lightly. Since the penalty is so severe, women are protected from unfounded accusations of sexual misconduct". During a human rights dialogue with European jurists that took place several years before 1987, a Saudi delegate acknowledged that it is difficult to have a person convicted of adultery. According to Mackey, in a 20-year period ending in 1987, one woman "is acknowledged to" have been executed by stoning for adultery.

Princess Misha'al was shot several times in the head for adultery in 1977; investigation revealed she never faced a trial and was executed extrajudicially; scholars have termed her execution as honor killing.

==== Witchcraft ====
Muree bin Ali bin Issa al-Asiri, who was found in possession of talismans, was executed in the southern Najran province in June 2012. A Saudi woman, Amina bin Salem Nasser, was executed for being convicted of practising sorcery and witchcraft in December 2011 in Al Jawf Region, and a Sudanese man (Abdul Hamid Bin Hussain Bin Moustafa al-Fakki) was executed in a car park in Medina for the same reason on 20 September 2011. In 2014, Mohammed bin Bakr al-Alawi was beheaded on 5 August for allegedly practising black magic and sorcery.

== Mass executions ==
=== 2016 ===
On 2 January 2016, the Kingdom of Saudi Arabia carried out a mass execution of 47 imprisoned civilians convicted for terrorism in 12 different provinces. Forty-three were beheaded and four were executed by firing squads. Among the 47 people killed was Shia Sheikh Nimr al-Nimr. The execution was the largest carried out in the kingdom since 1980. These executions were the first to be carried out in 2016, with rights groups claiming that Saudi Arabia had executed at least 157 people in the year prior. In 2015, it was said that this year holds the greatest number of executions since 1995.

=== 2019 ===
On 23 April 2019, the Saudi Interior Ministry stated that the Kingdom carried out a mass execution of 37 imprisoned civilians who had been convicted, mostly on the basis of confessions obtained under torture or written by the accused's torturers, for terrorism-related allegations in 6 provinces in the country. Fourteen of the people executed had been convicted in relation to their participation in the 2011–12 Saudi Arabian protests in Qatif, mostly on the basis of torture-induced confessions. The executions were carried out by beheading, and two of the bodies were publicly hung from a pole. According to Saudi Arabia's Interior Ministry the convicts were all Saudi nationals. Thirty two of those executed belonged to the country's Shia minority. One of the thirty-two, Abdul Kareem Al Hawaj, was 16 years old at the time of his alleged crime; executions for crimes committed by those under 18 are violations of international law. According to Reprieve, two others were also under 18 at the time of their alleged crimes, Mujtaba al-Sweikat and Salman Qureish. The bodies of at least 33 out of these 37 people executed were not handed back to their families. The Saudi government did not publicly explain why, and had not handed back the corpses of those executed as of 8 April 2020.

=== 2022 ===
In March 2022, Saudi Arabia executed 81 people, exceeding the 67 people executed in 2021. The men executed included 37 Saudi nationals, some Yemenis and Syrians, and were allegedly convicted of several criminal offenses such as the murder of innocent men, women, and children, as per the official statement issued. Rights groups accused the government of imposing restrictive laws against religious expression and political views and criticized its use of the death penalty, including those arrested as minors, and cited the execution as a violation of human rights. However, the government of Saudi Arabia denied the accusations of human rights abuse and claimed that the said laws were imposed to protect its national security.

=== 2023 ===
Saudi Arabia carried out 172 executions in 2023. Among the executed were six women; an increase from the previous year.

=== 2024 ===
As of 9 October 2024, Saudi Arabia had executed 213 people, the highest number executed by the kingdom in a single year on record. By 18 July, the Saudi government had already executed 106 people, seven of whom were executed for drug-related offenses. By that time in the previous year, the kingdom had executed at least 74 people. In late December, the human rights organization Reprieve reported that Saudi Arabia had executed 330 people that year, the highest annual number in decades. Over 150 of these executions were for non-lethal crimes.

=== 2025 ===
By late December 2025, 347 people were executed in Saudi Arabia, according to Reprieve. This made it the second year in a row the kingdom broke its own execution record, resulting in condemnations from various human rights groups.

=== 2026 ===
As of 15 November 2026, Saudi Arabia had carried out 211 executions, according to an Agence France-Presse tally. Seventeen of those executed had been convicted on terrorism-related charges, compared with 40 people executed on such charges throughout 2025. The tally also recorded 126 executions for drug trafficking, 90 of which involved foreign nationals. Earlier in the year, Amnesty International reported that 96 people had been executed between 1 January and 22 June, including 61 for drug-related offences. The European Saudi Organization for Human Rights separately documented 108 executions during the first half of the year, 71 of them for drug-related offences.

Several of those executed in 2026 had been convicted of offences allegedly committed when they were children. On 9 April, Saudi authorities executed Ali al-Subaiti, who had been convicted of participating in a demonstration when he was 12. According to Human Rights Watch, his case also involved charges under Saudi Arabia's counterterrorism law. Hassan Zaki al-Faraj was executed on 17 October after being convicted of several offences, including one allegedly committed when he was 14. Human Rights Watch reported that both men had been prosecuted under counterterrorism provisions. On 14 November, Saudi authorities executed Fadel al-Safwani and Jawad Qureiris in the Eastern Province. In a statement announcing the executions, the Interior Ministry said that the two men had been convicted of offences including joining a foreign terrorist organization and firing on security personnel. Reprieve reported that Qureiris had been arrested in December 2020 over alleged involvement in protests and activities on social media. The organization said that he was 14 at the time of the alleged protest-related offences and alleged that he had been tortured during interrogation to force him to confess.

== Criticism ==
The use of public beheading as the method of capital punishment and the number of executions have attracted strong international criticism. Several executions, particularly of foreign workers, have sparked international outrage.

In June 2011, Ruyati binti Satubi, an Indonesian maid, was beheaded for killing her employer's wife, reportedly after years of abuse. Her execution drew extensive criticism from Indonesian press, Government and human rights groups.

In September 2011, a Sudanese migrant worker was beheaded for sorcery, an execution which Amnesty International condemned as "appalling". Amnesty International said that Saudi Arabia does not have a formal law on sorcery but some conservative clerics call for the strictest punishment possible.

In January 2013, a Sri Lankan maid named Rizana Nafeek was beheaded after she was convicted of murdering a child under her care, an event which she attributed to the infant's choking. The execution drew international condemnation of the government's practices, and led Sri Lanka to recall its ambassador.

These are not isolated cases. According to figures by Amnesty International, in 2010 at least 27 migrant workers were executed and, as of January 2013, more than 45 foreign maids were on death row awaiting execution.

In practice, capital punishment has also been used to sentence political protesters. Ali al-Nimr and Dawoud al-Marhoon were both arrested at the age of 17 in 2012 during Arab Spring protests in the Eastern Province, tortured, forced to confess, and sentenced to decapitation in 2014 and 2015. Sheikh Nimr al Nimr, an independent sheikh critical of the Saudi government and popular among youth and Ali al Nimr's uncle, was also arrested in 2012 and sentenced to death by the Specialized Criminal Court in 2014 for his role in encouraging political protests. Nimr al Nimr was executed on 2 January 2016, along with 46 other people, mostly citizens arrested with political charges in the 2000s.

On 20 October 2020, Human Rights Watch revealed that Saudi authorities were seeking the death penalty against eight men from Saudi Arabia who were charged with protest-related crimes. Some of the alleged crimes were committed when they were minors, between the ages of 14 and 17. One of them, charged for a non-violent crime, allegedly committed it at the age of 9. All men who were at risk of capital punishment were in pretrial detention for nearly two years.

In March 2021, Human Rights Watch claimed that a Saudi man, Abdullah al-Huwaiti, could face execution for an alleged murder and robbery he committed when he was 14 years old. Disregarding the 2020 ruling abolishing the death penalty for juveniles, al-Huwaiti faces execution following an unfair trial.

On 15 June 2021, the Ministry of Interior of Saudi Arabia announced that it executed Mustafa Hashem al-Darwish (26), who was allegedly charged for forming a terror cell and trying to carry out an armed revolt at the age of 17. He was detained from May 2015 for participating in anti-government protests. For years, he was placed in solitary confinement and was brutally beaten several times. During the trial, Al-Darwish told the court that he was tortured to confess the charges against him. Despite all the facts, he was sentenced to death and was ultimately beheaded. On 8 June 2021, Amnesty International had urged the Saudi authorities to “immediately halt all plans to execute Mustafa al-Darwish”, stating that the “death penalty is an abhorrent violation of the right to life in all circumstances”.

On 15 December 2013, another Saudi citizen, Aqil Al-Faraj, was arrested due to a discrepancy in the chassis number of the vehicle he was driving. After his arrest, several charges were brought against him, including participation in the formation of a terrorist cell affiliated with a secret armed organization that aims at armed revolt against the ruler, destabilizing internal security, killing security men, concealing arms, and drug dealing. On 1 June 2021, the Court of Appeal ratified the Taazir death sentence issued against him, which means that only the approval of the Supreme Court and the signature of the remained King before execution.

The drastic reduction in 2020 was due to a moratorium on death penalties for drug-related offenses as Saudi Arabia proposed ending the death penalty for these and other nonviolent offences. Additionally, on 26 April 2020, a royal decree ended the execution of people who were juveniles when they committed their crime. (Saudi Arabia had previously executed these people despite having signed the Convention on the Rights of the Child.) Nonetheless, there were 67 executions in 2021, more than doubling the previous year's, according to the European Saudi Organisation for Human Rights. In January 2022, at least 43 detainees, including 12 minors, were threatened with execution.

On October 14, 2026, Saudi Arabia executed two Bangladeshi nationals, Nazrul Islam Abdul Basir and Siti Akhtar, in Mecca following their conviction for committing an "immoral act" inside a mosque. The Bangladesh Consulate General in Jeddah stated that it was not notified of the executions beforehand and subsequently submitted a diplomatic note to the Saudi Ministry of Foreign Affairs requesting an explanation of the matter.

== Extrajudicial executions ==
Saudi Arabia was also responsible for the extrajudicial assassination of Saudi-American journalist Jamal Khashoggi in 2018. He was killed at the Saudi consulate in Istanbul by a squad of Saudi assassins who had been sent to Turkey with the express purpose of entrapping and murdering him.

== See also ==
- Crime in Saudi Arabia
- Law of Saudi Arabia
- Human rights in Saudi Arabia
