= 2016 Saudi Arabia mass execution =

Execution of 47 convicted terrorists

On January 2, 2016, the Kingdom of Saudi Arabia carried out a mass execution of 47 imprisoned civilians convicted of terrorism in 12 provinces in the country. Forty-three were beheaded and four were executed by firing squads. Among the 47 people killed was Shia Sheikh Nimr al-Nimr. This was the largest mass execution carried out in the kingdom since 1980. Nimr al-Nimr was sentenced to death by the Specialized Criminal Court on 15 October 2014 for "seeking 'foreign meddling' in Saudi Arabia, 'disobeying' its rulers and taking up arms against the security forces". His execution was condemned by religious and political figures and human rights groups. The Saudi government said the body would not be handed over to the family. Al-Nimr was very critical of the Saudi government, and had called for free elections in Saudi Arabia.

== Response ==
The mass execution sparked mass protests across the Middle East, during which protesters in Tehran and Mashhad burned part of the Saudi diplomatic missions, and the Saudi embassy in the Iraqi capital Baghdad was attacked by protesters and a rocket. The embassies were empty during the attacks. In response, the Saudi state severed ties with Iran. The Iranian government condemned the embassy attack in Iran.

== List of executed people ==
Out of the total forty-seven people executed, forty-five were Saudis, one was Egyptian, and one was Chadian.

- Ameen Mohammed Abdullah Al Aqala (Saudi)
- Anwar Abdulrahman Khalil Al-Najjar (Saudi)
- Badr bin Mohammed bin Abdullah Al-Badr (Saudi)
- Bandar Mohammed bin Abdulrahman Al-Ghaith (Saudi)
- Hassan Hadi bin Shuja'a Al-Masareer (Saudi)
- Hamad bin Abdullah bin Ibrahim Al-Humaidi (Saudi)
- Khalid Mohammed Ibrahim Al-Jarallah (Saudi)
- Ridha Abdulrahman Khalil Al-Najjar (Saudi)
- Saad Salamah Hameer (Saudi)
- Salah bin Saeed bin Abdulraheem Al-Najjar (Saudi)
- Salah bin Abdulrahman bin Mohammed Al Hussain (Saudi)
- Saleh bin Abdulrahman bin Ibrahim Al-Shamsan (Saudi)
- Saleh bin Ali bin Saleh Al-Juma'ah (Saudi)
- Adel bin Saad bin Jaza' Al-Dhubaiti (Saudi)
- Adel Mohammed Salem Abdullah Yamani (Saudi)
- Abduljabbar bin Homood bin Abdulaziz Al-Tuwaijri (Saudi)
- Abdulrahman Dhakheel Faleh Al-Faleh (Saudi)
- Abdullah Sayer Moawadh Massad Al-Mohammadi (Saudi)
- Abdullah bin Saad bin Mozher Shareef (Saudi)
- Abdullah Saleh Abdulaziz Al-Ansari (Saudi)
- Abdullah Abdulaziz Ahmed Al-Muqrin (Saudi)
- Abdullah Musalem Hameed Al-Raheef (Saudi)
- Abdullah bin Mua'ala bin A'li (Saudi)
- Abdulaziz Rasheed bin Hamdan Al-Toaili'e (Saudi)
- Abdulmohsen Hamad bin Abdullah Al-Yahya (Saudi)
- Isam Khalaf Mohammed Al-Mothri'e (Saudi)
- Ali Saeed Abdullah Al Ribeh (Saudi)
- Ghazi Mohaisen Rashed (Saudi)
- Faris Ahmed Jama'an Al Showail (Saudi)
- Fikri Ali bin Yahya Faqih (Saudi)
- Fahd bin Ahmed bin Hanash Al Zamel (Saudi)
- Fahd Abdulrahman Ahmed Al-Buraidi (Saudi)
- Fahd Ali Ayedh Al Jubran (Saudi)
- Majed Ibrahim Ali Al-Mughainem (Saudi)
- Majed Moeedh Rashed (Saudi)
- Mishaal bin Homood bin Juwair Al-Farraj (Saudi)
- Mohammed Abdulaziz Mohammed Al-Muharib (Saudi)
- Mohammed Ali Abdulkarim Suwaymil (Saudi)
- Mohammed Fathi Abula'ti Al-Sayed (Egyptian)
- Mohammed bin Faisal bin Mohammed Al-Shioukh (Saudi)
- Mostafa Mohammed Altaher Abkar (Chadian)
- Moaidh Mufreh Ali Al Shokr (Saudi)
- Nasser Ali Ayedh Al Jubran (Saudi)
- Naif Saad Abdullah Al-Buraidi (Saudi)
- Najeeb bin abdulaziz bin Abdullah Al-Bohaiji (Saudi)
- Nimr Baqr al-Nimr (Saudi)
- Nimr Sehaj Zeid Al-Kraizi (Saudi)

== See also ==
- Capital punishment in Saudi Arabia
- 2019 Saudi Arabia mass execution
- 2022 Saudi Arabia mass execution
