= Awad bin Mohammed al-Qarni =

Islamic author and scholar

Awad bn Muhammed al-Qarni
- عوض بن محمد القرني
- Born: January 1, 1957 (age 69); Saudi Arabia
- Education: Imam Muhammad ibn Saud Islamic University

Dr. Awad ibn Muhammed al-Qarni (Arabic: عوض بن محمد القرني, also spelt al-Qarnee and Quranī, born 1959), is a Saudi Islamic Muslim scholar, author, and activist. He is known for his criticism of secularism and modernity and advocacy of conservative Islamic views. He was arrested in 2017 on charges of Promoting extremist ideas. In January 2023, it was announced that Saudi prosecutors were seeking the death penalty in his case.

== Early life, education, and career ==
al-Qarni was born in 1957 (1376 AH) in the al Qarn governate of the Asir region. He received a PhD in Islamic law from the Imam Muhammed ibn Saud University. He later worked as a professor at the Abha branch of the university and at the King Khalid University. al Qarni is also a trainer in neuro-linguistic programming and a member of the International Federation of Neuro-Linguistic Programming. Dr. Wyatt Woodsmall, the president of the International Federation of Neuro-Linguistic Programming converted to Islam as a result of conversations with al Qarni.

== Views ==
al Qarni is most well known for his criticism of secularism in modernity, most notably in his book "Modernity in the Balance of Islam." This book was highly influential on the Sahwa movement which included other Saudi scholars such as Safar al Hawali.

He was one of 26 signatories of a statement calling for jihad against the American-led occupation of Iraq during the Iraq war. He argued that the global war on terror was "fabricated" by the West to colonize Muslim countries and destroy their way of life.

== His Views on Women's Rights ==
In Al-Qarni's Words "I'm Committed to fighting the unveiling and immodesty called for by Westernizers and pledged to demand the veil, purity, chastity and jealousy."

== Criticism and controversy ==
Saudi state-backed media has described al Qarni as a "preacher of hate" and accused him of using TV interviews to "glorify terrorism, spread conspiracy theories and launch tirades against the West."

At one point, he was involved in a public argument with a prominent Houthi figure who accused him of plotting to assassinate the Saudi king.

== Arrest and prosecution ==
In 2017, al Qarni was banned by a Saudi court from using Twitter, where he had more than 2 million followers. He was arrested later that year on charges of using social media to spread materials subversive to the Saudi government. Riyadh's Specialised Criminal Court convicted him for spreading content on Twitter which "could jeopardise public order and provoke public opinion" and "could affect the relationship of the people with the leadership, and the relationship of Saudi Arabia with other countries."

His son, Nasser al Qarni, fled to the UK in the aftermath of his father's arrest. al Qarni's son described his arrest in 2017 as especially violent, with more than 100 armed officers surrounding his house.

== Written works ==
- Human Rights in Islam
- Modernity in the Balance of Islam
- Provisions of Freedom in Islam
- Provisions of Testimony in Islam
- The Issue of Palestine in the Balance of Islam
