= Trad Al-Fayez =

Jordanian politician

His Excellency Trad Mithqal Sattam Al-Fayez
- Born: 31 December 1937
- Education: The University of Oklahoma
- Occupation: Politician
- Children: 6
- Father: Mithqal Al Fayez
- Relatives: Sattam Al-Fayez (Grandfather); Akef Al-Fayez; Sami Al-Fayez

Trad Mithqal Al-Fayez (Arabic: طراد مثقال الفايز, Trad Al Fayiz; 31 December 1937 – 11 September 2024) is a Jordanian politician born in Amman, Jordan. He was the minister of agriculture, an ambassador of Jordan to multiple countries, and a member of the Jordanian senate.

== Early life and personal life ==
Al-Fayez was born in Amman in 1937 to Sheikh Mithqal Al-Fayez and Adul Khayr. He graduated from The University of Oklahoma in 1965 with a bachelor's degree in Political Science. In 1967, following the Arab defeat in the Six-Day War, a wave of Palestinian refugees from the West Bank were to be resettled in Jordan, Trad, alongside his brothers Akef and Talal donated 130,000 square meters of land in the main urban center of Al-Jizah to host the refugees where the Talbieh Camp stands today. Trad was the last surviving son of Mithqal, dying on the night of 11 September 2024. A three-day funeral service was held in the Mithqal Pasha Al-Fayez Diwan, and was attended by a wide range of dignitaries and royalty from various parts of the Arab World.

== Political career ==
- Minister of Agriculture of Jordan, 2002–2003
- Member of the Jordanian Senate, 2001–2003
- Member of the Jordanian Senate, 2003–2005
- Jordanian ambassador to Egypt, 1998
- Jordanian permanent representative to the Arab League, 1998
- Jordanian ambassador to Qatar, 1993–1997
- Jordanian ambassador to Lebanon,1997–1998
- Secretary general of the Ministry of Media, 1988
- Media advisor to the prime minister, 1986–1988

== Honours ==
=== National ===
- Jordan:
  - Grand Cordon of the Order of the Star of Jordan
  - Grand Cordon of the Order of Independence

=== Foreign ===
- Qatar:
  - Order of Independence

== See also ==
- Mithqal Al Fayez
- Al-Fayez
