= Fendi Al-Fayez =

Sheikh of the Bani Sakher (1800–1879)

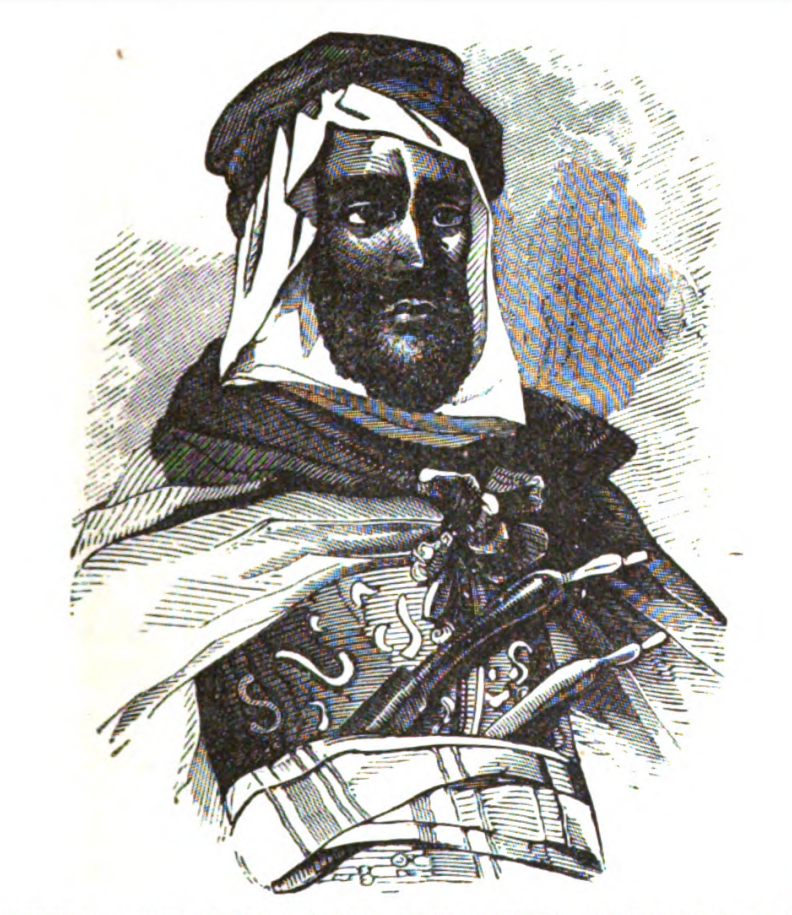
- Fendi Al-Fayez c. 1873
- Died: April 14, 1879 (aged 78)
- Resting place: Abila, Jordan
- Other names: Fendi el Faiz, Fendy el Feis
- Occupation: Arabian Leader
- Years active: 1820–1879
- Children: Sattam Al-Fayez; Talal Al-Fayez
- Relatives: Mithqal Al Fayez (Grandson); Akef Al-Fayez (Great Grandson)

Fendi bin Abbas bin Awad Al Fayez (Arabic: فندي بن عباس بن عواد الفايز; c. 1800–1879) was an Arab tribal leader and a sovereign Emir from the Al-Fayez family who was the paramount Sheikh of the Bani Sakher clan from the 1820s up until his death. He is widely regarded as the most influential figure in the Bani Sakher, dubbed the Old King east of the Jordan and one of the most powerful tribal figures in Arabia in the 19th century. Fendi's first documented tribal battle was as early as 1820 when he was just twenty years old.

By the end of his reign he expanded his tribe's territory to cover the ancient Kingdom of Moab, Ammon, and the Bashan, including Madaba, Um Al Amad, Al Jeezah, Al Qastal, Jibāl al Lafīfah, parts of Ajloun, Dhiban, and other areas in South Amman and in Ma'an. He would also collect Jizya in Marj Ibn Amer and Tiberias and would stay there for vacation in his domain. In addition to his own vast lands, Fendi and his 4,500-strong army vassalized all of Al Karak and Al Tafilah directly and large parts of northern Palestine such as Al Galilee through Aqil Agha to become the most powerful independent ruler in the region since the Ottoman expansion of Selim I in 1517. In addition to becoming a guardian of pilgrims, he was also dubbed The Old King by locals and explorers alike in reference to his long reign.

Fendi had 14 sons: Satm, Sattam, Talal, Haza', S'fouq, Muhammad, Barjas, Nayef, Farhan, Jrooh, Hayel, Sahen, Saleh, and Jid'an. He was succeeded by his son Satm Al-Fayez, who was immediately faced with a schism in his family following Fendi's death. Satm's contested role would end with his death two years later, to be succeeded by Fendi's chosen heir and Satm's younger brother, Sattam.

Fendi's descendants would continue to lead the Al-Fayez family and the Bani Sakher.

== Early life and family ==
Fendi was likely born southeast of Umm ar-Rasas, which was the capital of the Bani Sakher emirate prior to Fendi's moving it to Al-Jizah. Al-Jizah, often called by its ancient Roman name of Ziza or Zizya, has been on the northern end of the Al-Fayez's dominion until the subjugation and overthrow of many of the southern Balqa troops early into the 1800s where everything as far as Jerash came into the Emirate that Fendi would inherit. His grandfather Awad was the paramount Sheikh of the Bani Sakher, who likely served in that role from the 1770s till the early 19th century. Awad's eldest son, Fendi, died young and had no sons. Awad was also the paramount Sheikh and was most likely the head of the Bani Sakher forces against the Napoleonic invasion of Palestine. His second eldest, Abbas named Fendi after his late elder brother. Abbas became the paramount Sheikh after Awad, with his younger brother Sulayman as his right hand man. Abbas's only son was Fendi which placed him in a unique position to inherit much more than his first and second cousins, later helping him in the centralization of the tribe.

== Appearance ==
Fendi's appearance has been described by multiple authors and guests from Europe who entertained him. Fendi is described as an intimidating man with "an iron-beard, strongly marked features, fine and prominent nose, large liquid black eyes, and a rather surly expression of countenance". He carried with him his scimitar and pistol, both engraved with silver. Fendi also had on him a "Damascus blade that he kept with care, also a coat of mail, which probably dated from early Saracenic times," i.e. they could have originated from as early as the 8th century AD.

== Bani Sakher under Fendi ==
It's widely regarded that under Fendi, Bani Sakher experienced the fastest growth in terms of population, land, and wealth. In 1810 the Beni Sakher were able to defend against a joint attack from Sulayman Pasha of Damascus, Sheikh Hamoud Al-Saleh of the Adwan, and the Ruwala. It's unlikely that Fendi was present in this battle, however it marked the beginning of a long history of victories that led to the Beni Sakher expansion of the 19th century Fendi was a large contributor to. In the 1810s, John L. Burckhardt reported that the Beni Sakher's forces amounted to around 500 men. In 1863, Henry B. Tristram saw the Beni Sakher camped in the Ghor region, his description puts them at many times the figure that Burchkardt explained around 35 years prior. Tristram wrote:

“When, in 1863, they encamped in the Ghor [the Jordan Valley], just before their raid on the plain of Esdraelon, their tents, like the Midianites’, covered the ground for miles, far as the eye could reach from the Mount of Beisan, and in a week there was not a green blade to be seen, where before the arrival of these locusts one stood knee-deep in the rank herbage.”

In 1877 this was estimated again to be at 4,500.

Fendi would also focus heavily on trade, he reportedly was arranging the sale of camels for the haj, and was earning £1,500 a year from selling or hiring camels.

In addition to ruling the majority of modern-day Jordan and Palestine, Fendi was also described as the chief sheikh of the Bashan Arabs in Syria, testifying to his influence in south Syria as well and contesting with the Ottoman's rule of Arab lands.

== Guardian of the Pilgrims ==
The Hijaz Railway.

Under Fendi, the Bani Sakher tribe became the guardians of the Muslim pilgrims to Mecca. Fendi would muster 700 camel-men to protect the pilgrims from Hauran till 6 days south of Al-Kerak. On Camel this journey would've covered around 260 km (~162 miles), and covers the distance from the Mount Hauran till beyond the borders of modern-day Jordan, finally reaching Halat Ammar in modern-day Saudi Arabia. Fendi would be responsible for ensuring the pilgrim's safety from the early 1860s till 1869, then again from 1872 till his death. This honor is a result of Fendi's good relationship with the Ottoman State, Reshid Pasha contracted with Fendi to protect and provide for the pilgrims throughout this distance. This has added to the Fendi and his family's wealth alongside their camel trading business. The family would continue to be a guardian of the pilgrims up until the opening of the Hijaz Railway in the late 1910s.

== Death ==
On his way back from Nablus, Fendi fell ill, and died inside the territory of the Adwan tribe. Although the Bani Sakhr and the Adwan were enemies at the time, Arabian customs of respect where uphold by his adversaries and Fendi Al-Fayez was buried in Abila, at the junction of Wady Rameh and Wady el Kefrein. After Fendi died, his eight sons were conflicted on who will rule after him. His eight sons have split the family and tribe, with one, consisting of mostly the older brothers allied with the Adwan, and the other under Satm allied with the Anazeh and the Ottomans. The tribe eventually reunited in under 1881 after Satm's death in a skirmish with the Adwan. Sheikh Sattam, who Fendi has already given him much of his responsibilities prior to his death became the Sheikh of the Bani Sakhr.

== Tomb ==
His tomb was modeled after Roman Sarcophagi which how Arab Bedouins honor famous heroes, and its dimensions are 3 m (10 ft) tall by 3m long by 2m (6'6 ft) wide. The tribe mark of the Fayez family is shown on the west end of the tomb. The tomb was made so that Fendi was lying on his right side, and facing Mecca. The tomb area is enclosed by a quadrangular with rounded corners, It measured 5.2 m (17 ft) by 4.6m (15 feet), and the wall is around half a meter (1'6 ft) tall. On the sides of the tomb, a crutch headed sticks that have an exact resemblance of one of the scepters of Osiris, a sword, coffee cups, and other symbols can be seen on the tomb walls.

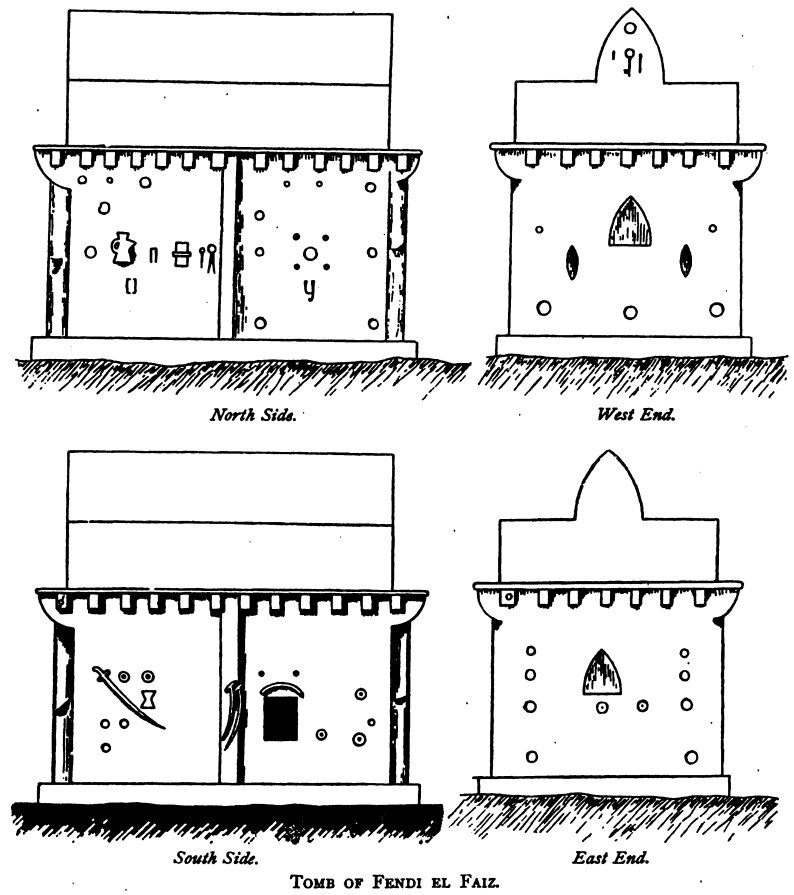
Tomb of Fendi

== See also ==
- Sattam Al-Fayez
- Mithqal Al Fayez
- Akef Al-Fayez
- Faisal Al Fayez
- Bani Sakher
- Al-Fayez
