= Sami Al-Fayez =

Jordanian politician

His Excellency Sami Mithqal Sattam Al-Fayez
- Born: 1932
- Died: November 18, 2012
- Resting place: Umm Al Amad, Jordan
- Occupation(s): Tribal Sheikh and Politician
- Years active: 1998-2012
- Children: Habis Al-Fayez; Hayel Al-Fayez; Many more
- Relatives: Akef Al-Fayez (Brother); Trad Al-Fayez (Brother); Faisal Al-Fayez (Nephew); Amer Al-Fayez (Nephew)

Sami Mithqal Al-Fayez (Arabic: سامي مثقال الفايز, Sami Al Fayiz; 1932 – 18 November 2012) was a Jordanian senator and Arabian tribal figure who was the paramount sheikh the Bani Sakher.

== Family and early life ==
Sami was born to Sheikh Mithqal bin Sattam and Sat'a Hatmal Al-Zaben in 1932. He was Mithqal's sixth son and the second son from Sat'aa after Ali. Sami grew up in a traditional nomadic setting and culture, rather than the city like his brothers Akef and Zayd, and therefore was very familiar with tribal affairs and culture. At only 25 years old, he was appointed a tribal judge by King Hussein.

== Political career ==
Al-Fayez became a senator twice, on 23/11/1993 and on 16/5/1998. He was appointed to the office of Sheikh of Sheikhs of the Bani Sakher after his brothers death by King Hussein. His last political act was organizing and hosting on the 13th of November, 2012, one of the largest tribal conferences in Jordanian history to reaffirm and cement the tribe's support towards the Hashemite Monarchy during the Arab Spring. He maintained his role as a judge and tribal mediator until his death.

== See also ==
- Mithqal Al-Fayez
- Akef Al-Fayez
- Faisal Al-Fayez
- Al-Fayez
