= Hala bint Abdullah bin Abdulaziz Al Saud =

Member of the Saudi royal family

Hala bint Abdullah bin Abdulaziz Al Saud (1974/1975 – September 2021) was a member of the Saudi royal family. She was the daughter of King Abdullah bin Abdulaziz Al Saud. She was held captive against her will in a Jeddah compound by the Saudi regime. The Saudi regime announced her death in September 2021 without any further explanation.

Hala was born to Alanoud Al-Fayez, a Jordanian noblewoman. Her mother married King Abdullah when she was fifteen years old and he was about fifty years old.

Hala ended up on bad terms with her father when she publicized human rights abuses that she witnessed at a Saudi hospital. She also spoke in favor of women's rights. This led the Saudi regime to briefly jail her.

News about her imprisonment was made public in 2014. Her mother, who was an exile living in London, United Kingdom, begged the United Nations to intervene. After her father, King Abdullah, died in 2015 and Mohammed bin Salman became de facto ruler of Saudi Arabia, Princess Hala became unable to relay information about herself to the world. According to physicians interviewed by the New Yorker, Princess Hala was regularly dosed with a combination of Valium, Ativan, Xanax, and Ambien to immobilize her. The Saudi regime also provided ample supplies of alcohol, cocaine, and amphetamines to Hala and the other captive princesses.
