= Mohammad Enad Al-Fayez =

Jordanian politician

- محمد عناد الفايز

Member of The Jordanian Parliament
- In office 18 January 2023 – 10 December 2020

Personal details
- Born: 12 March 1968 (age 58) Amman, Jordan
- Party: Independent

Mohammad Enad Al-Fayez (Arabic: محمد عناد الفايز) (born 18 March 1968 in Amman) is a Jordanian politician and former member of the Jordanian Parliament who was dismissed from parliament following his message to Prince Mohammed Bin Salman that requested that he suspend aid to Jordan until more anti-corruption measures were in place.

== Early life ==
Al-Fayez was born in Amman in 1968 to Sheikh Enad Mohammad Al-Fayez and Sheikha Sultana Bint Mithqal Al-Fayez. His maternal grandfather is Mithqal Pasha Al-Fayez. He is a cousin of former Jordanian Prime Minister Faisal Al-Fayez. He earned a degree in political science from the University of Jordan and completed his master's degree in International Relations in the U.K.

== Career ==
In 2020 Al-Fayez became an MP on 10 December 2020. He lost a race against Abdulmunim Ouddat for the position of Speaker of the Lower House, earning 26 out of 115 votes.

In 2023, Al-Fayez urged Crown Prince of Saudi Arabia, Mohammed Bin Salman, to suspend aid to Jordan, claiming that "this aid only goes to a corrupt class that is getting richer at the expense of the proud Jordanian people". After his comments, Al-Fayez resigned his position, despite many Jordanians asking him to stay. On 18 January he was expelled from the Lower House with 92 votes out of 110 supporting this decision, officially for "disfiguring the kingdom's reputation".

Al-Fayez chose to donate his entire salary as an MP, which he was accused of "unjustly receiving financial allocations during his absence from Parliament".

== See also ==
- Al-Fayez
