= Al-Fayez =

Jordanian political family

House of ِAl-Fayez الفايز
- Noble House
- Parent house: Al Twaga (1377; 649 years ago) of the Bani Sakher of Banu Tayy
- Country: Jordan
- Etymology: Fayez Al-Tayy, considered the founder of the house
- Origin: Arabia
- Founded: c. 1610; 416 years ago
- Founder: Fayez Al-Tayy
- Current head: Faisal Al-Fayez
- Titles: Conferred by the House of Osman: Beylerbey; Emir; Pasha; Agha; Sheikh of Sheikhs of Bani Sakher; Conferred by the House of Hashim: Sheikh of Sheikhs of Bani Sakher; Sheikh
- Connected families: House of Saud; House of Shaalan; Al Khayr Family; Ruwallah

The House of Fayez (Arabic: الفايز or, colloquially: Al-Fayez, Alfayez, Al Fayez, Al Faiz, Al Fayiz) is a noble sheikhly Jordanian family that heads the major Jordanian clan Bani Sakher. The family's influence and prominence in the region was at its ultimate under Fendi Al-Fayez, who led the family in the 1840s and gradually became the leader of the entire Bani Sakher. Fendi would rule large parts of Jordan and Palestine, including the ancient Kingdoms of Moab and Ammon, and parts of modern-day Saudi Arabia until the late 1860s when a series of battles with the Ottoman Empire decreased the family's resources and claimed a portion of its holdings. After Fendi, his young son Sattam led the tribe in a push to cultivate the lands and live a more sedentary lifestyle, then under Mithqal Al fayez as a permanent political power in modern Jordan. The family was the largest owner of land in Jordan and owned portions of modern day Palestine, and Mithqal was the single largest owner of private land in the kingdom in 1922. The Al-Fayez family is active in Jordanian and Arabian politics and is currently headed by former Prime Minister Faisal Al-Fayez.

== History ==
According to ethnographic and historical records compiled by Frederick Peake and Alois Musil, the origins of the Al-Fayez family Trace back to the Bani Sakhr confederation, specifically from the Tuwaqa Branch, who migrated from Al Ula In the Northern Hejaz. While early constituent branches like the Dahamshe initially established themselves along the desert fringes of Al-Balqa, the leadership structure stabilized during the early-to-mid 17th century under Fayez, a descendent of Tweiq, from whom the modern family takes its name. Fayez consolidated the political and economic influence of the Al-Touqah branch. Under his patriarchate and the subsequent leadership of his sons Mohammad, Qa'dan, and I'dbeys, the family accumulated significant livestock wealth and secured control over strategic deep-desert watering stations, including Bir Bayir and Al-Azraq. This territorial and economic consolidation allowed the Al-Fayez lineage to systematically integrate the fragmented components of the Bani Sakhr and establish a centralized leadership framework over the confederation prior to the 18th century.

=== 18th century ===
In 1742, Sheikh Qa'dan Al-Fayez, the progenitor of the Qa'dan branch of the Al-Fayez family and the grandson of Fayez Al-Tay, was invited to support the Ottoman state in Sieging Tiberias. Although the siege was a failure, the Beni Sakher were still thanked by an invite from As'ad Pasha al-Azm to escort the Hajj Caravans. In 1757, the Ottoman state failed to pay the Beni Sakher for their services, this coupled with the drought of 1756 has led to the infamous raid in 1757 led by Qa'dan. The raid's casualties were in the tens of thousands, including Musa Pasha and the sister of the sultan.

By the 1780s the Bani Sakher tribe was under the leadership of the sons and grandsons of brother I'dbeys, Qa'dan, and Mohammad Al-Fayez. Awad bin Thiab, grandson of Mohammad was at considered by the Ottomans as the face of the tribe and its paramount sheikh, arranging and actively participating in the logistics of Al Hajj caravans and trading. His cousins Sa'd bin Qa'dan and Rabah bin I'dbeys were more focused on tribal raids and regional warfare. During the French invasion of Palestine in 1799, the Beni Sakhr tribe, mobilized crossed the Jordan River to combat Napoleon's forces of 13,000 troops at the Battle of Esdraelon. It was during this dramatic confrontation that Rabah, supported by Emir Awad, famously remarked that he "could not swim in hell with a stick" when contrasting his traditional cavalry lances with the overwhelming force of the French artillery infantry squares.

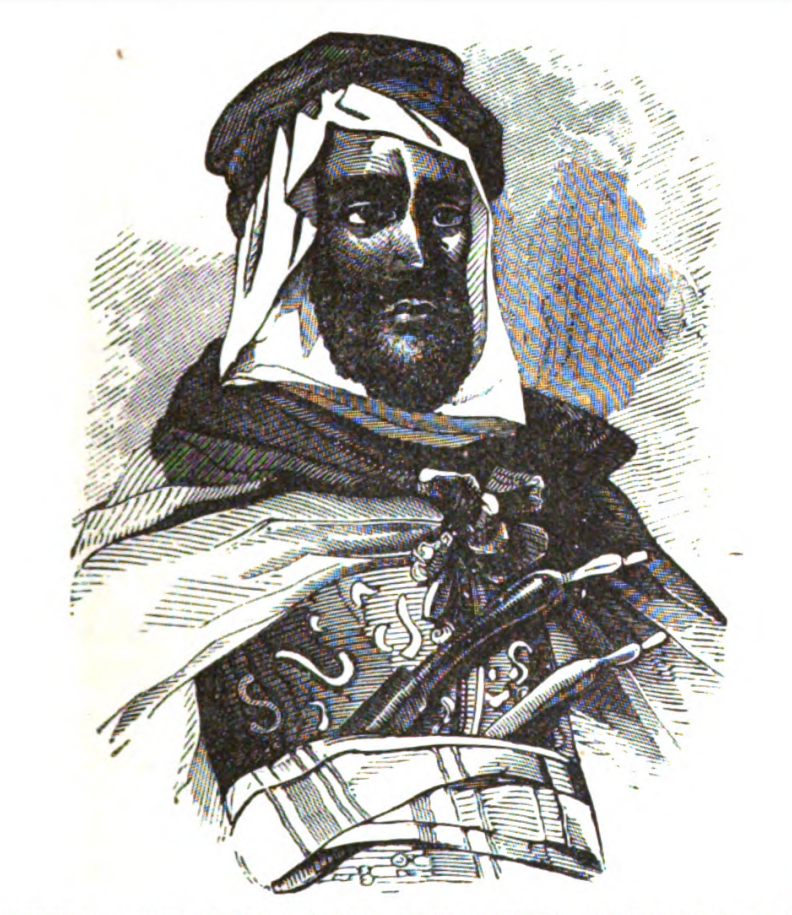
Prince Fendi Al-Fayez in the 1870s

=== 19th century ===
In November 1804, during a logistical crisis facing the annual Mecca pilgrimage (Hajj al-Sharif), the Ottoman Damascus Eyalet under Governor Abdullah Pasha al-Azm contracted the autonomous Bani Sakher tribe to secure the Transjordanian transport corridors. As recorded in the Jerusalem Sharia Court Registers (Sijillat al-Mahkama al-Shar'iyya), the provincial government issued a high-priority financial transfer (hawala) of 32,000 Ottoman piasters to the paramount leader Sheikh Awad bin Thiab Al-Fayez. This expenditure commissioned the Al-Fayez leadership to transport 1,000 camel-loads of barley to the imperial garrison at Ma'an Castle (Qal'at Ma'an), safeguarding the pilgrimage from starvation and tribal raids. A historiographical contract highlights the deep sovereign interdependence between the empire and local authorities. By addressing Awad with the elite courtly honorific «مفخر المشايخ الموقرين» ("The Pride of the Honored Sheikhs"), the Sublime Porte officially codified the noble, paramount status of the Al-Fayez lineage at this stage as the supreme gatekeepers of the frontier decades before 19th-century European expeditions began documenting the region.

In 1820, Fendi Al-Fayez, a grandson of Sheikh Awad bin Thiab led in battle for the first recorded time, and by mid century he was the paramount sheikh and revered throughout Arabia.

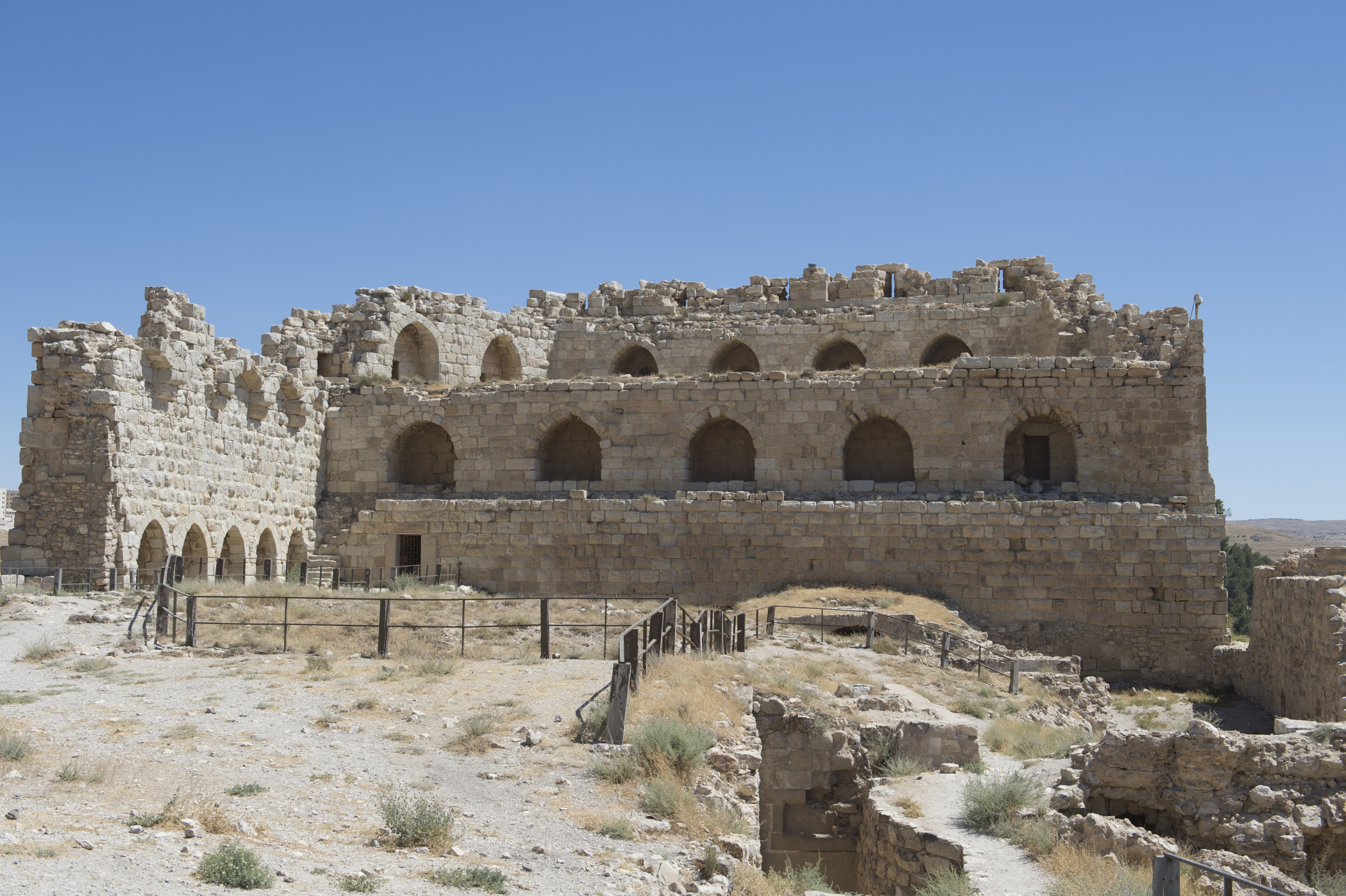
The Kerak Castle which was sieged by Shleish Al Bakhit Al Fayez

One of the most famous conflicts that they had was against the Majalli family in 1863 and was documented by the Italian explorer Carlo Claudio Camillo Guarmani in his book that Northern Nejd. The Al Tafilah villagers, who were subject to Mohammad Al-Majalli, paying yearly tributes to him, were discontented with the recent negligence of the Majalis in protecting the villagers. The Tafilah villagers were gathered by Abdullah Al-Huara, the chief of the Tafilah, and agreed to renounce vassalage and replace the tribute with an annual gift as homage instead. The Al-Majali chief was discontent with this and was ready to force the Tafilah's to become their vassals again, but was stopped by the Bani Sakher headed by Fendi, where Fendi sent Shlash Al-Bakhit Al-Fayez to ensure the contract between them where both parties comprised to avoid bloodshed.

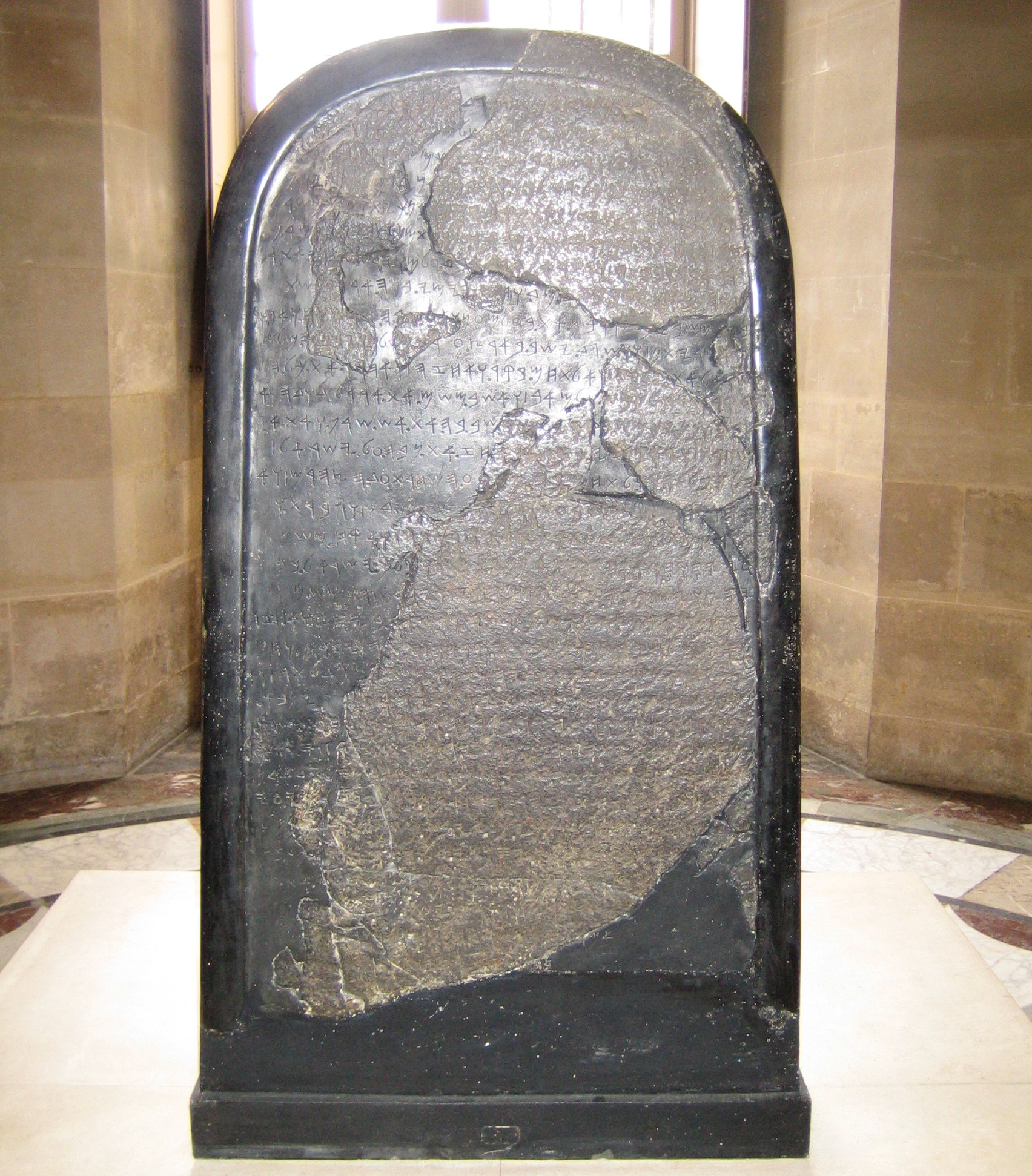
The Moabite Stone, first revealed to the western world by Sattam bin Fendi

However, in January 1864, Al-Majali again decided to attack and announce himself the master of the Tafilah, and was met with an immediate declaration of war from Fendi himself. Shlash Al-Bakhit was successful in leading an attack against Qoblan Al-Mkheisen who was appointed by Al-Majali to oversee the Tafilah. Fendi shortly after sent 200 who met a force of 2000 riflemen on dromedaries. However, during the long standstill, the people of Al-Kerak were virtually under siege and were quickly running out of food and becoming increasingly ill-content, sensing this, Al-Majali secretly went to Fendi in the night to personally declare his surrender to him and agreed to pay reparations to all those wronged in the conflict, including reinstating Al-Huara's son as the Chief of Al-Tafilah.

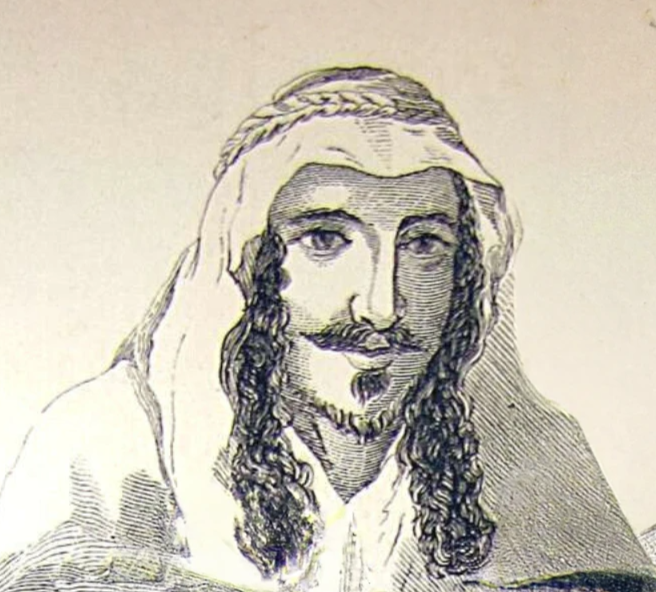
A young Emir Sattam bin Fendi in 1848

In 1868, an Anglican missionary, F.A Klein, was accompanied by Sattam bin Fendi on Fendi's orders to show him the Mesha Stele, which was previously unknown to the western world. The stone has been dated to 840BC and described a war between the ancient Kingdom of Moab and the ancient Kingdom of Israel. Today the stone can be found in the Louvre Museum, Paris.

In 1879, Fendi, on the way back from Nablus as part of his camel trade had died from illness in the Lands of the Adwan tribe, in the Al-Ghor Jordan Valley region. His burial and mausoleum are located at the final junction of the Valleys of Al-Kafrein and Al-Ramah, exactly four kilometers east of the Baptismal Site of Jesus.

A dispute occurred shortly after over the succession of Fendi, between his second eldest Satm and his chosen successor Sattam. The feud lasted until 1881, and ended with Satm's death and Sattam being recognized by both the Arabs and the Ottomans. He received his beyship from the latter, and shortly followed the creation of the new administrative region of Al-Jizah with Sattam as its first governor . An incident between the Majalis of Karak and Henry B. Tristram that same year was solved with Sattam reasserting the Al-Fayez clan's influence and dominance over the Karak region.

Sattam's focus during his rule was on safeguarding trading routes going through his regions from bandits and settling new populations from Palestine and Egypt into Jordan to increase the manpower for agriculture. The most notable example of this was the settling of many Gazans such as the Abu Zaid family into the Sahab region

=== 20th Century ===
After Sattam's death in 1891, another succession crisis unfolded with Sattam's son Fayez bin Sattam vying to succeed his father, in opposition to his uncle Talal bin Fendi. Talal was eventually recognized as Sheikh of Sheikhs of the Beni Sakher. The Ottomans invited both Fayez and Talal to Istanbul to arbitrate a successful reconciliation. During his visit, Talal was conferred the title of Pasha with a monthly salary and would later become Beylerbey. During his 18-year reign, Talal enjoyed friendly relations with the Ottomans during his last years with strains over the construction of the Hijaz Railway which not only crossed through many of the family's private lands but would also destroy their income as protectors of Hajj Caravans and providers of camels and supplies. Talal negotiated with the Ottomans, where they agreed to keep paying for the Hajj Caravans, and also pay the tribe for the protection of the Hijaz Railway. By 1908, Talal stopped receiving payments from the Ottomans, and his trip to Damascus to complain coincided with the beginning of the Young Turk revolution.

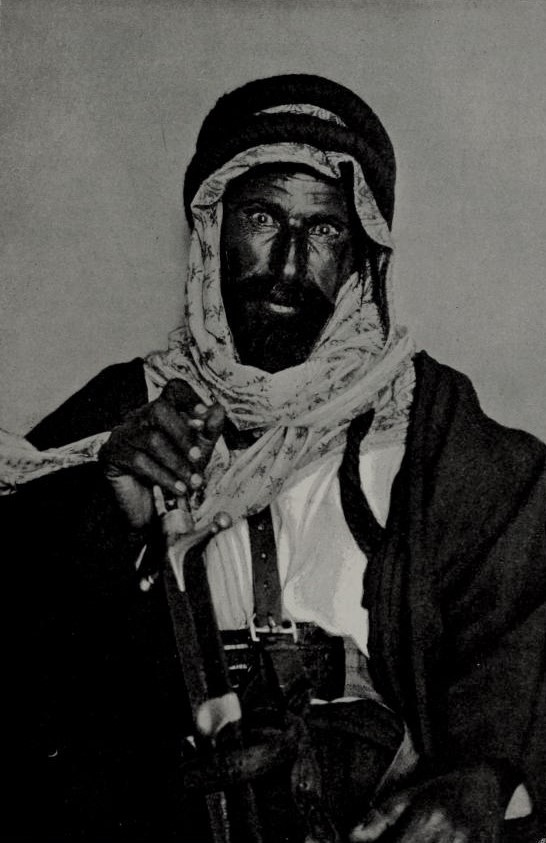
Beylerbey Talal Al-Fayez, 1907

Talal would be succeeded by Fawaz bin Sattam in 1909. Fawaz who was recognized by the Ottomans as Sheikh of Shiekhs and would act as an official representative of the empire, but would face a rebellious Mithqal who challenged Ottoman authority over cultivated fertile lands. By then, the new Ottoman administration was enacting new conscription laws that even included tribesmen. Mithqal dropped his claim over the land after peaceful negotiations between the two parties and a settlement of 200 ewes to Mithqal. By 1913, Mithqal would act as the military commander of the Bani Sakher and would share a portion of the leadership of the Beni Sakher with his brother Fawaz.

After Fawaz's death in 1917, his son Mashour who had had a Damascene education would succeed his father. Mashour was recognized by the Ottomans as Sheikh of Shiekhs, and Mithqal who was older was compensated by the Ottomans by the title of Pasha to become the last real Pasha in Jordan with a title sanctioned by the Sultan. In 1920, Mashour was recognized as the Governor of Jiza and would serve in the position till his death in a inter-tribal battle in 1921. Mithqal who welcomed then Abdullah bin Hussein in Jiza, was recognized as Sheikh of Sheikhs of the Beni Sakher in the new Emirate of Transjordan with no opposition.

In 1923, during the Adwan rebellion, Mithqal Al-Fayez led the Beni Sakher against the Adwan and in full support of Emir Abdullah, with the result being the defeat of the Adwan forces with some taken as prisoners and exiled.

In may of 1926, Emir Abdullah brokered both peace and an agreement of non-aggression between the Bani Sakher and the Huwaytat, signed on by Mithqal Al-Fayez and Hamad bin Jazi. This was followed with the larger Al-Ramadi conference in Iraq in 1927, where Mithqal and heads of the major tribes of Jordan and Iraq such as the paramount Sheikh of Shammar Aqil Al-Yawar Al-Jarba and the paramount Sheikh of the Anazzah Mahrouth bin Fahad bin Hathal, agreed to cease the ancient practice of extra-tribal warefare "Ghazw". Mithqal was also a signatory and a broker of a similar agreement between Syrian tribes and Jordanian tribes in 1928 which ended the tradition in the whole of North Arabia.

=== 21st Century - present ===
In 2004, H.E Faisal Al-Fayez becomes the Prime Minister of Jordan, and later in 2005, also becomes the Head of the Royal Hashemite Court.

In 2005, H.E Eid Al-Fayez becomes Minister of Interior after the 2005 Amman Bombings and would serve until 2009.

In 2008, H.E Amer Talal Al-Fayez became the Head of Royal Protocol at the Royal Hashemite Court and would stay until 2018.

In 2010, H.E Faisal Al-Fayez is elected the Speaker of the House of Representatives of Jordan.

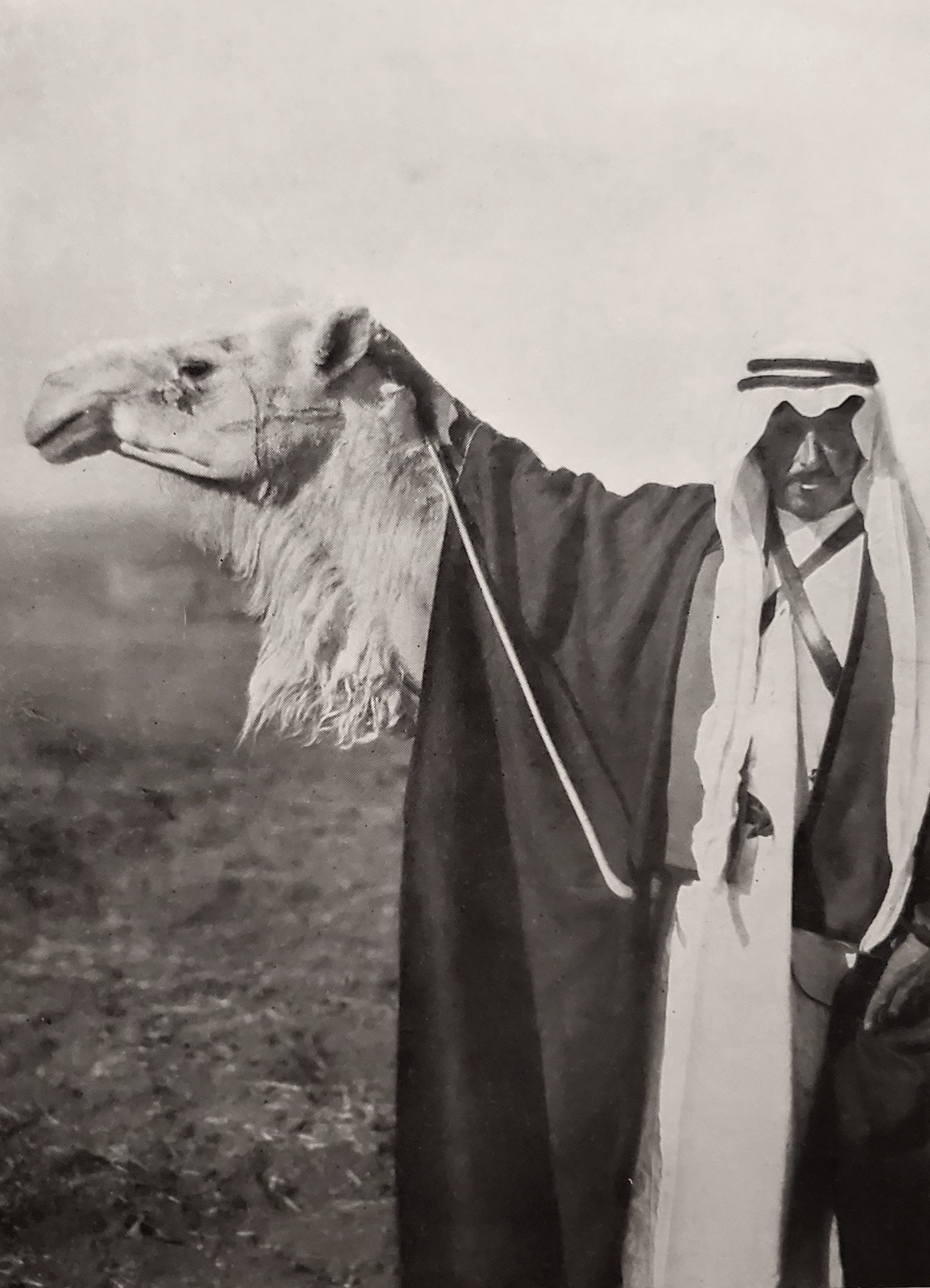
Paramount Sheikh Mithqal Pasha Al-Fayez, 1925

In 2012, H.E Sami Al-Fayez holds one of the largest tribal conferences in Jordanian history to reaffirm and cement the tribe's support towards the Hashemite Monarchy during the Arab Spring.

Later in 2012, H.E Faisal Al-Fayez becomes the undisputed Paramount Sheikh of the Beni Sakher after the passing of his uncle Sami.

In October 2015, Faisal Al-Fayez was appointed President of the Senate, becoming the first person in Jordanian history to have served as Prime Minister, Speaker of the House of Representatives, President of the Senate, and Chief of the Royal Hashemite Court.

In 2018, a tribal conflict between the Al-Fayez and a tribe from Madaba causes nationwide unrest but is soon resolved by tribal leaders.

In 2020, H.E Amer Talal Al-Fayez became President and Chairman of Al Abdali.

In 2021, H.E Faisal Al-Fayez is appointed as the President of the Jordanian Senate.

In 2022, H.E. Nayef Hmeidi Al-Fayez was appointed Chief Commissioner of the Aqaba Special Economic Zone Authority (ASEZA) by cabinet decree, following his tenure as Minister of Tourism and Antiquities.

In 2022, and again in October 2024, H.E. Faisal Al-Fayez was reappointed by Royal Decree as President of the Jordanian Senate, continuing his leadership of the Upper House of Parliament.

In 2023, H.E. Amer Talal Al-Fayez as President and Chairman of Al-Abdali Investment & Development, announced the second phase of the $5 billion downtown Amman urban development project, expanding the master plan across 1.4 million square meters.

In 2024, former Minister, Ambassador, and Senator H.E. Trad Mithqal Al-Fayez passed away; he was the last surviving son of Sheikh Mithqal Al-Fayez.

In 2026, H.E. Nayef Al-Fayez was appointed Assistant Director-General for Culture at UNESCO, joining the senior leadership team of the United Nations agency.

== Role in the founding of Modern Jordan ==
The Al-Fayez are frequently described as being central to the stability of the Jordanian state and the core of the support for the Hashemite Dynasty. Mithqal was one of the first shaykhs in 1921 to meet Abdullah bin Al-Hussein in Ma'an. After their meeting, Mithqal invited him to Amman to establish the Transjordanian emirate there which is why Amman is the capital of Jordan today rather than the much larger cities of As-Salt or Irbid at the time.

Shortly afterwards, the nascent Emirate of Transjordan faced to military threats from the Wahhabi's in 1922 to the 1923 Adwan rebellion. Mithqal is credited to be the chief factor in protecting the new state from both of these conflicts by rebranding his own army made of many of his tribesmen into the newly formed Arab Army. Faced with similar wahhabi threats, Nuri Al Sha'lan, whose son Nawwaf is married to Mithqal's sister Jawaher, sent a letter to Mithqal and Emir Abdullah for permission to enter the country from the east. Ultimately, Mithqal and the new army successfully defended the emirate, with King Faisal Al Saud noting that "if it wasn't for Beni Sakher, our borders would reach Palestine".

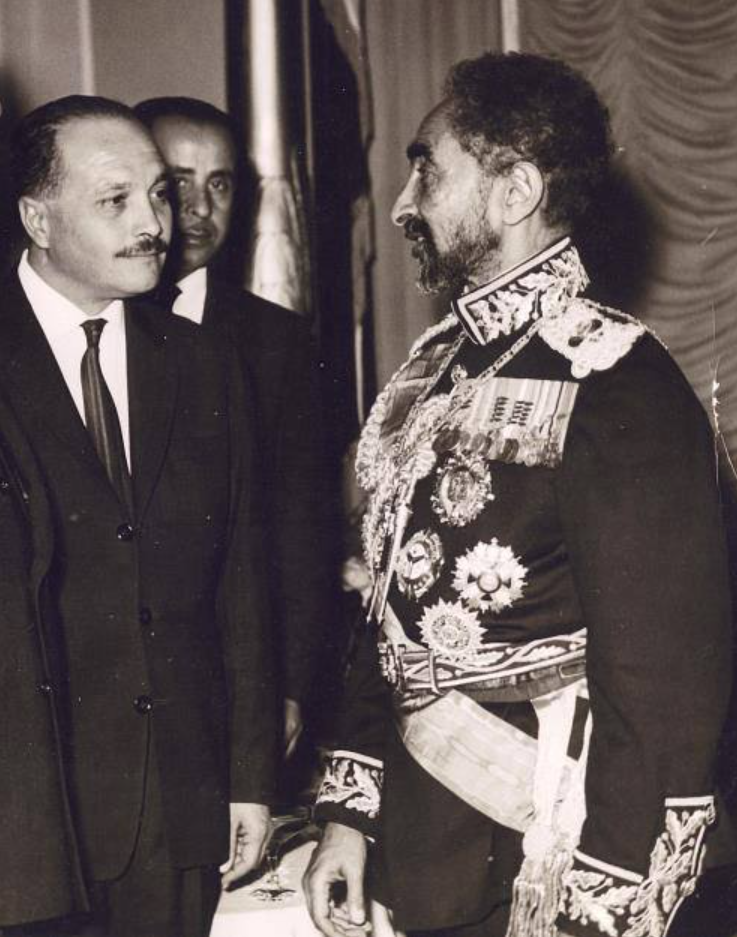
Sheikh Akef with Emperor Haile Selassie I of Ethiopia, 1966

In the conflicts and wars following the birth of the state, the Al-Fayez played a major role in protecting the state and its sovereignty.

== Heads of the House ==
The Al-Fayez have customarily chosen a head of the house (Sheikh), usually not conforming to the Bedouin custom of conferring the role to the eldest son (Albikir) of the current head, but rather to the most competent and capable person of a given generation in the family. For example, Sattam was Fendi's third son, and Mithqal was Sattam's sixth son, and Akef was Mithqal's fourth son. Note that the head of the Al-Fayez, would also be the head or co-head (with the head of the House of Khraisha) of the Bani Sakher clan as the Al-Fayez are the leading house in the clan.

	Name	Title(s)	From	Until	Notes
1st	Fayez bin Fadel	Sheikh of Sheikhs	c1640s	-1680s	-
2nd	Mouh bin Fayez	Sheikh of Sheikhs	c1680s	c1720s	Fayez's eldest son
3rd	I'dbeys bin Mouh	Sheikh of Sheikhs	c1720s	-1750	Mouh's eldest son
4th	Qa'dan bin Mouh	Sheikh of Sheikhs	c1750	c1758	I'dbeys's younger brother
5th	Mohammad bin Mouh	Sheikh of Sheikhs	c1758	c1760s	Qa'dan's younger brother
6th	Thiab bin Mohammad	Sheikh of Sheikhs	c1760s	c1780s	Mohammad's son
7th	Awad bin Thiab	Sheikh of Sheikhs	c1780s	c1823	Thiab's eldest son
8th	ِAbbas Al-Fayez	Sheikh of Sheikhs	c1823	c1835	Son of Awad Al-Fayez
9th	Fendi Al-Fayez	Emir; Old King; Sheikh of Sheikhs	c1835	1879	Son of Abbas Al-Fayez
10th	Satm Al-Fayez (Disputed with Sattam)	Sheikh	1879	May,1881	Son of Fendi Al-Fayez
11th	Sattam Al-Fayez	Agha; Emir of Al-Jizah; Pasha; Sheikh of Sheikhs	September,1881	1890	Younger brother of Satm Al-Fayez
12th	Talal Al-Fayez	Amir Al-Umara; Pasha; Sheikh of Sheikhs	1890	1909	Brother of Sattam Al-Fayez
13th	Fawaz Al-Fayez	Emir; Sheikh of Sheikhs	1909	1917	Nephew of Talal Al-Fayez, son of Sattam Al-Fayez
14th	Mashour Al-Fayez	Sheikh of Sheikhs	1917	30 April 1921	Son of Fawaz Al-Fayez
15th	Mithqal Al-Fayez	Pasha; Sheikh of Sheikhs; Qadi; Senator	31 April 1921	15 April 1967	Mashour's uncle, son of Sattam Al-Fayez
16th	Akef Al-Fayez	Sheikh of Sheikhs; Speaker of the House of Representatives; Minister; Senator	15 April 1967	8 April 1998	Son of Mithqal Al-Fayez
17th	Sami Al-Fayez	Sheikh of Sheikhs; Sheikh; Qadi; Senator	8 April 1998	18 November 2012	Brother of Akef Al-Fayez
18th	Faisal Al-Fayez	Sheikh of Sheikhs; Prime Minister; Speaker of the House of Representatives; President of the Senate	18 November 2012	present	Sami Al-Fayez's nephew and son of Akef Al-Fayez

== Notable Figures ==
17th Century:

- Fayez bin Fadel (Progenitor)
- Mouh bin Fayez

18th Century:

- Muhammad bin Mouh Al-Fayez
- Thiab bin Mohammad Al-Fayez
- Bakhit bin Thiab Al-Fayez (Progenitor of the Bakhit Branch)
- Qa'dan bin Mouh Al-Fayez (Progenitor of the Qa'dan Branch)
- I'dbeys bin Mouh Al-Fayez
- Nimer bin I'dbeys Al-Fayez (Progenitor of the Nimer Branch)
- Mahmoud bin I'dbeys Al-Fayez (Progenitor of the Mahmoud Branch)
- Fendi bin Awad Al-Fayez
- Abbas bin Awad Al-Fayez (paramount Sheikh)
- Hamed Qa'dan Al-Fayez
- Kin'eaan Qa'dan Al-Fayez (Progenitor of the Kin'eaan Branch)

19th Century:

- H.G Fendi Al-Fayez
- H.G Sattam Al-Fayez (Emir and Tribal Chief)
- H.G Talal Fendi Al-Fayez (Beylerbey and Tribal Chief)
- Suleiman Awad Al-Fayez (Progenitor of the Abu-Jneib Branch)
- Satm Fendi Al-Fayez (Tribal Chief)
- Sahan Fendi Al-Fayez (Judge)
- Eid Suleiman Al-Fayez
- Shleish Al Bakhit Al-Fayez

20th Century:

- H.G Mithqal Al Fayez (Tribal Chief, Politician, Commander-In-Fighting)
- H.G Nawaf Sattam Al-Fayez (Emir)
- H.G Fawaz Sattam Al-Fayez (Emir and Tribal Chief)
- H.E Akef Al-Fayez (Tribal Chief and politician)
- Zaid Mithqal Al-Fayez (Senior Officer at the Prime Ministry)
- Mashour Fawaz Al-Fayez (Tribal Chief)

20th Century - present:

- H.E Faisal Al-Fayez (Prime Minister, President of the Senate, Speaker of the House of Representatives)
- H.E Amer Al-Fayez (Chairman of Al-Abdali, Chief of Royal Protocol, Ministerial rank)
- H.E Trad Al-Fayez (Minister of Agriculture, Ambassador, Senator)
- H.E Eid Al-Fayez (Minister of Interior, State, and Labor)
- H.E Nayef Al-Fayez (Minister of Tourism, Chief Commissioner of ASEZA, Chairman of Aqaba Development Corporation)
- H.E Nayef Hayel Al-Fayez (Minister of Health, MP)
- H.E Daifallah Ali Al-Fayez (Ambassador of Jordan to the Netherlands, Estonia, and Latvia)
- H.E Sami Al-Fayez (Tribal Chief and Senator)
- H.E Mohammad Thiab Al-Fayez (Ambassador of Jordan to Sudan)
- Tayil Al-Fayez (President of the Jordanian Olympic Club)
- Mohammad Enad Al-Fayez (MP)
- Haytham Enad Al-Fayez (Jordanian bodybuilding champion)
- Alanoud Al-Fayez (ex-wife of King Abdullah of Saudi Arabia)
- Hakem Al-Fayez (Politician)
- Thamer Al-Fayez (MP)
- Hind Al-Fayez (MP)
- Habis Sami Al-Fayez (MP)
- Bassam Al-Fayez (MP)

== See also ==
- Sardiyya
