= Eid Al-Fayez =

Jordanian politician (1945–2025)

- عيد الفايز

Minister of Interior
- In office 25 November 2007 – 23 February 2009

Minister of Interior
- In office 27 November 2005 – 22 November 2007

Minister of State
- In office 5 December 2001 – 14 January 2002

Minister of Labor
- In office 19 June 2000 – 27 October 2001

Minister of Labor
- In office 4 March 1999 – 18 June 2000

Personal details
- Born: 10 October 1945 Manja, Emirate of Transjordan
- Died: 9 April 2025 (aged 79)
- Occupation: Perfumer

Eid Za'al Nimer Al-Fayez (Arabic: عيد زعل نمر الفايز; 10 October 1945 – 9 April 2025) was a Jordanian politician.

== Background ==
Al-Fayez was born in Manja, Jordan on 10 October 1945. He was a member of the Al-Fayez family, the ruling family of the Bani Sakhr tribe. In 1969 he received a bachelor's degree in Economics from Beirut Arab University (BAU). From then until 1983 he worked in the private sector in America. In 1983 he started working in the public sector and held various government positions such as Minister of Labour, Minister of State, Minister of Youth and Sports, and Minister of Interior which he held for several years after the 2005 Amman bombings.

Al-Fayez was a widower and had three children. He died on 9 April 2025, at the age of 79.

== Medals and decorations ==
- Jordan Globe Grand Cordon-First Degree (Arabic: وسام الكوكب الاردني من الدرجة الأولى), is considered one of the most prestigious Medals and Decorations in Jordan. Jordan Globe Grand Cordon is awarded by the King to individuals who distinguish themselves by their exceptional service to Jordan.
- United Nations Civil Defense Medal
- Grand First Degree Medal of the Lebanese Ministry of Interior

== Work experience ==
- Chairman of the Board of Trustees at Al-Zaytoonah University of Jordan 2011-
- Chairman of the Supreme Council of Civil Defence
- Chairman of the Social Security Corporation
- Chairman of the Vocational Training Corporation
- Chairman of the Union of Arab Ports
- President of the Arab Academy for Maritime Transport - Sharjah
- President of the board of directors at United Company for Organizing Land Transport
- President of Al-Badia Charity Organization
- Vice-President of Aqaba Region Authority
- Member of the board of directors at Arab Union of Land Transport
- Member of the Governing Council at the Syrian-Jordanian Company for traffic
- Member of the board of directors at National Shipping Lines
- Member of the Board of Free Zones
- Member of the board of directors at the Aqaba port Corporation
- Member of the board of directors at the Iraqi-Jordanian Land Transport Company
- Member of the board of directors at the Royal Club Research
- Member of the Technical Committee of the Supreme Chemical Industries
- Member of the Five-Year Plan Committee for the transport sector
- Member of the Jordan Olympic Committee
- Member of the Executive Committee of Jordanian Association for Boy Scouts and Girl Guides
- Member of the Greater Amman Municipality
- Member of the Supreme Committee for the development of the Southern Region
- Member of the Board of Trustees at the University of Jordan
- Member of the Board of Trustees at Al-Zaytoonah University of Jordan

== See also ==
- Faisal Al Fayez
- Al-Fayez
