= Order of the Star of Jordan =

Honorific order of Jordan

الكوكب الأردني Order of the Star of Jordan

Awarded by Jordan
- Type: Order
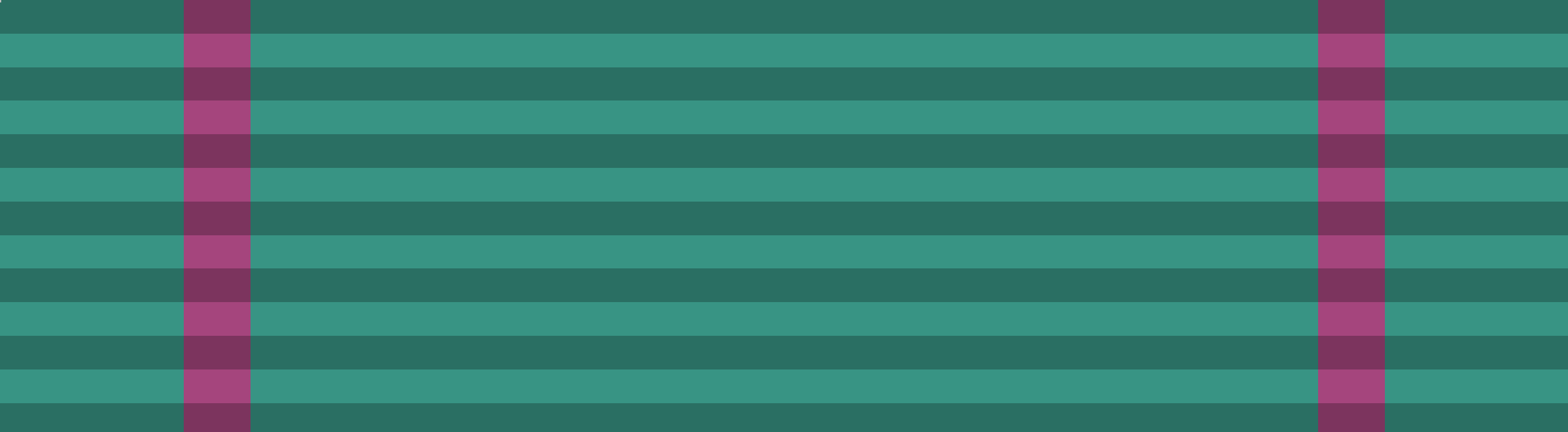
- Ribbon: Ribbon of the Star of Jordan
- Awarded for: A national order of merit
- Status: Currently constituted
- Sovereign: Abdullah II of Jordan
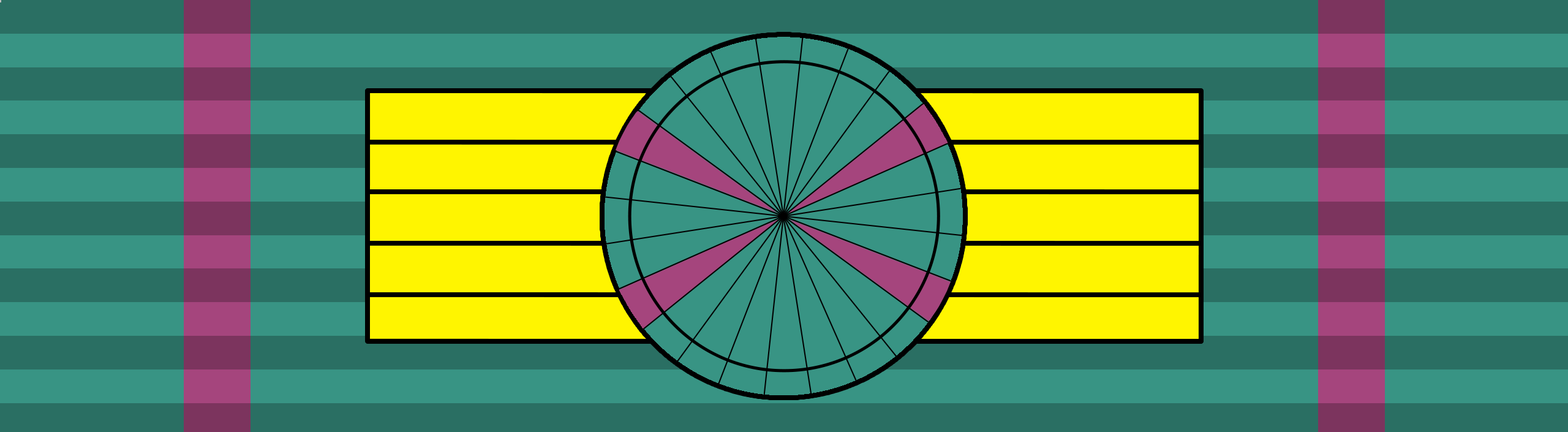
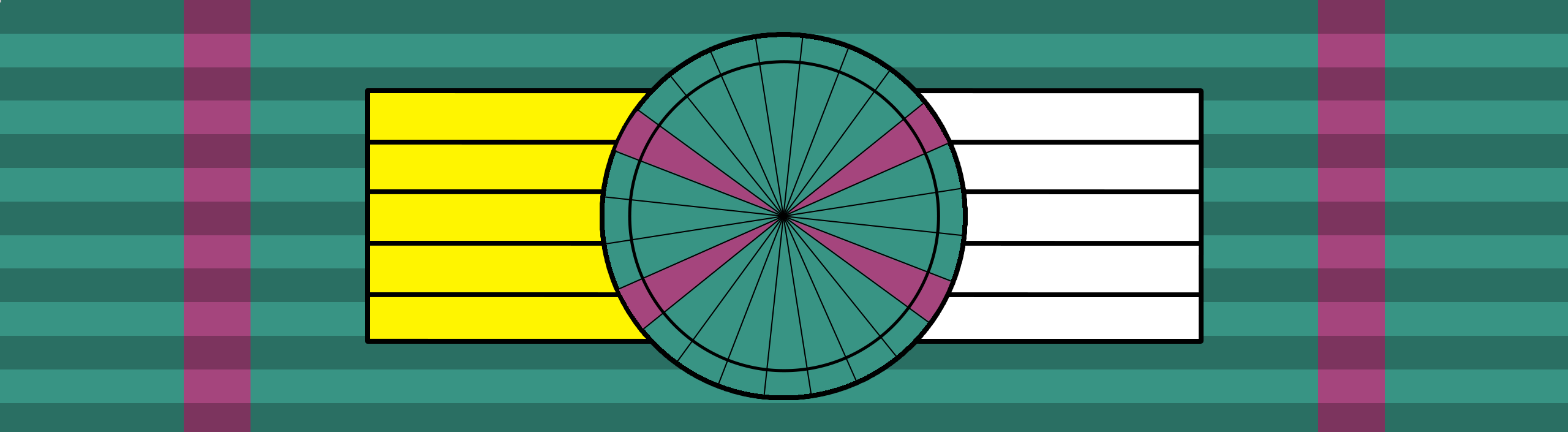
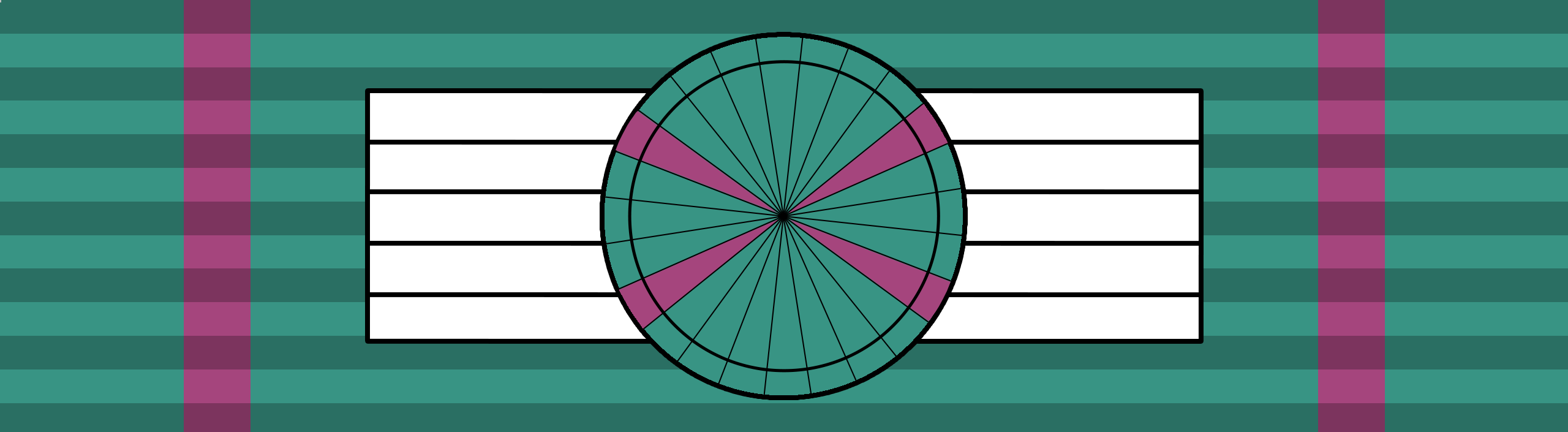
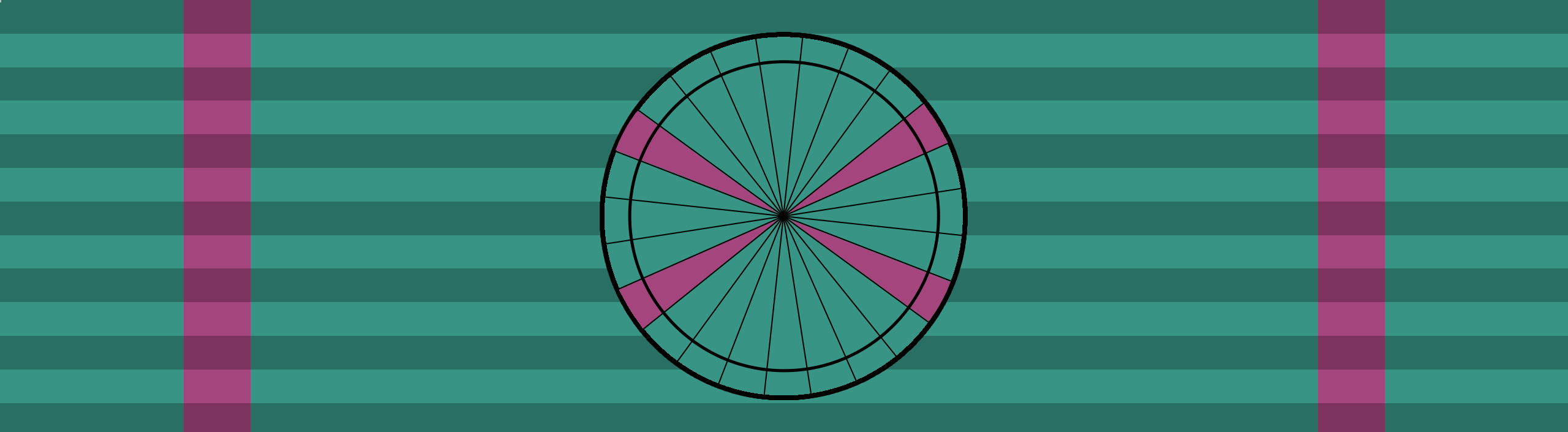
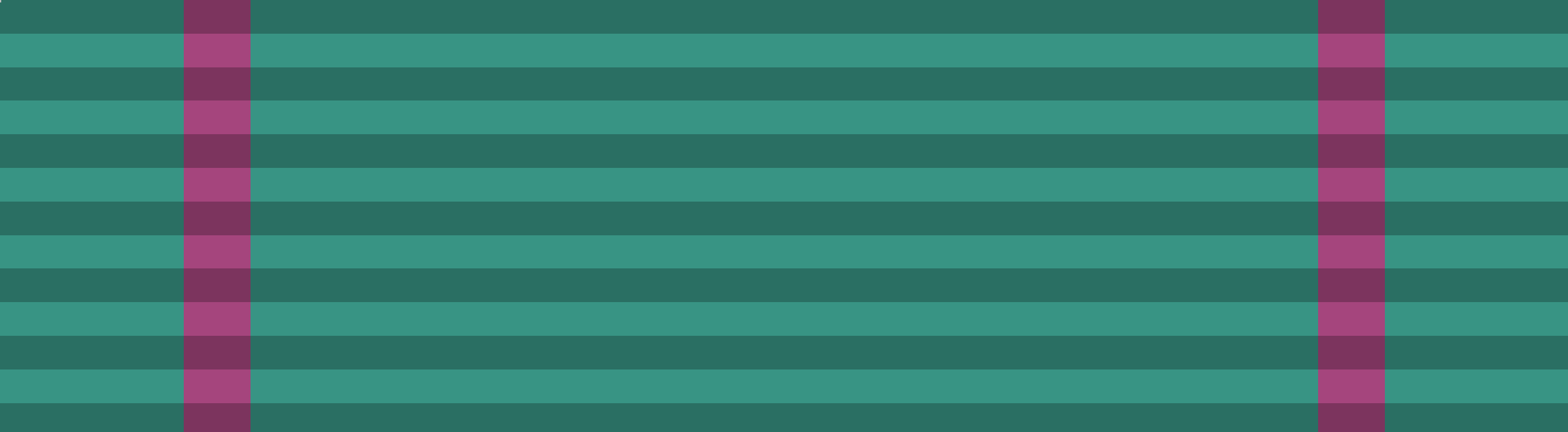
- Grades: Grand Cordon Grand Officer Commander Officer Knight

Precedence
- Next (higher): Supreme Order of the Renaissance

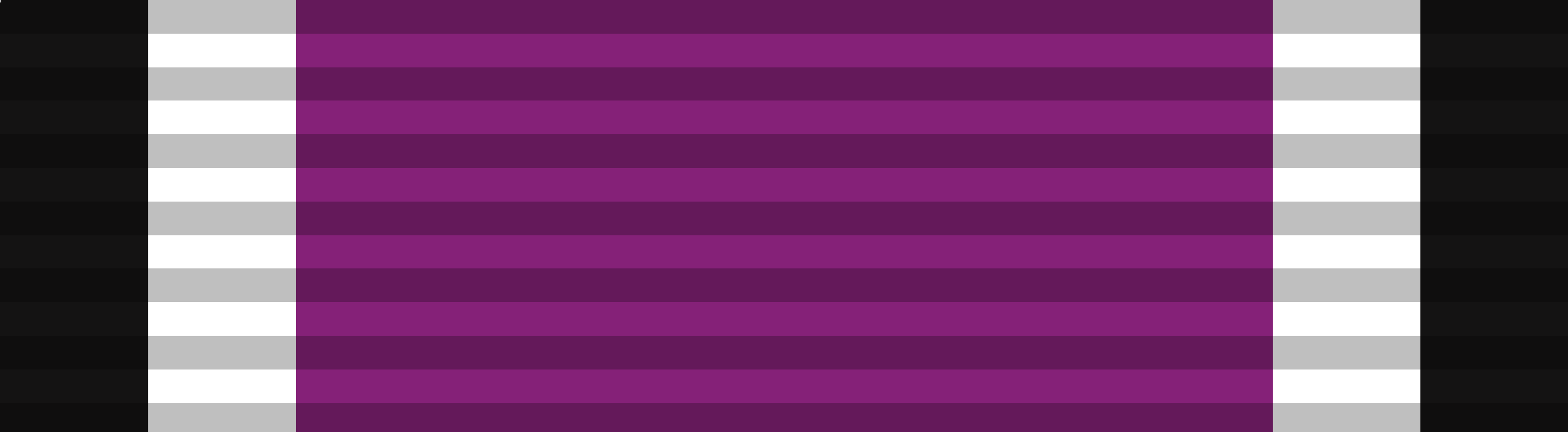
- Next (lower): Order of Independence

The Order of the Star of Jordan (Wisam al-Kawkab al-Urduni) or The Order of Hussein ibn Ali (Wisam al-Hussein ibn Ali) is an award and order of Jordan and is awarded for military or civil merit.

It was founded in honour of his father, by King Abdullah I on 22 June 1949. It was the first indigenous Jordanian order, as prior to this date King Abdullah had only awarded decorations established by his father Sharif Hussein. It was designed by Garrard & Co and is inspired by decorations awarded during the Ottoman Empire.

The order is made up of 5 Grades: Grand Cordon, Grand Officer, Commander, Officer and Member.

== Insignia ==
The order's star is seven-pointed and made of silver and enamel, and is studded with seven golden stars at the inner circle's edge. The central medallion has Arabic inscriptions that translate to: "Order of the Star of Jordan [First/Second/Third/Fourth/Fifth Class] 1366 AH [1949 AD].

The order's ribbon is dark green with narrow purple edge stripes.

== Grades ==
The Order of the Star of Jordan is divided in five classes:

The Order of the Star of Jordan Service Ribbons
| Grand Cordon | Grand Officer | Commander | Officer | Member |

== Notable recipients ==
The Order of the Star of Jordan is awarded to members of the Hashemites (the royal family) and senior officials The Order is also considered a military award and is awarded to long-serving officers.

=== Grand Cordon ===
==== Jordanians ====
- Prince Ali bin Al Hussein (formerly Grand Officer)
- Prince Faisal bin Al Hussein (formerly Grand Officer)
- Prince Ghazi bin Muhammad (formerly Officer)
- Prince Hamzah bin Al Hussein
- Prince Hashim bin Al Hussein (formerly Grand Officer)
- Prince Hassan bin Talal (formerly Commander)
- Prince Muhammad bin Talal
- Princess Alia bint Hussein
- Princess Noor Hamzah
- Prince Asem bin Al Nayef
- Prince Rashid bin El Hassan
- Prince Talal bin Muhammad
- Trad Al-Fayez
- Faisal Al-Fayez
- Amer Al-Fayez
- Amer Khammash
- Tawfiq Kreishan
- Samir Rifai
- Abdullah Ensour
- Khaled Toukan
- Bisher Al-Khasawneh
- Majed Al-Hajhassan

==== Foreigners ====
- Hamengkubuwono IX
- Lieutenant General Sudharmono, Vice President of Indonesia
- Lieutenant General Alamsyah Ratu Perwiranegara
- General Surono Reksodimedjo
- Air Marshal Rahim Khan
- Margrethe II of Denmark
- General Muhammad Zia-ul-Haq
- Muhammad Zafarullah Khan
- Queen Beatrix of the Netherlands
- Queen Elizabeth II of the United Kingdom
- Prince Edward, Duke of Kent
- Princess Astrid of Norway
- Prince Carl Philip of Sweden, Duke of Värmland (2003)
- Princess Madeleine of Sweden, Duchess of Hälsingland and Gästrikland (2003)
- Princess Lilian of Sweden, Duchess of Halland (2003)
- Infanta Elena, Duchess of Lugo
- Brigadier Amir Gulistan Janjua
- Judy Leden
- Syedna Mohammed Burhanuddin
- Colonel Timoor Daghistani
- Lt. Col Muhammad Iqbal Sarfraz, Commanding Officer 75 Lt Anti Aircraft Regiment (Katiba Mujahid), Pakistan Army. Awarded to the regiment in 1971.

=== Grand Officer ===
- Faisal bin Abdulaziz Al Saud
