= Akef Al-Fayez =

Jordanian politician (1922–1998)

His Excellency Akef Mithqal Sattam Al-Fayez
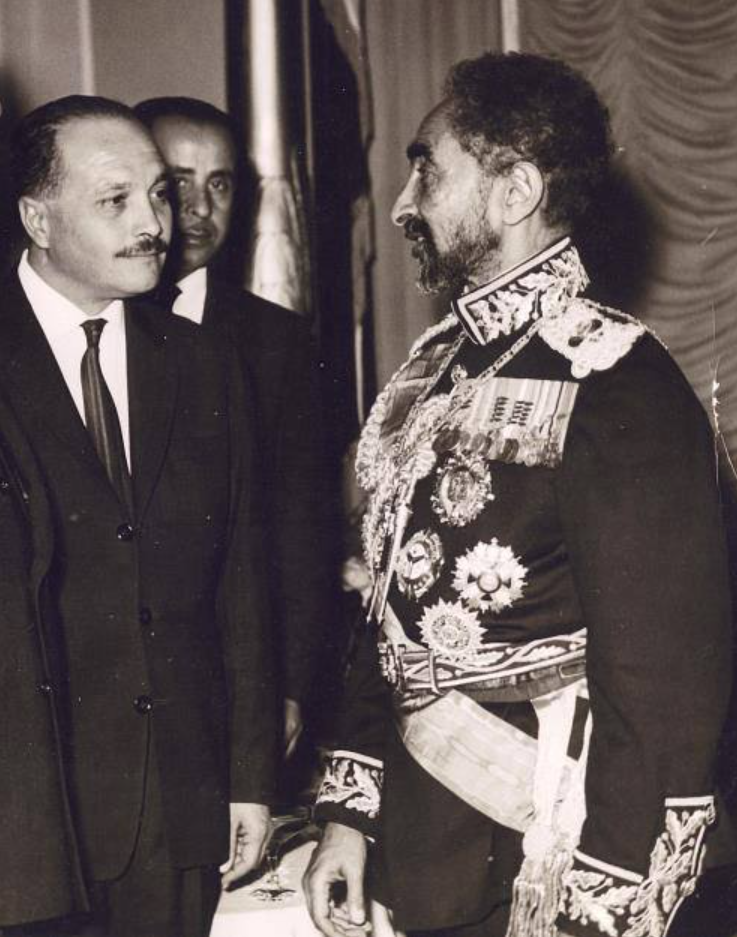
- Sheikh Akef with Emperor Haile Selassie I of Ethiopia 1966
- Born: 15 September 1922
- Died: April 8, 1998 (aged 75)
- Resting place: Umm Al Amad, Jordan
- Occupation: Politician
- Years active: 1957–1998
- Children: Faisal Al-Fayez
- Father: Mithqal Al Fayez
- Relatives: Sattam Al-Fayez (Grandfather); Saeed Pasha Khair (Grandfather); Samiha Al-Fayez (Granddaughter); Talal Al-Fayez (Uncle); Trad Al-Fayez (Brother); Sami Al-Fayez (Brother); Amer Al-Fayez (Nephew)

Akef Mithqal Al-Fayez (Arabic: عاكف مثقال الفايز, Akif Al Fayiz; 15 September 1922 – 8 April 1998) was a Jordanian politician born in Amman, Jordan. He held several ministerial positions and became speaker of the Jordanian Parliament for several sessions and a member of the Jordanian Senate.

== Family and early life ==
Akef was born and raised in Jordan to one of the most prominent political families the Al-Fayez, to the paramount leader of the Bani Sakher, Mithqal Al-fayez. He was the eldest son from his wife Adul Khair, daughter of Amman's 5th mayor Saeed Khair. He had 6 full brothers who also held various political seats in Jordan, from oldest to youngest are Zaid, Tayil, Talal, Trad, Mohammad, and Mansour Al-Fayez. Akef's own son Faisal Al-Fayez would later succeed him both as the paramount Sheikh of the Beni Sakher and as a political figure in Jordan and the Arab world as the Prime Minister of Jordan. Akef married multiple times, to Raya Al-Khayr, who bore him Faisal and Zein, to Yusra Al-Juqqa, who bore him Sultan, Malak, Ghassan, and Reem, to Nofe Al-Shaalan, with whom he had no children, and to Samiha Al-Majali, who bore him Zaid and Haya. Zaid died at the age of 31, leading to the adoption of his only daughter, Samiha Al-Fayez, by Princess Taghrid (Samiha Al-Majalli's daughter with Hazza' Al-Majali) and Prince Muhammad bin Talal.

== Political career ==
Akef enjoyed one of the most highly decorated political careers in Jordan, ranging from a variety of Ministerial offices and other high ranking politically influential offices. He held ministerial positions ten times and 2 Parliamentary positions, which are:

- In the government of Ibrahim Hashem, formed on April 24, 1957, as Minister of Agriculture and Minister of Defense in an amendment to the government on October 22, 1957,
- In the government of Samir Al-Rifai, formed on May 18, 1958, he held the position of Minister of Agriculture and Minister of Construction.
- in the government of Hazza al-Majali, formed on May 6, 1959, he held the position of Minister of Agriculture and Social Affairs
- in Bahjat Talhouni 's government, formed on August 29, 1960, he became Minister of Defense
- In the government of Samir al-Rifai, formed on March 27, 1963. he held the positions of Minister of Public Works and Minister of Transportation
- Then he held the same positions in the government of Sharif Hussein bin Nasser, formed on April 21, 1963.
- Akef holds his first position as speaker of the Jordanian Parliament from 1963 till 1966.
- In the government of Saad Jumah, formed on April 23, 1967, he held the positions of Minister of Transportation and Minister of Tourism and Antiquities.
- In the government of Bahjat Talhouni, formed on October 7, 1967, he held the position of Minister of Communications and Minister of State for Prime Minister Affairs.
- In the government of Abdelmunim Rifai, formed on March 24, 1969, he became Deputy Prime Minister and Minister of Interior
- He became vice president and Minister for Prime Minister Affairs in an amendment made to the government on June 30, 1969,
- in Abdelmunim's government formed on June 27, 1970, he held the position of Minister of State for Prime Minister Affairs
- Akef later on served as speaker of the Jordanian Parliament for the second time in 1984

== Al-Watan Political Party ==
On July 14, 1993, the Al-Watan Political Party has been legalized in Jordan by King Hussein, and Akef Al-Fayez was its leader. The party's ideology is Right of Center, Tribalist. The party was later combined with several other parties to form The National Constitutional Party.

== See also ==
- Fendi Al-Fayez
- Sattam Al-Fayez
- Mithqal Al Fayez
- Faisal Al Fayez
- Al-Fayez
