= Amer Al-Fayez =

Jordanian politician

His Excellency Amer Talal al-Fayez

Head of Royal Protocol at The Royal Hashemite Court
- In office 4 Nov 2008 – 20 June 2018

Personal details
- Born: Amer Talal Mithqal Al-Fayez; 25 January 1968 (age 58) Amman, Jordan
- Children: Abdullah, Ali, Hamzah
- Relatives: Talal Al-Fayez (father); Mithqal Al Fayez (grandfather); Sattam Al-Fayez (great grandfather); Faisal Al-Fayez (cousin)
- Education: University of Jordan

Amer Talal Al-Fayez (Arabic: عامر طلال مثقال الفايز, (born 25 January 1968) is a Jordanian statesman and politician who served as the Head of Royal Protocol and is currently the president and chairman at Al-Abdali Investment & Development PSC.

== Early life ==
Al-Fayez was born in Amman in 1968 to Sheikh Talal Mithqal Al-Fayez and Mrs. Abu-Nameh. He grew up in a politically active environment as his father and uncles of the sheikhly Al-Fayez family held various positions at the top levels of the Jordanian government, following his grandfather's example Sheikh Mithqal Pasha Al-Fayez who helped establish the Emirate of Transjordan in 1921. Al-Fayez developed an interest in horseback and motorbike riding from an early age. In 1990, Al-Fayez graduated from the University of Jordan with a Bachelors in Political science, later got married in 1993 to Mrs. Muna Shaheen, and together they have three sons.

== Political career ==
Al-Fayez began his career as a statesman in 1991 when he joined the ministry of Foreign Affairs Diplomatic Corps in 1991. In 1993, Al-Fayez joined the Embassy of Jordan in Washington D.C as a diplomat and assumed the responsibilities of a Consul. In 1997, Al-Fayez returned to Jordan and in 1998 joined the Royal Hashemite court.

Al-Fayez served for 2 years in the Royal Protocol of Her Majesty Queen Noor of Jordan. From 2000 till 2004, Al-Fayez served in the Royal Protocol of then Crown Prince His Royal Highness Prince Hamzeh Bin Al Hussein. Al-Fayez would then spend 2 years as the director of His Royal Highness Prince Hashim Bin Al Hussein's office until 2006. Al-Fayez then served as the Assistant Chief of Royal Protocol and Director of Advance. In November 2008, Al-Fayez assumed the role of the Head of Royal Protocol of His Majesty King Abullah II of Jordan and would stay in the position until June of 2018, making him the longest serving Head of Royal Protocol to King Abdullah II and the second longest in Jordan history after Yanal Hikmat until present. In March 2009, Al-Fayez was promoted to the rank of minister by the Royal Decree of King Abdullah II.

Al-Fayez was also acknowledged by King Abdullah II in his 2011 book "Our Last Best Chance: a Story of War And Peace" for his work in coordinating interviews with Jordanian officials to get their accounts on events that the king describes in his writing.

== Al-Abdali ==
In July 2020, Al-Fayez became the president and chairman of the board of directors of Al-Abdali Investment & Development PSC. Amidst the difficulties of the Covid-19 pandemic, Al-Abdali under Al-Fayez's leadership saw a surge in new tenancies and the extending of existing ones.

In February 2023, Al-Fayez commented that work is currently underway for the second phase of the Al-Abdali project, which expects to cover 134,000 square meters with a development area of 1.4 million square meters. Al-Fayez also disclosed that roughly 20 million people have visited Al-Abdali and 6.2 million visited the boulevard in 2022.

== Honours ==
=== National ===
- Jordan:
  - Grand Cordon of the Order of the Star of Jordan
  - Commander of the Order of Independence

=== Foreign ===
- Portugal:
  - Grand Cross of the Order of Prince Henry
- Italy:
  - Grand Cross of the Order of Merit
- Belgium:
  - Grand Cross of the Order of the Crown
- Ukraine:
  - Order of Merit

== See also ==
- Faisal Al-Fayez
- Akef Al-Fayez
- Mithqal Al Fayez
- Al-Fayez
- Al Abdali
