= Al Anoud Al Fayez =

Former wife of King Abdullah of Saudi Arabia (born 1957)

Al Anoud bint Dahham Al Fayez
- Born: 1957 (age 68–69); Kingdom of Jordan
- Spouse: Abdullah of Saudi Arabia (m. 1972; div. 2003)
- Issue: Princess Jawaher; Princess Hala; Princess Maha; Princess Sahar
- House: Al-Fayez
- Father: Sheikh Daham bin Dardah Al-Bakhit Al-Fayez
- Mother: Gutnah Bint Mithqal Pasha Al-Fayez

Sheikha Al Anoud bint Dahham Al Fayez (Arabic: العنود بنت دحام الفايز; born 1957) is a Jordanian noblewoman and former Saudi royal. She is the daughter of one of the sheikhs of the Al-Fayez clan from Bani Sakher, Sheikh Daham bin Dardah Al-Bakhit Al-Fayez and his wife Gutnah bint Mithqal Pasha Al-Fayez, daughter of the paramount Sheikh of the Bani Sakher.

She married King Abdullah bin Abdulaziz Al Saud in 1972 when she was 15 years old and he was about 50 years old. They divorced in 2003 and she has since then lived in London, United Kingdom. The King reportedly soured on her because of their inability to produce a son. She is the mother of four daughters: Jawaher, Hala, Maha, and Sahar Al-Saud. Her daughters were held captive by the Saudi regime, prompting Sheikha Al Anoud to call on the international community to help them. In 2021, her daughter Hala died. Her daughter Maha died six months later.

== Marriage to the Saudi king ==
When she was fifteen years old, Sheikha Al Anoud entered into an arranged marriage with King Abdullah of Saudi Arabia. They have four daughters together: Princess Jawaher bint Abdullah bin Abdulaziz, Princess Hala bint Abdullah bin Abdulaziz, Princess Maha bint Abdullah bin Abdulaziz, and Princess Sahar bint Abdullah bin Abdulaziz. Sheikha Alanoud and King Abdullah divorced in 2003.

== The case of Al Anoud and her daughters ==
Al Anoud Al Fayez appealed to US President Barack Obama during his visit to Saudi Arabia to intervene to release her four daughters who had been detained by their father for 14 years, contrary to their desire in a palace in Jeddah, while noting that her daughters had not yet obtained an ID or passport and eat one meal per day.

Al Anoud Al Fayez, in an interview with The Times stated that her four daughters were being held by force, and cut off from the outside world. The king appointed the daughters' half-brother to monitor them and document any request for them to leave the palace, provided that it is subject to strict restrictions and was for the purpose of purchases only.

The Sunday Times newspaper sent the full details of the allegations of the two sisters and their mother to the Saudi embassy in London without receiving a response from them, and the United Nations High Commissioner for Human Rights also conveyed the letter of Al Anoud to Rashida Mango, the United Nations Special Rapporteur on violence against women, to take the necessary measures. She has lived since her divorce in 2003 in London.

According to The New Yorker, Abdullah bin Abdulaziz Al Saud was long considered a relatively progressive monarch, having allowed a series of women’s-rights initiatives. However, this attitude did not extend to his wife, Al Anoud Al Fayez, and their daughters over whom he held strict male lifelong guardianship. At the time of his death in January 2015, his daughters had already been held in captivity nearly fifteen years, in heavily guarded buildings facing but cordoned off from escape via the Red Sea. They reported they were drugged, starved, and denied medical care. The princesses have not been heard from since King Salman took the throne. The Office of the U.N. High Commissioner for Human Rights claims it is only able to seek “information and clarifications from concerned parties” in cases of alleged abuses. The Saudi government has declined to respond to inquiries. No government has publicly raised the issue of their safety and human rights. As of June 2023, their fate remains entirely unknown.

== See also ==
- Al-Fayez
- House of Saud
- Mithqal Al-Fayez
