= Al-Jizah, Jordan =

Al-Jizah الجيزة
- District
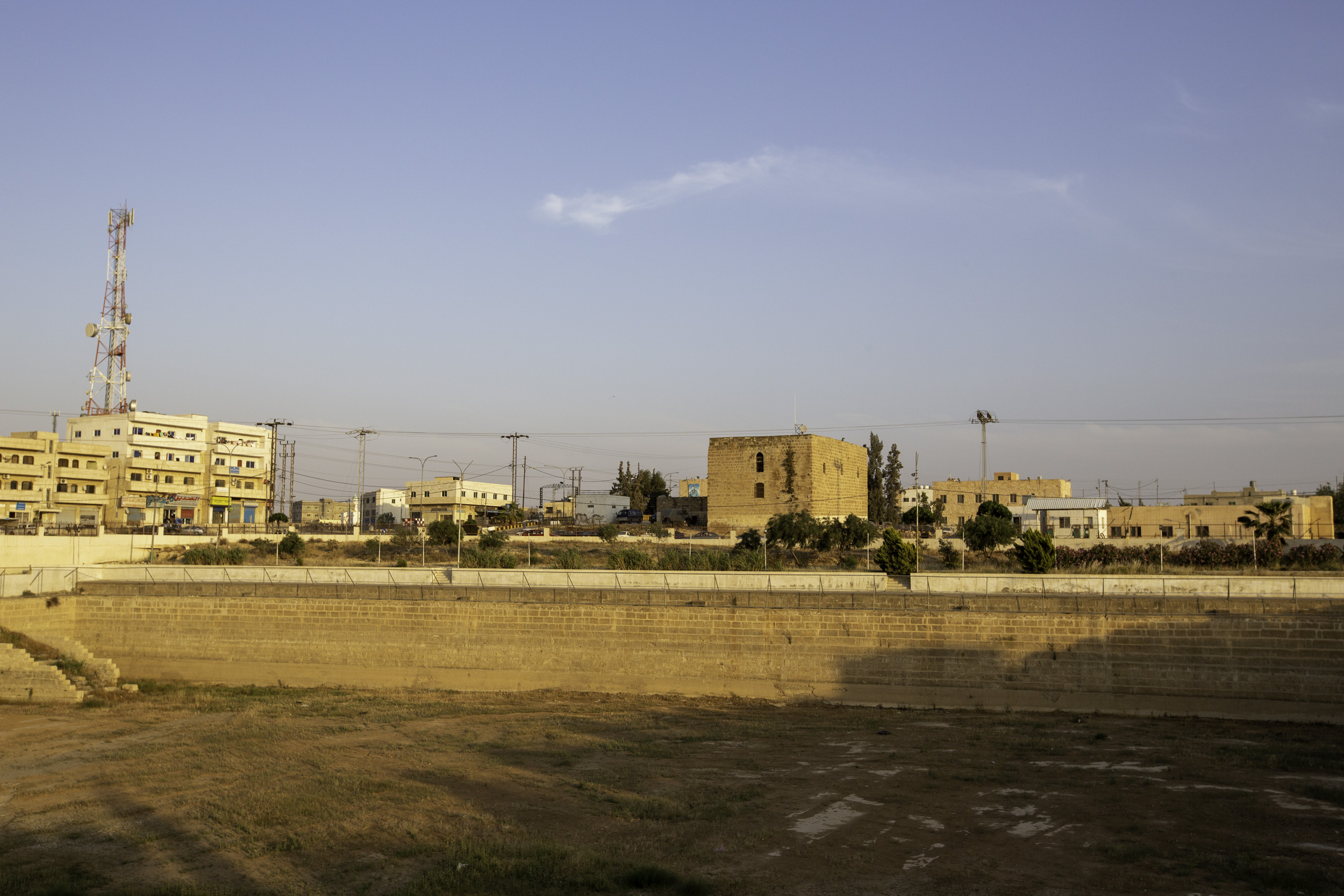
- The reservoir and a Mamluk-era building in al-Jizah

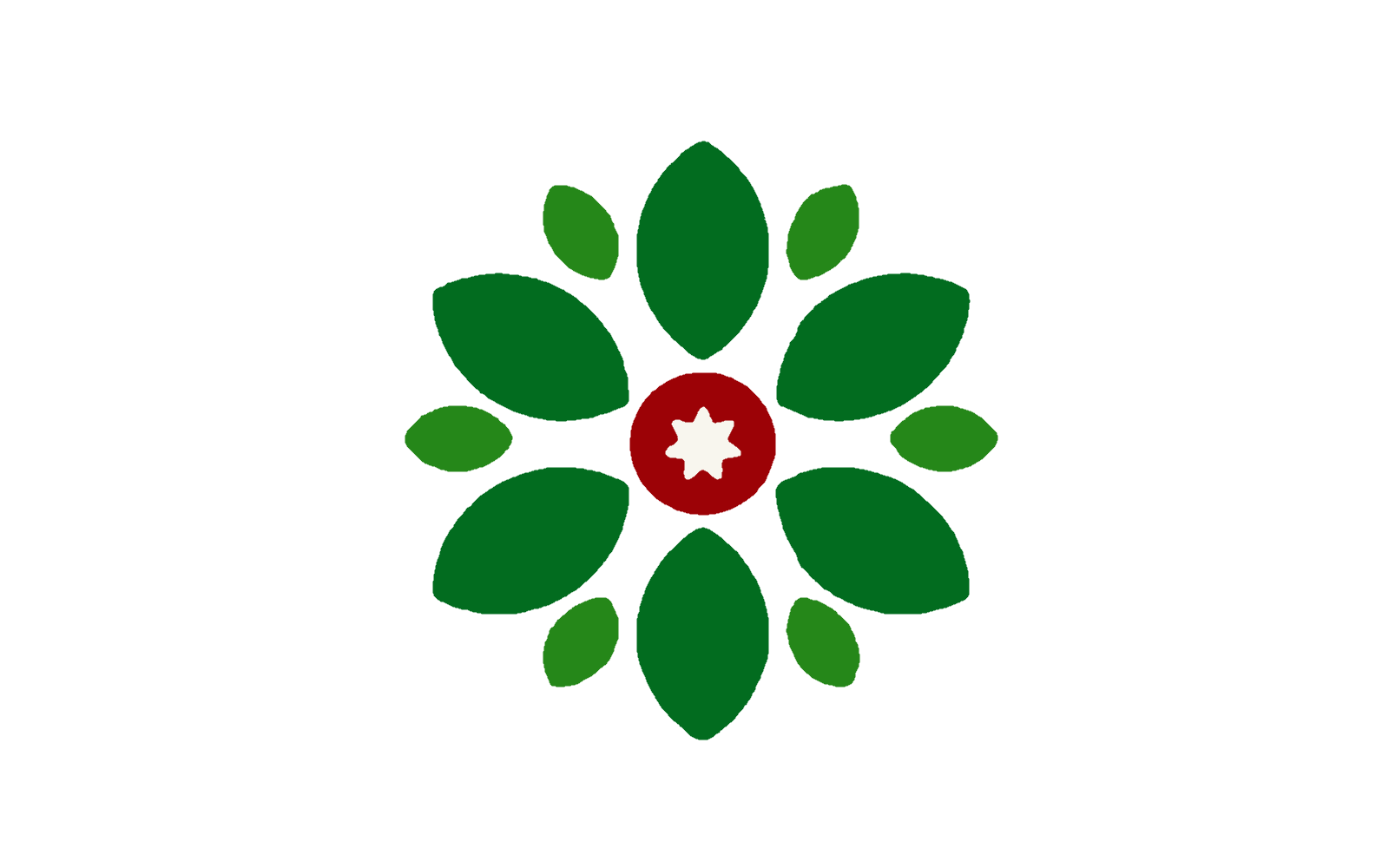
- Flag

- Location within Jordan
- Coordinates: 31°41′0″N 35°57′0″E
- PAL: 240/121
- Country: Jordan
- Governorate: Amman Governorate

Population (2021)
  - Total: 110,097
- Time zone: UTC + 3

Al-Jizah (also spelled Jize), historically known as Ziza or Zizia, is a town in northwestern Jordan. It is the 22nd district of the Amman Governorate. During the medieval period it served as a waystation for pilgrims en route to the Hajj in Mecca. This function ceased in the 17th century, though a fort remained there, however was later reinstated when the Al-Fayez clan of the Bani Sakher gained the rights for Hajj protection in the 18th century. The region has been one of the Al-Fayez strongholds ever since.

== History ==
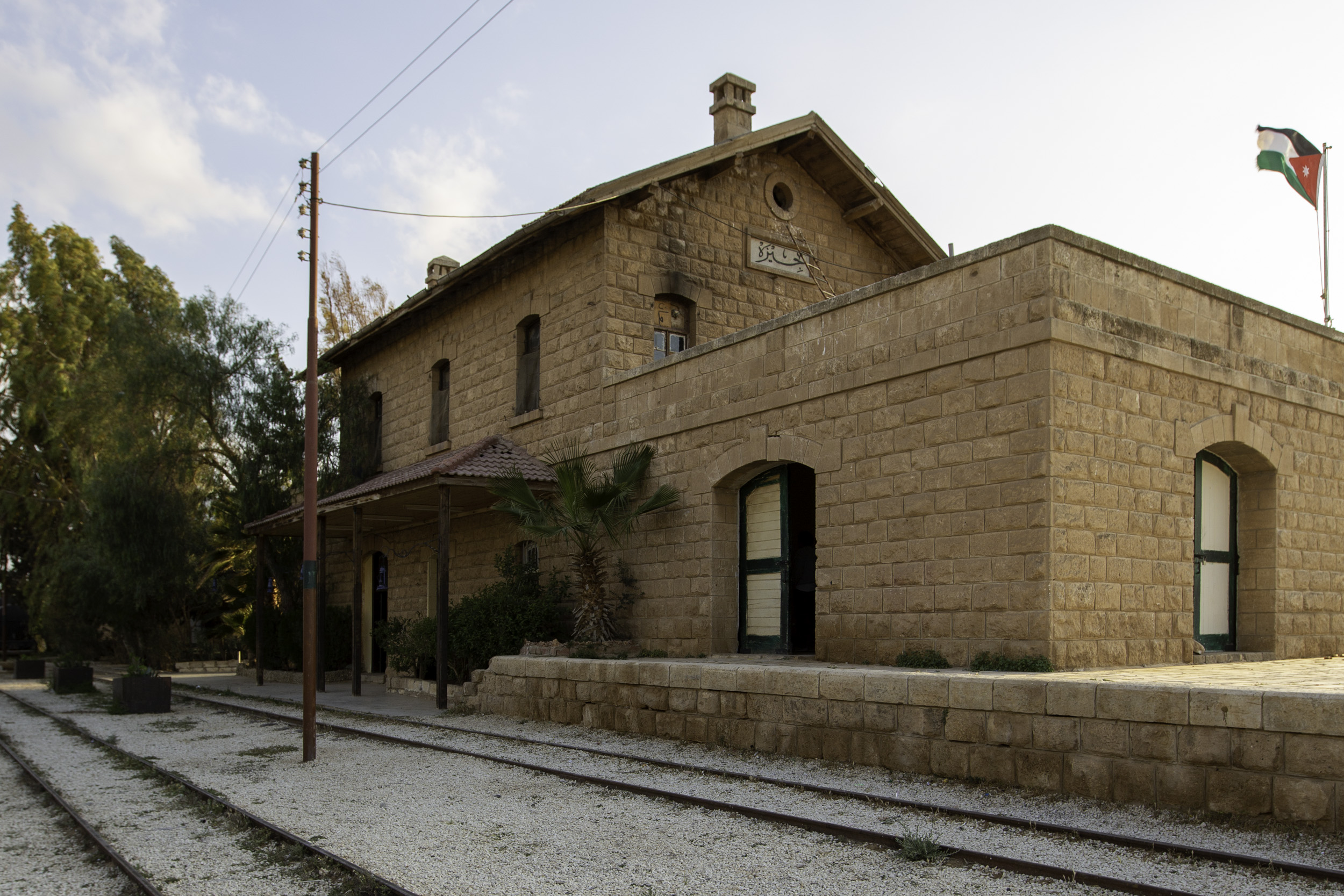
The old Hejaz Railway station of al-Jizah

Zizia was first definitively mentioned in 400 CE, when the Notitia Dignitatum referred to it as a base of Ilyrian cavalry. A Greek inscription found in one of the walls of a medieval fort in Zizia notes a repair was done on the fort's predecessor in 580. During the Muslim conquest of Byzantine Syria in 634, the Arab Muslim general Khalid ibn al-Walid defeated at Zizia a coalition of pro-Byzantine Arab Christian tribes, including the Salihids, Ghassanids, Kalb, Tanukhids, Judham and Lakhm.

Zizia was part of the Balqa subdistrict of Jund Dimashq (the military district of Damascus) during the early Islamic period. The Umayyad caliph al-Walid II (r. 743–744) is held to have distributed food at Zizia for Muslim pilgrims returning to Syria from the Hajj in Mecca. The early 13th-century geographer Yaqut al-Hamawi described Zizia as a large village with a market and reservoir (Birka Zizia) located on the Hajj pilgrimage route to Mecca. The 14th-century geographers Abu'l-Fida and Ibn Battuta both mention Zizia as a stop on the Hajj pilgrimage route. A fort existed at the site at least by 1569, the Ottoman sultan issued orders to the governor of Damascus to repair it.

From the 17th century, Zizia is no longer noted as a Hajj waystation, implying that it was replaced with a site further to its east. The son of the Druze strongman Fakhr al-Din II, Ali Ma'n, took refuge in Zizia around 1613, to escape the pursuit of the Sardiyya tribe, which had been commissioned by the governor Ahmed Hafiz Pasha to capture him. The first Western account of Zizia was the description of the site by Henry Baker Tristram, who remarked that it had been "one of the most important places of Roman Arabia" and noted the existence of a large fort there. This fort is most likely the extant fort in al-Jizah currently used as a station for the Desert Police.

In 1881, the head sheikh of the powerful Beni Sakhr tribe, Sattam Al-Fayez, made Zizia the headquarters of a subdistrict which he founded. Sattam restored the fort of Zizia, which was "furnished with a splendour unknown in the desert" according to Gertrude Bell. During British rule, the fort served as a base for the Arab Legion and it is now used by the Desert Police.

== See also ==
- List of cities in Jordan

== Bibliography ==
- Hillenbrand, Carole, ed. (1989). The History of al-Ṭabarī, Volume XXVI: The Waning of the Umayyad Caliphate: Prelude to Revolution, A.D. 738–744/A.H. 121–126. SUNY Series in Near Eastern Studies. Albany, New York: State University of New York Press. ISBN 978-0-88706-810-2.
- Petersen, Andrew (2012). The Medieval and Ottoman Hajj Route: An Archaeological and Historical Study. Oxford: Oxbow Books. ISBN 978-1-84217-502-6.
- Shahid, Irfan (1986). Byzantium and the Arabs in the Fourth Century. Washington, D. C.: Dumbarton Oaks Research Library and Collection. ISBN 0-88402-116-5.
- Shahid, Irfan (2006) [1989]. Byzantium and the Arabs in the Fifth Century. Washington, D. C.: Dumbarton Oaks Research Library and Collection. ISBN 0-88402-152-1.
- Shahid, Irfan (1995). Byzantium and the Arabs in the Sixth Century, Volume 1, Part 1: Political and Military History. Washington, D. C.: Dumbarton Oaks Research Library and Collection. ISBN 0-88402-214-5.
