= Mithqal Al-Fayez =

Jordanian political leader (1885-1967)

Mithqal bin Sattam Al-Fayez
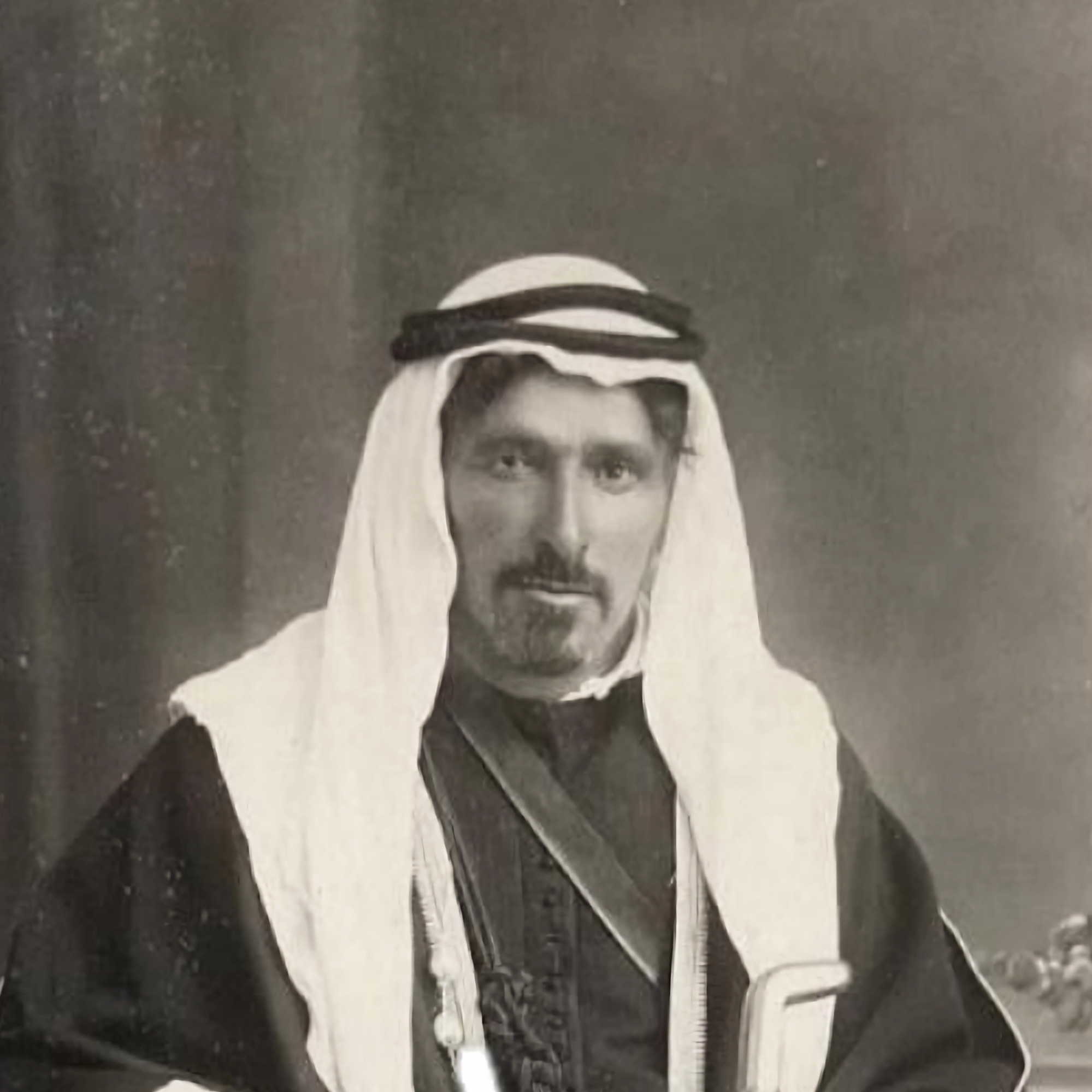
- Died: April 14, 1967 (aged 86)
- Resting place: Um Al-Amad, Amman, Jordan
- Occupations: Political and tribal leader Lieutenant general of the Arab Army
- Years active: 1921–1967
- Title: Pasha (Given by Mehmed V); Sheikh of Sheikhs; Sheikh of Bani Sakher
- Predecessor: Mashour bin Fawaz Al-Fayez
- Successor: Akef Al-Fayez
- Children: Akef Al-Fayez; Trad Al-Fayez; Sami Al-Fayez; Zayd Al-Fayez; Tayil Al-Fayez and 16 more
- Father: Sattam Al-Fayez
- Relatives: Fendi Al-Fayez (Grandfather); Talal Al-Fayez (Uncle); Faisal Al-Fayez (Grandchild); Princes Mashour, Mamdouh, and Thamer (Great-grandnephews)

Mithqal bin Sattam bin Fendi al-Fayez (Arabic: مثقال الفايز; c. 1880 – April 14, 1967) was a prominent Jordanian and Ottoman-era aristocratic statesman and tribal leader who played a central role in the establishment of the Hashemite Kingdom of Jordan.

As the Paramount Sheikh of the Bani Sakhr confederation, al-Fayez commanded the Al-Twaga branch of the tribe, which encompasses 32 distinct clans, including his own princely Al-Fayez family. Rising to power in the early 20th century, he became one of the most influential political figures in the region. During the first half of the century, he was recognized as the wealthiest individual and the largest landowner in Jordan, serving as a vital link between the tribal desert interior and the burgeoning central government.

== Early life and children ==
Mithqal Sattam Al-Fayez was born into the family of the leading shaykhs of the Bani Sakhr tribal confederacy around the year 1885. By that point the tribe was already one of the largest and strongest nomadic tribal groups in the Syrian Desert, with an unbroken chain of leadership being passed down from father to son since his third great-grandfather Thiab bin Mohammad Al-Fayez in the 1760s. Due to his father Sattam bin Fendi's death in 1891, Mithqal's childhood was spent with the Kawakbeh family of the Ruwallah tribe, his mother's tribe, where he learned to ride and battle. He also adopted their accent and it stuck with him his whole life. Mithqal would only come back to the Bani Sakher around the year 1900, and the first written evidence of him was in 1906 when he was already a prominent Sheikh in the family at the age of 21. Like his grandfather Emir Fendi Al-Fayez, Mithqal would have 14 sons that had children of their own: Akef, Zayd, Talal, Tayil, Trad, Mohammad, Sultan, Mashour, Mansur, Sami, Ali, Nayif, Rakan, and Al Nashmi. He also had 7 daughters, most notably Al Sheikha Sultana.

== Rise to power ==
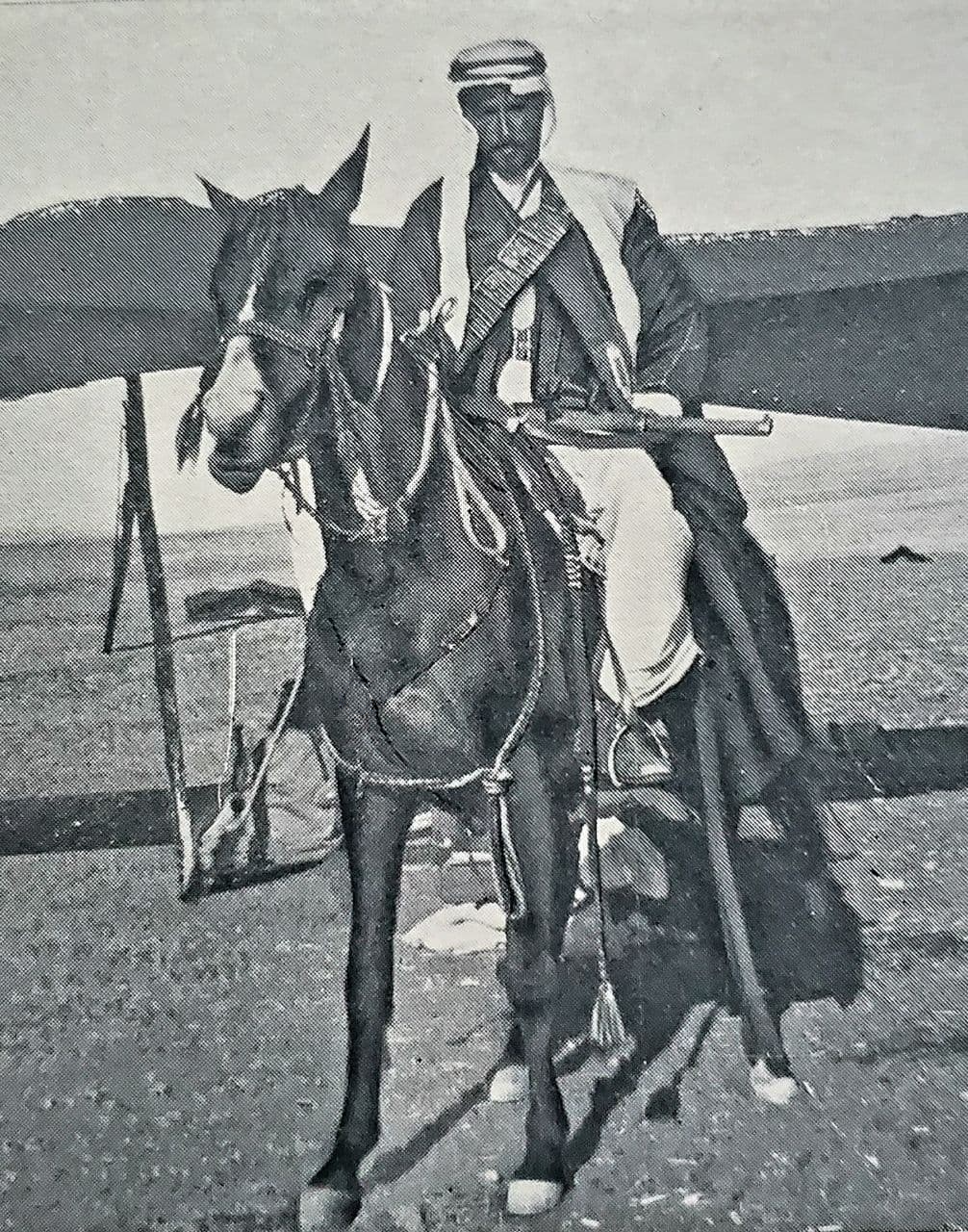
Mithqal riding in 1924, taken by W.B. Seabrook

Mithqal quickly made a name for himself as a leader of raids. His success in battle has quickly earned him a reputation which helped to provide him with the springboard to the position of leadership.

Mithqal's elder brother, Fawwaz Al-Fayez, was the leader of the Bani Sakher before him, however a newspaper report from 1913 implies that the two shaykhs were acting as partners in the leadership of the Bani Sakhr under Ottoman patronage. By that time, they were generally known for their friendship with the government and faced internal opposition for that reason.

Upon Fawwaz's death in the summer of 1917, Mithqal made a bid on becoming the next Sheikh of the Clan, however, Mithqal lost to his seventeen-year-old nephew, Mashour, Fawwaz's son. The tribal council preferred the young Mashhur, who was a graduate of a school in Damascus, to the illiterate Mithqal, even though the latter was more mature and experienced. Mithqal did not agree with his younger cousin taking the position, in return, he was given the title of Pasha by Sultan Mehmed V, and was the last Arabian Sheikh to ever get this title from the Ottomans.

After Mashour's death four years later in a tribal conflict, Mithqal was an uncontested choice for the title.

== Adventures in Arabia ==
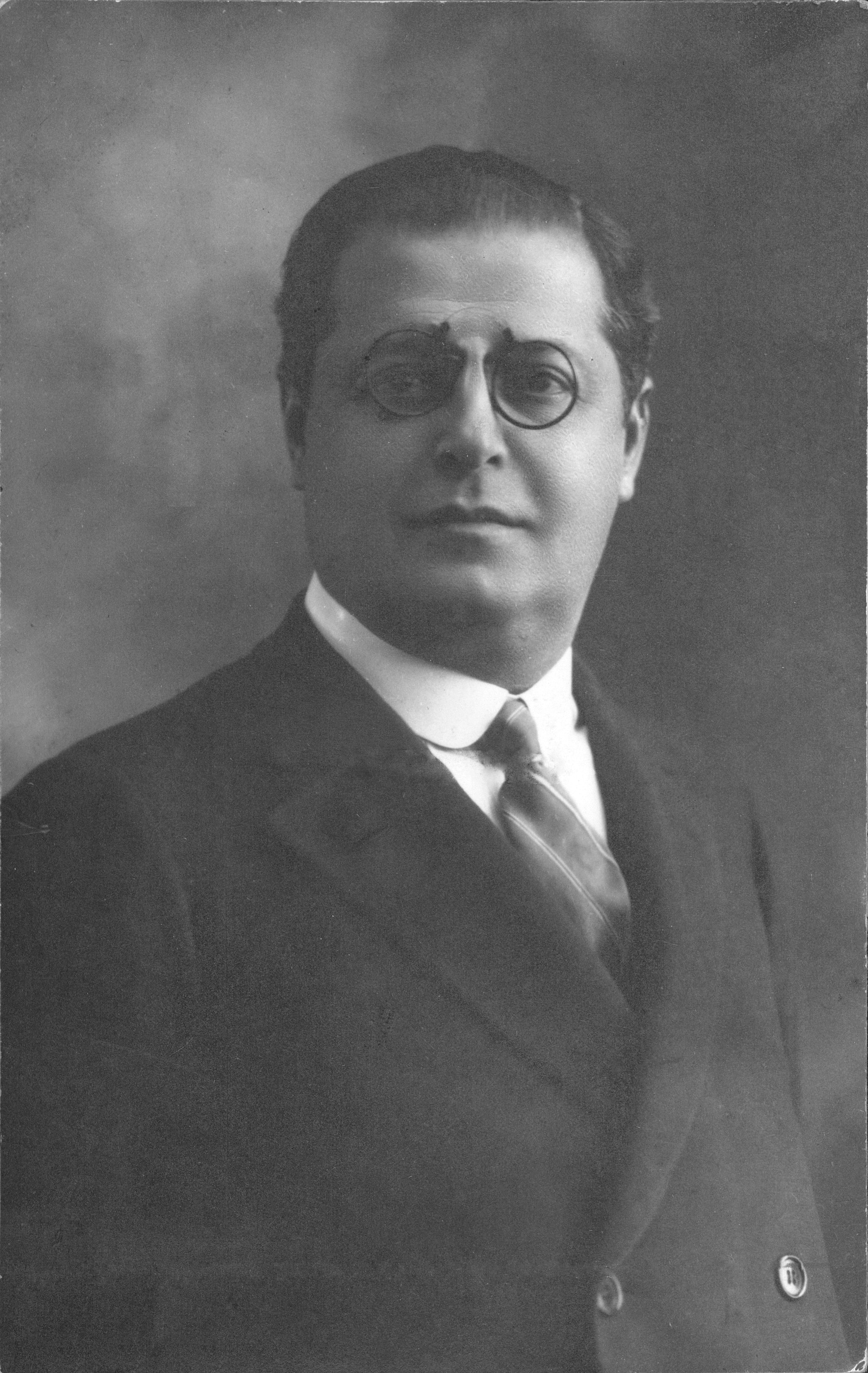
Emir Emin Arslan

In 1925, William Seabrook sought to meet Mithqal after he heard about him from Emir Emin Arslan, where the Emir sent him to Ali Rikabi Pasha, Jordan's third prime minister, so that he would relay him to Emir Abdullah I, who would "surely know where Mithqal is", as they "called each other cousins and were friends for years". Emir Emin sent William with a letter in his name, which read

In the name of Allah, the Merciful, the Compassionate. This man is in my face, and in the face of Mithkal Pasha el Fayiz, shiekh of shiekhs of the Beni Sakhr, with whom, if he is touched, will be a blood feud.”

William would soon use this letter as he was stopped by bedouin thieves who ordered of him all his and his guide's belongings, and at the reading of the letter they choose to apologize and let them pass.

William eventually reaches Mithqal's encampment, and writes his first impressions of him:

“So this was the man of whom my princely friend has told me so many fascinating things, which now flashed through my mind in a jumble as I stood facing him- the overlord of fifty thousand flocks and twelve thousand fighting-men, a multi-millionaire even in terms of American dollars- the owner of six villages and many miles of cultivated land, and a palace”

"In any company in the world Mithkal would have stood out as a born aristocrat. He was a man of scarcely forty, medium height, slender, with beautifully formed hands, smooth, olive-tanned complexion, features of classic regularity, small pointed black beard and a small moustache, with deep brown eyes remarkable for their kindliness and intelligence- but which I learned later could turn black and flash fire.”

William would spend months with Mithqal and the Bani Sakher, ride in battles with them, and retell famous tribal stories such as "The Eyes of Gutne" and Haditha's benevolence in his book Adventures in Arabia (1927).

== Relationships and Alliances ==
Mithqal himself was born from a calculated strategic alliance between the Beni Sakher and the Ruwalla, and over the course of his lifetime he built strong mutually beneficial relations with other important figures in Arabia and abroad.

=== King Abdullah I ===
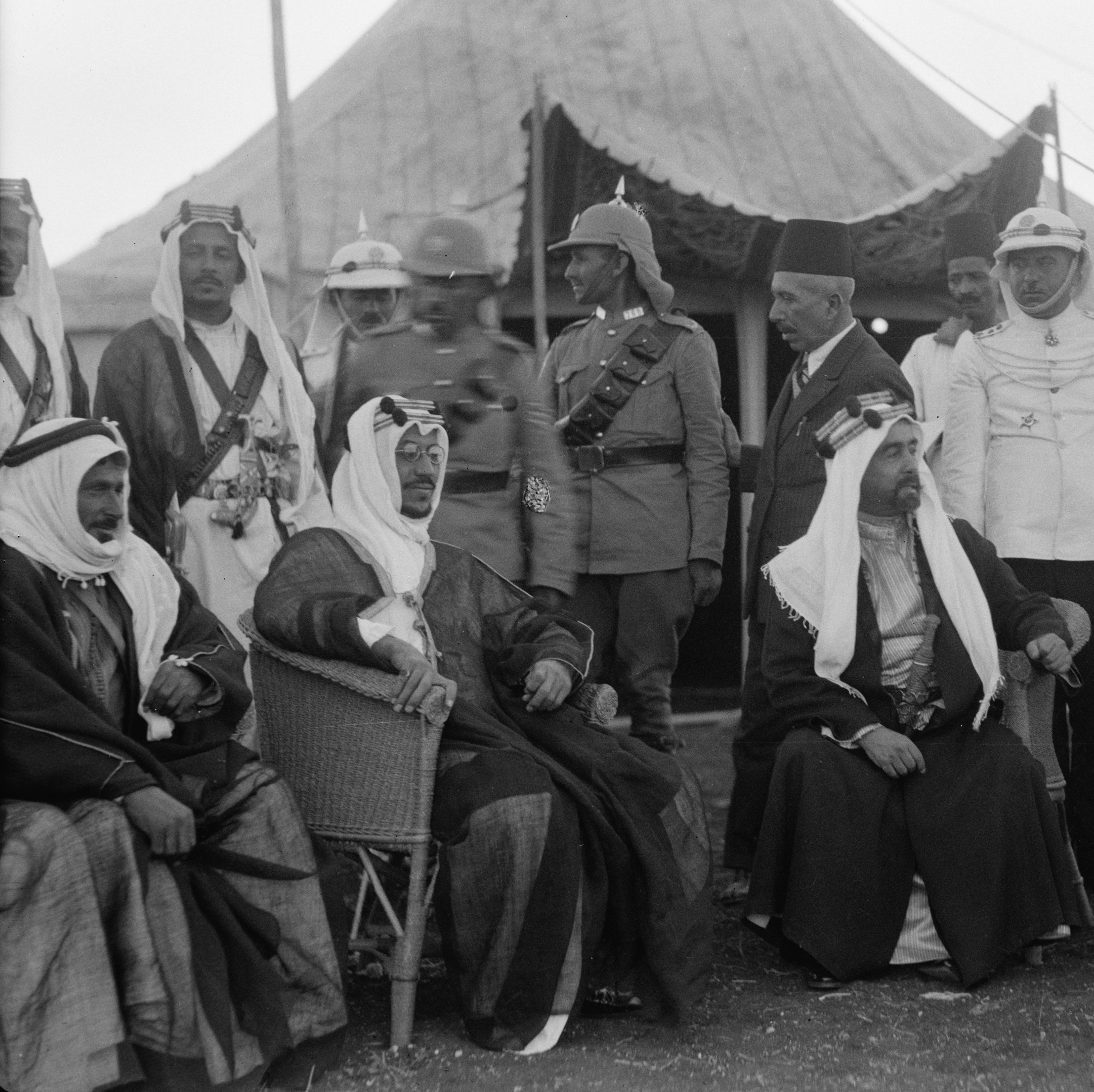
From left to right: Mithqal Pasha, King Saud bin Abdulaziz, King Abdullah I of Jordan, in the 1930s

Then Emir Abdullah I had a personal, political, and business relationship with Mithqal. Their first meeting was in 1920, when Mithqal accepted Abdullah's invitation to a meeting in Ma'an, agreeing to ally himself and his tribe with Abdullah and inviting him to Amman. With the support of Mithqal and his father-in-law Mayor Saeed Pasha Khayr, Amman turned into the Hashemites focal point in Jordan. Mithqal was Abdullah's most important and powerful ally in Jordan, and in return Abdullah exempted Mithqal and his family from taxes and granted them back the land that the Ottoman's confiscated to build the Hijaz railway and gifts such as the car he gave to Mithqal.

In the summer of 1923, Mithqal was conferred the rank of lieutenant general of the emirate's army. This was due to Mithqal's contribution and increasing involvement in protecting the emirate's borders from its eastern flank against the Wahhabi's expansionist aggression.

When in 1930, Mithqal's eldest son Sultan died of illness, Mithqal refused to leave his grave after the funeral; only to be persuaded by Emir Abdullah. In 1924, Mithqal and Emir Abdullah went together to Mecca to perform the Hajj. Mithqal would publicly support Abdullah in his attempt to unify the country, this helped cement the Emir's position in Jordan which was still governed tribally at the time. Mithqal's support of Emir Abdullah (and later kings) is also noted as one of the reasons of Jordan's relative stability and its sovereign integrity as King Faisal Al Saud have noted that "if it wasn't for Beni Sakher, our borders would reach Palestine". Emir Abdullah would help lend Mithqal money to cultivate his land, and when the Emir's own funds were lacking, he and Mithqal would secure land deals and mortgage both of their lands to foreign bankers as the added size of both Mithqal's and the governments land helps leverage the deals to their favor. In 1934, Mithqal was a guest of honor at Talal bin Abdullah's wedding.

=== King Abdulaziz of Saudi Arabia ===
Mithqal maintained close relations with Abdulaziz, through his son Akef who he regularly sent to the king's court, and through his cousin Dahham Al-Fayez, whose half-sister married Abdulaziz around 1936. Dahham was invited to the king's court in Riyadh. In March 1940, when Transjordanian authorities discovered a coded correspondence between Mithqal and Ibn Saud, facilitated by Akef and Dahham. This secret contact with Ibn Saud marked a departure from Mithqal's cautious approach since 1937–38, reflecting his concerns over growing state power encroaching on his traditional autonomy. By 1939, Transjordan had acquired many traits of a modern state, including a government monopoly on coercive power, exemplified by the expansion of the Desert Patrol to three hundred men.

The British were outraged by Mithqal's secret correspondence with Abdulaziz and confronted him on a different matter shortly after discovering it. Speculation grew that Mithqal might depart for Saudi Arabia, a rumor he encouraged to pressure Abdullah. Despite being personally invited by Abdulaziz, Mithqal did not cross the border. His significant investments in cultivated land in Transjordan ultimately made him stay, as the immovability of this property was crucial to his decision.

Glubb pasha suspected Mithqal's connection with Ibn Saud was to impress Abdullah, but another possible motivation was that Mithqal viewed the Saudis as an insurance policy against potential future conflicts with the Transjordanian government. Mithqal had previously used the “Saudi option” as a negotiation tactic during a fallout with Abdullah in 1937 and considered moving to Saudi territory during subsequent crises.

=== King Saud of Saudi Arabia ===
With King Saud, Mithqal enjoyed a much more personal and less political friendship than he did with King Abdulaziz. Mithqal and Saud travelled together regularly throughout the Middle East region, and they both hosted each other in their respective palaces numerous times.

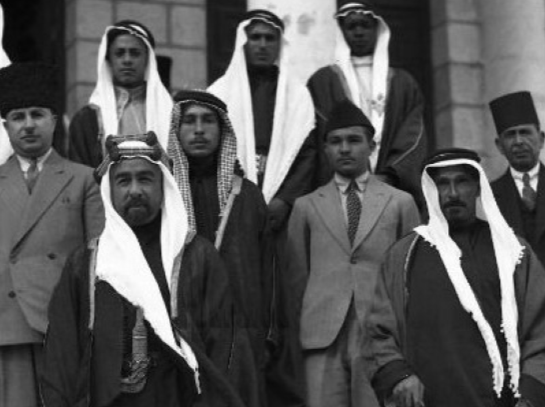
King Abdullah and Sheikh Mithqal at Crown Prince Talal's wedding in 1934.

=== King Faisal I of Iraq ===
Mithqal maintained a friendly relationship with King Faisal I after 1919, he knew Faisal before he became King of Iraq and famously hosted him in Um Al-Amad in 1923, where Faisal stayed the night. Mithqal also attended the reception of Faisal in Alexandria, and the ceremony of the death of King Faisal's son Ghazi.

=== King Farouk I of Egypt ===
The Alawiyya dynasty of Egypt and the Al-Fayez have long-standing cordial relationships going as far back as Mithqal's grandfather, Fendi, sending his son Sattam with gifts of rare horse breeds to Ismail Pasha in the 1840s. This relationship continued with Mithqal and Farouk I's friendship. Mithqal was a guest at Farouk's wedding and would regularly frequent the Abdeen Palace.

=== Notable Regional Sheikhs and dignitaries ===
Some of Mithqal's political and tribal allies in central Jordan were his father-in-law, Saeed Pasha Kheir, his Ka'abnah counterpart Sheikh Haditha Al-Khraisha, the Hadid tribe Sheikhs Shaher and Minwer Al-Hadid. Mithqal also mended relations with Sheikh Fawaz Barakat Al-Zoubi of Al-Ramtha in Northern Jordan.

Of Jordan's merchants and businessmen, Mithqal was a focal point of agriculture in the region and had the support of his friend and trusted financier Abdul Hameed Shoman. He also would enjoyed great business and cordial relationships with Mohammad Sabri Tabbaa and Ra'ouf Abujaber.

In Palestine Mithqal was a household name and would feature frequently in headlines of the Jaffa-based newspaper Falastin. He was supported and had strong political relationships with both Musa Kadhim Al-Husseini and Hajj Amin Al-Husseini.

== Role in Jordan's agriculture ==
Mithqal inherited his father's, Sattam Al-Fayez, interest in agriculture, and further developed and cultivated the lands in Jordan for barely, wheat, lentils, olives, and other vegetables. Mithqal's role in Jordan's agriculture was crucial for the well-being of the country, as he was the first person to import a mechanical tractor and plough in the country's history. The effect of this purchase has helped the country out of a poverty-stricken famine in the mid-1930s as the production of wheat and barely has increased from 40,000 tons and 16,000 from 1936 to 113,000 tons and 53,000 tons in 1937; this effectively tripled the food supply of the land and helped in feeding its inhabitants. This increase in production has also tripled Jordan's food exports during those years, which opened the much needed revenue for the poverty stricken Transjordan of that time.

== Ambush of the 1930s ==
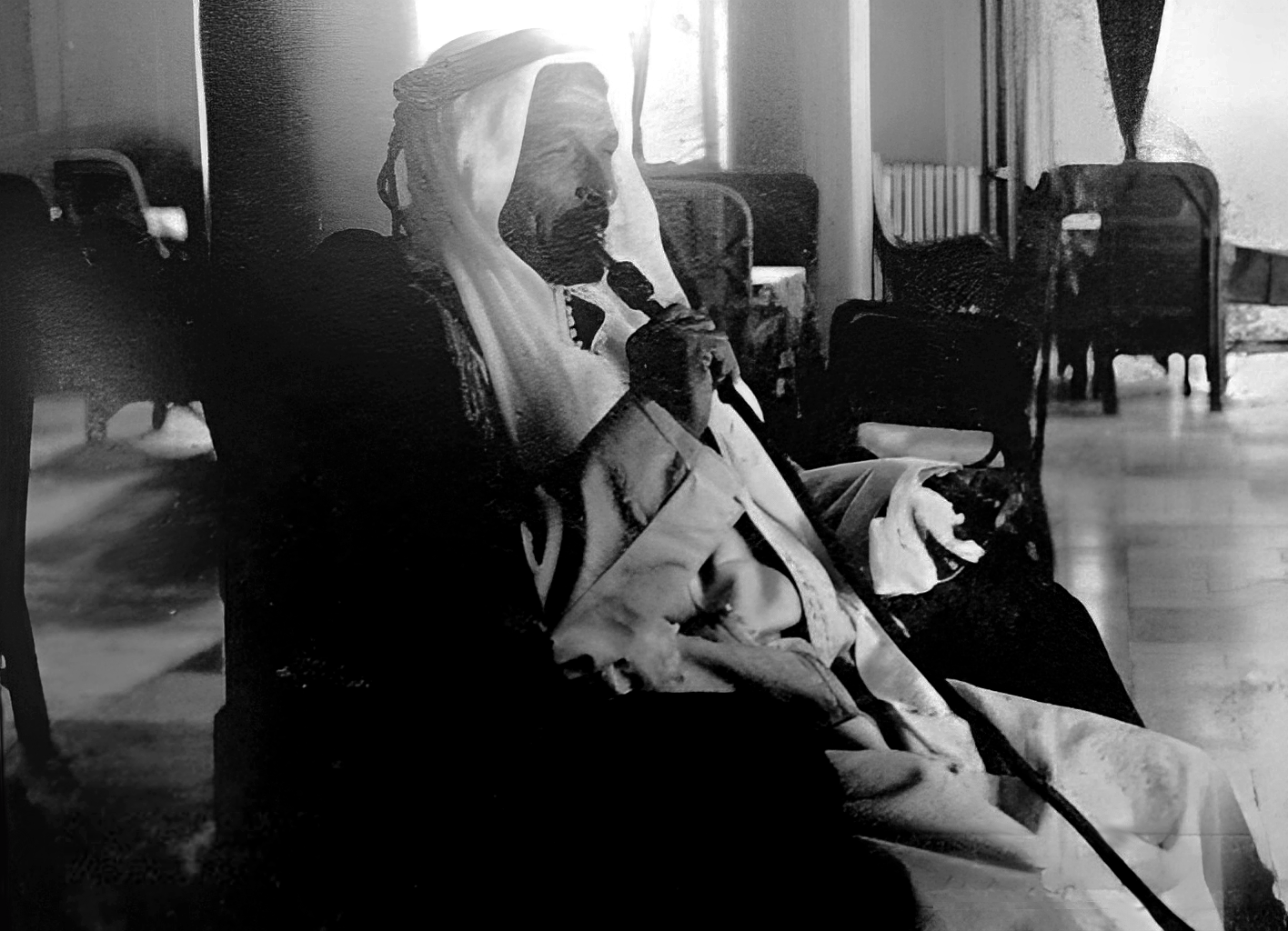
Mithqal Pasha smoking his waterpipe in 1939 in Jerusalem.

Mithqal was riding his mare in the desert accompanied by only one man. It was during the winter season, and the Bani Sakhr had migrated east towards Wadi Sirhan. Suddenly, Mithqal and his escort were surprised by an ambush set by members of an enemy tribe. A bullet grazed the side of Mithqal's head, almost killing him, and he was hit in the shoulder. Mithqal and his escort fired back and managed to drive off their attackers, but Mithqal was badly wounded. His escort tied a piece of cloth around his bleeding shoulder, pulled him over his mare, and rode on quickly to seek aid.

They arrived in the nearby camp of a Bani Sakhr tribesman and asked for his help in fetching a car to take Mithqal to a hospital. He sent one of his men by camel to the encampment of Shaykh Haditha Al-Khraisha, who in turn sent a messenger to Amman. A car finally arrived, but in the meantime, Mithqal was suffering from loss of blood and in great pain. Mithqal spent twenty days in an Amman hospital. He survived, but the damage was irreversible. For the rest of his life, he could hardly use that arm, which dangled nearly lifeless from his shoulder.

== Imprisonment of Major General Fredrick Peake ==
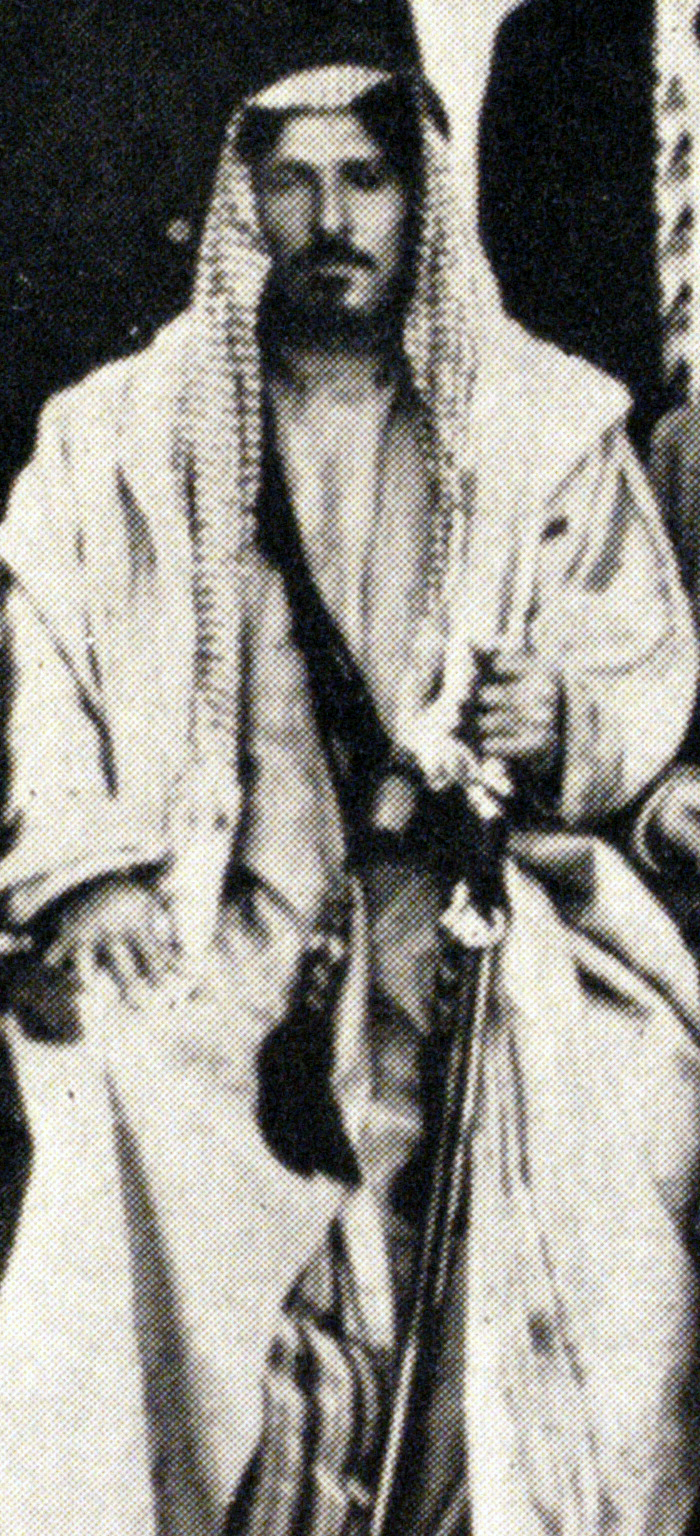
Mithqal in Jerusalem, 1933.

In 1919, over a decade long land dispute, Major General Fredrick Peake pursued a meeting with Mithqal to discuss the dispute. However, Mithqal choose to stay in his family's headquarters in Um Al Amad, which then prompted Peake to approach him unarmed to avoid a large conflict. Initially, Mithqal agreed to his request, however the day after Mithqal ordered the arrest of the Major General, which led to Peake to stay in the stables of the Al-Fayez for at least a day. It is unclear why Mithqal ordered the arrest of Peake, and although Peake writes unfavorably of Mithqal in an undermining manner in his books, he reportedly "bore no grudge" according to C.S. Jarvis's biography of the Peake.

== Last years ==
Mithqal's health soon began deteriorating soon after the death in 1962 of his favorite wife ‘Adul, which was a severe blow to Mithqal. In the last five years of his life, he suffered from progressively declining health. Although he received superb medical treatment in Cairo, Beirut, and Europe, diabetes and other age-related illnesses brought about his death in his late eighties in April 1967.

== Mithqal's Legacy ==
The mourning period was over and the dignitaries and ordinary people left Mithqal's house. The bereaved family was left to deal with the huge void created by Mithqal's demise. It was undisputed that the elder son, Akef Al-Fayez, would become the head of the family and the main bearer of his father's legacy. His sons Sami, Tayil, Talal, and Trad would also have major roles in Jordanian and Tribal power structures. His daughter, Sultana would become one of Jordan's most prolific philanthropists, renowned for financially supporting the education of many women in Jordan and Palestine and donating complete medical centers to impoverished areas.

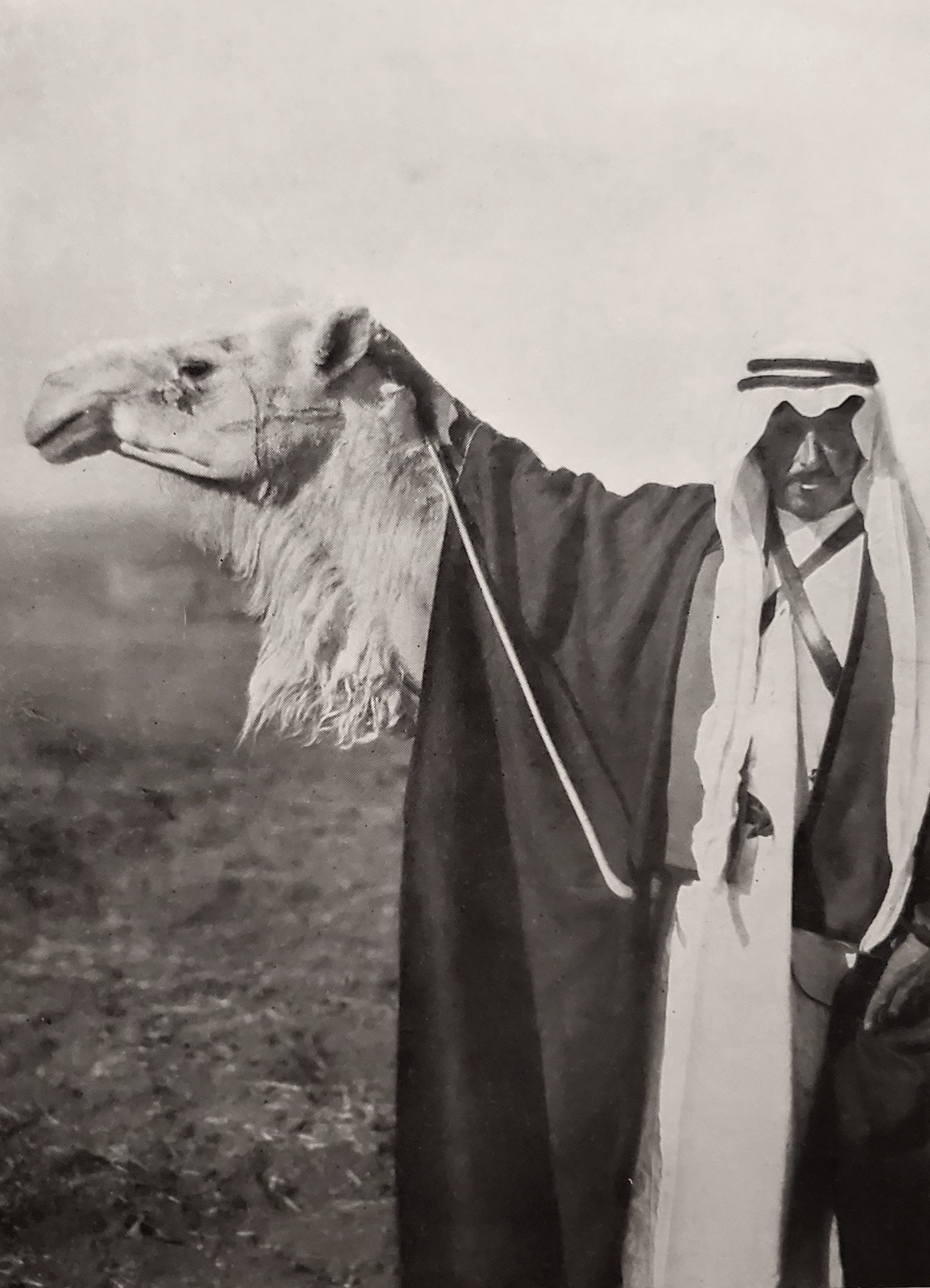
Al-Fayez with his favorited camel

On July 1, 1981, the Sheikh Mithqal Al-Fayez mosque was opened by King Hussein in Um Al-Amad. The mosque was built by Akef, in commemoration of his late father. The opening was attended by King Hussein, pretender to the Iraqi Throne Ra'ad Bin Zaid, Islamic chief justice Sheikh Ibrahim Al Qatan, and Minister of Awqaf and Islamic Affairs Kamel Al Sharif.

One of the first things the family did was to gather to distribute Mithqal's huge landholdings. By the time of his death, Mithqal had accumulated at the very least 120,000 dunams (30,000 acres) in Jordan, mostly around south Amman and northern Madaba. Several years later, the family sold a large portion of that land to the Jordanian government. Today, Queen Alia International Airport stands on what used to be Mithqal's fields.

On May 25, 2021, Mithqal was posthumously awarded the Medal of the State Centennial, on the Kingdom's on the 75th Independence, his son H.E Trad Al-Fayez received the award on his behalf. Mithqal's son, Akef Al-Fayez was also posthumously awarded the medal, received by his Akef's son H.E Faisal Al-Fayez.

== Mithqal in Popular Culture ==
Mithqal was a main character and the paramount character in the first half of William Seabrook's Adventures in Arabia when William sought to find Mithqal and experience the Arabian lifestyle in the late 1920s.

In early 2018, a TV Drama Series following Mithqal's life was announced to be in the works by the Al-Hijjawi production company.

On May 22, 2019, Al-Mamlaka broadcast a 50-minute documentary on their television channel that follows events from Mithqal's life. The documentary has also been uploaded to their YouTube channel

== See also ==
- Fendi Al-Fayez
- Akef Al-Fayez
- Faisal Al Fayez
- Al-Fayez
