= Sattam Al-Fayez =

Arabian Emir (c. 1830 - 1891)

Sattam bin Fendi Al-Fayez
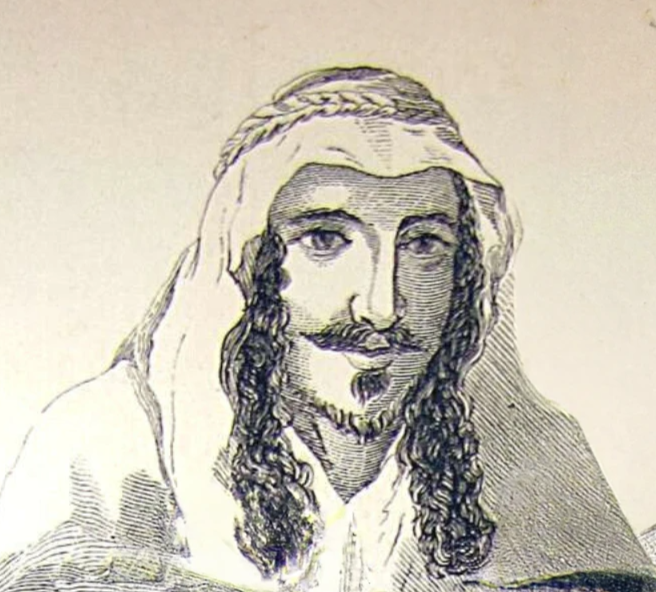
- Born: c. 1830
- Died: 1891 (aged 60–61)
- Resting place: Umm Al-Amad, Jordan
- Occupations: Emir and Tribal Leader
- Years active: 1881–1891
- Title: Emir; Paramount Shaykh; Agha
- Predecessor: Satm Al-Fayez (Disputed)
- Successor: Talal Al-Fayez
- Children: Mithqal Al Fayez
- Father: Fendi Al-Fayez
- Relatives: Talal Al-Fayez (brother); Akef Al-Fayez (grandson); Princes Mashour, Mamdouh, and Thamer Al-Saud. (Great grandchildren)

Sattam bin Fendi bin Abbas Al Fayez (Arabic: سطام الفايز, (c. 1830 – 1891) was a tribal chief or emir who led the Bani Sakher tribe from 1881 until his death in 1891. He was the de facto ruler of the Bani Sakher after his father Fendi Al-Fayez gave him most of his responsibilities in the late 1870s, and was the first person to have led Westerners to view the Moabite Stone in 1868. Sattam was also the first tribal sheikh to begin cultivating land in the 1860s, which began the sedentary settlement process of many of the biggest tribes in Jordan. In September 1881, after the reunification of the Al-Fayez family under Sattam, he was recognized by the Ottoman Administration as the Emir of Al-Jizah and the paramount Shaykh of the Bani Sakher clan.

== Sattam's legacy and influence over Jordan and the Beni Sakher ==
Sattam was known as a developer and a forward thinking Arabian leader who attempted to centralize control over his lands and the region. Sattam would attempt to create a new Arabian Kingdom through his strategic marriage to Aliya Diab, the sister of the paramount Sheikh of the Adwan, Ali Diab Al-Adwan. The marriage decreased tribal warfare through truce and got the two tribes closer in hopes of merging the Beni Sakher Emirate with the Adwanite Emirate into a kingdom. On the contrary, Sattam's pride might've been the reason why the Beni Sakher and the Adwan didn't grow closer than having a truce and exchanging gifts, as he refused Ali Diab's offer of his son marrying Sattam's sister, as Tristram recalls Sattam remarking;

" No; a Beni Sakk'r may raise an Adwan, but a daughter of the Sakk'r stoops not below her own tribe."

Thus, the two Emirates never merged, and the rivalry would rekindle in the Adwan rebellion after the establishment of the Hashemite Emirate of Transjordan under then Emir Abdullah who favored Sattam's son, Mithqal Pasha, over Ali Diab's son Sultan in his dealings.

Although his efforts towards peace and stability weren't fully successful, his legacy in reinstating control over the desert and his interest in agriculture would start a century long process of sedentariness in Jordan. As Alois Musil recalls in 1907:

"Even today, people still talk about how Prince Sattäm ibn Fendi of al-Fäjez himself punished wayward members of his own tribe, who made the roads of the territories under his sovereignty unsafe. The Beni Sakhr received tribute, al-häwa, from the inhabitants of el-Kerak, Ma'an, at-Tafile, Senfhe, also Selthe, as-Soubak, 'Ejme, and Dana."

This shows Sattam's little tolerance for his own tribe's transgressions on traders, travelers, and other innocents, as it was both immoral and detrimental for the long-term well being of the Emirate.

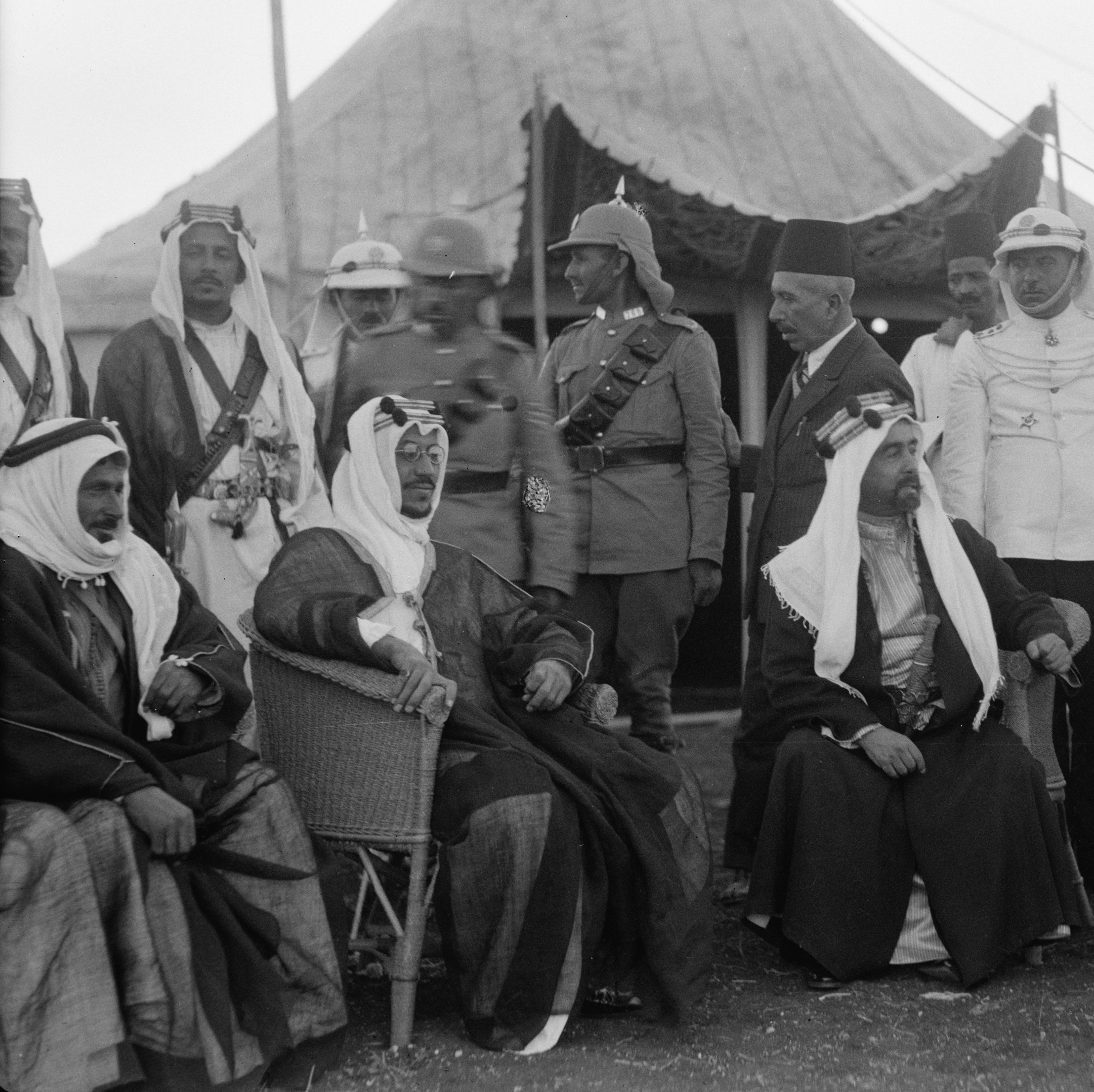
Sattam's son Mithqal (on the left), with King Abdullah I of Jordan, and King Saud of Saudi Arabia in 1934

Sattam would also play a key role in settling tribes into Jordan as permanent populations. One such example is Sattam's invitation to Mohammad Abu Zayd, who settled initially in Gaza with a large group of people who were avoiding Egyptian military conscription, to Sahab in Southern Amman, where the inhabitants of the area today are majority descendants from the tribes invited over by Sattam.

A major part of his legacy are his descendants, with the Sheikhdom of the Al-Fayez and the Beni Sakher now firmly in the Al-Sattam branch named after him. Sattam would become the ancestor of 6 of the following 7 paramount sheikhs of the Beni Sakher, and he is also the maternal grandfather of a branch of the Saudi Royal family from the marriage of his granddaughter Nouf to King Abdulaziz I. This branch of Al-Saud is regarded as one of the most influential, having members such as Faisal bin Thamir Al-Saud, Mamdouh bin Abdulaziz, Mashour bin Abdulaziz, and his daughter Sara who is married to Crown Prince Mohammad bin Salman.

== Travels with Klein and Tristram ==
In his 1881 trip to the land of Palestine, Henry B. Tristram was imprisoned in the Kerak Castle by the Sheikh of the Majalis. Sattam, who was expecting Henry's arrival, was notified of this, and decided to ride to Al-Kerak to free Henry, whom he had become friends with 13 years prior. Sattam appeared with only two other men, and he demanded that the Majalis hand over Henry and his crewmates, with the Majalis asking for ransom in return. According to Henry, Sattam replied to the Majalis calmly:

"You men of Kerak have hundreds of camels with their young, and thousands of sheep with their lambs, out on our plains. The Beni Sakk'r have been a wall to them all these months, and now you ask ransom for my brothers! Nay, my friends; but if we return not within two days, your camels and goats will travel farther, even to our camp, and I shall weep for the losses of you, my friends."

Henry and his crewmates were released the same day, and set off the next morning.

Later, when Tristram got the chance to visit Al-Fayez's tent he describes:

"Nothing could exceed the dignity and stateliness of the young sheikh in his own tent—"an awful don" T. pronounced him. He came to meet us, even held the stirrup as I dismounted, and conducted us to his open tent, Where already carpets and cushions had been spread for us, and such carpets!—the richest Persian, quite new, into which we sank as we sat down. "

They rested and had coffee and Mansaf before continuing their journey.

== See also ==
- Fendi Al-Fayez
- Mithqal Al-Fayez
- Akef Al-Fayez
- Faisal Al Fayez
- Al-Fayez
