= Mohammed bin Saud Al Kabeer =

Saudi royal and businessman (1908–1995)

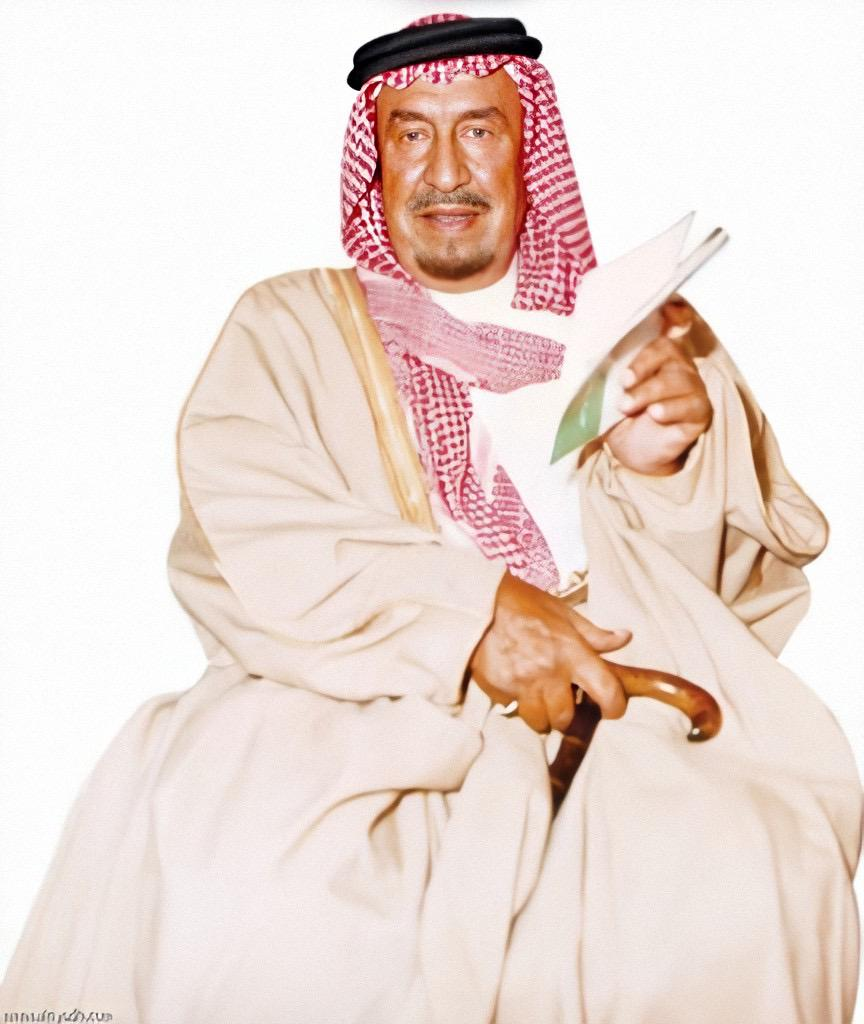
- Born: 1908; Riyadh
- Died: November 1995 (aged 86–87)
Names
- Mohammed bin Saud (Al Kabeer) bin Abdulaziz bin Saud bin Faisal Al Saud
- House: Al Saud
- Father: Saud Al Kabeer bin Abdulaziz Al Saud
- Mother: Noura bint Abdul Rahman Al Saud

Mohammed bin Saud Al Kabeer Al Saud (Arabic: محمد بن سعود الكبير آل سعود, romanized: Muḥammad ibn Suʿūd al-Kabīr Āl Suʿūd; 1908 – November 1995) was a Saudi royal and businessman. He was a nephew of King Abdulaziz, the patriarch of the Al Kabeer clan and a senior prince due to his in-depth tribal knowledge and connections. His nickname was Shaqran.

== Early life ==
Prince Mohammed was born in Riyadh in 1908. He was the youngest of Noura bint Abdul Rahman and Saud Al Kabeer's three children. Prince Mohammed's full-sisters were Hessa and Al Jawhara. The latter was one of the wives of King Faisal.

Prince Mohammed's mother, Noura, was the eldest daughter of the former Emir of Nejd, Abdul Rahman bin Faisal bin Turki. At the time of Prince Mohammed's birth his mother's younger brother Abdulaziz was ruling as Emir. His father, Saud, was the grandson of Emir Saud bin Faisal, who was the brother of Mohammed's maternal grandfather Emir Abdul Rahman bin Faisal.

== Activities, personal life and death ==
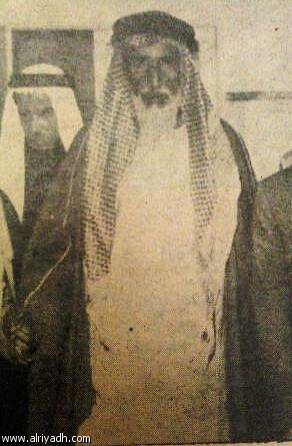
Saud Al Kabeer bin Abdulaziz, Prince Mohammed's father

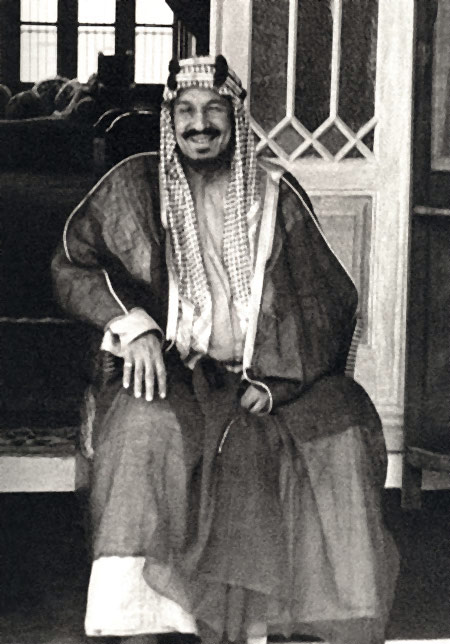
King Abdulaziz, his maternal uncle

Prince Mohammed joined some of the wars during the formation of the Kingdom of Saudi Arabia. He was one of the closest allies of Crown Prince Saud, later King Saud. Following the establishment of the state he mostly dealt with horse and camel breeding and business. In 1961 he founded the Yamama Cement company in Riyadh which became one of the best performing construction firms in the region. Although two of his sons, Salman and Abdulaziz, signed the document that demanded the abdication of King Saud in 1964, Prince Mohammed did not sign it; he was on a hunting trip during the incident. Throughout the reign of King Khalid, Prince Mohammed was ranked second in royal protocol behind the king.

Prince Mohammed had some eleven sons, most of who are involved in business activities. His progeny include:

- Abdullah, eldest son, married to Seeta bint Abdulaziz, daughter of King Abdulaziz and full sister of King Abdullah.
- Sultan was a businessman and ran the famous Almarai food products company.
- Turki was an assistant undersecretary at the Foreign Ministry for political affairs in 2000.
- Fahd bin Mohammed is married to Sara bint Sultan, daughter of former Crown Prince Sultan bin Abdulaziz.
- Mohammed's daughter, Noura bint Mohammed, is married to her father's maternal cousin Mashour bin Abdulaziz, son of Ibn Saud and brother to all subsequent kings of Saudi Arabia. Noura and Mashour's daughter, Sara bint Mashour, is married to Crown Prince Mohammed bin Salman.

In January 2018, eleven of Prince Mohammed's grandsons were arrested in Riyadh following their protest in front of the Qasr Palace or the Palace of Government, demanding the repeal of the royal order that stipulated stopping the payment of their bills for electricity and water. All of these princes were released one week later. However, Mohammad's grandson Abdulaziz bin Salman bin Mohammed and the latter's son, Salman bin Abdulaziz, have been in detention since early 2018.

Prince Mohammed died at age 90 in November 1998.

== Legacy ==
In Arar, a healthcare institution Prince Mohammed bin Saud Al Kabeer disease and dialysis center is named after Prince Mohammed. In Riyadh, an annual horse race named the cup of Prince Mohammed bin Saud Al Kabeer is organized.
