= Expedition to Najd (1910) =

1910 conflict in Arabia

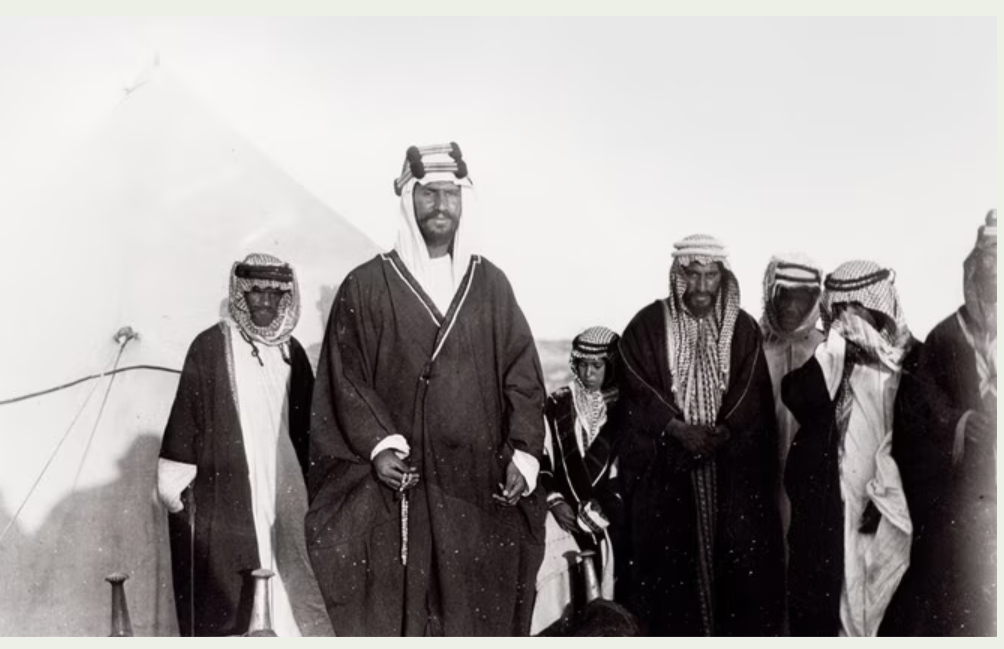
- Portrait of Ibn Saud in 1910
| Date | 1910 |
| Location | Najd, Emirate of Riyadh |
| Result | Sharifian victory |
| Territorial changes | The Sharifate of Mecca seized Najd and established a truce |

Belligerents
| Sharifate of Mecca; Supported by: Ottoman Empire | Emirate of Riyadh |

Commanders and leaders
| Hussein bin Ali | Ibn Saud; Sa'ad (POW) |

Expedition to Najd 1910, Hussein bin Ali the Sharif of Mecca, launched a campaign against the Najd region, specifically against the Emirate of Riyadh and Ibn Saud. He won the campaign and took control of it.

== Background ==
During the Arab Revolt, Hussein bin Ali, the Sharif of Mecca, cooperated with Britain in the World War I. He expanded the influence of the Hejaz and led a revolt against the Ottoman Empire. At the same time, Ibn Saud in Najd, ruler of the Emirate of Riyadh, grew resentful of Hussein because he was receiving British support and strengthening his power through them, which led to the first skirmishes between them.

In early 1910, Sharif Hussein demanded an annual payment of 900 Ottoman pounds from Ibn Saud, but Ibn Saud refused.

== Battle ==
In 1910, Hussein bin Ali led a small army on a campaign against Najd and captured Sa'ad bin AbdulRahman, the brother of Ibn Saud. Ibn Saud then agreed to a truce, offering to pay 6,000 dollars to Hussein and to accept nominal Ottoman sovereignty over Najd.
