= Sara bint Mashour Al Saud =

Saudi royal

- Born: 1988 (age 37–38); Saudi Arabia
- Spouse: Mohammed bin Salman (m. 2008)
- Issue: Prince Salman; Prince Mashour; Princess Fahda; Princess Noura; Prince Abdulaziz
Names
- Sara bint Mashour bin Abdulaziz bin Abdul Rahman Al Saud
- House: Al Saud
- Father: Prince Mashour bin Abdulaziz Al Saud
- Mother: Noura bint Mohammed bin Saud Al Kabeer Al Saud

Sara bint Mashour Al Saud (Arabic: سارة بنت مشهور آل سعود) is a member of the Saudi royal family and wife of Saudi Crown Prince Mohammed bin Salman, who is her first cousin. She is a granddaughter of King Abdulaziz.

== Biography ==
Sara bint Mashour is the daughter of Prince Mashour bin Abdulaziz Al Saud and Noura bint Mohammed Saud Al Kabeer. Her father is the son of King Abdulaziz and Nouf bint Nawaf bin Nuri Al Shaalan. Her mother, Noura, is the daughter of Mohammed bin Saud Al Kabeer and granddaughter of Noura bint Abdul Rahman Al Saud and Saud Al Kabeer.

Princess Sara married Prince Mohammed on 6 April 2008. They have five children, three boys and two girls: Prince Salman, Prince Mashour, Princess Fahda, Princess Noura and Prince Abdulaziz (born April 2021).

According to Ali al-Ahmed of Institute for Gulf Affairs, based on anonymous sources within the Al Saud family, it was reported that Princess Sara had been subject to domestic violence since the early days of her marriage. Similar allegations were also mentioned in the book Saudi Bodyguard by Mark Young who had worked for the family. In 2022, The Economist reported that on at least one occasion, Mohammed beat Sara so severely that she required medical treatment.
