= Mashour bin Abdulaziz Al Saud =

Saudi royal and businessman (born 1942)

- Born: 1942 (age 83–84)
- Spouse: Noura bint Mohammed bin Saud Al Kabeer Al Saud; Haya bint Faraj Shabeeb (divorced)
- Issue: Sara bint Mashour; Luluwah bint Mashour
Names
- Mashour bin Abdulaziz bin Abdul Rahman Al Saud
- House: Al Saud
- Father: King Abdulaziz
- Mother: Nuf bint Nawwaf bin Nuri Al Shaalan

Mashour bin Abdulaziz Al Saud (Arabic: مشهور بن عبد العزيز آل سعود; born 1942) is a member of the House of Saud and a member of Saudi Arabia's Allegiance Council. He is a half-brother of King Salman and the father-in-law of Crown Prince Mohammed bin Salman.

== Biography ==
Prince Mashour was born in 1942 to King Abdulaziz and Nouf bint Nawwaf bin Nuri Al Shaalan. They married in November 1935. Nouf was a member of the Ruwala tribe based in northwestern Saudi Arabia, Transjordan and Syria and was the granddaughter of Nuri Al Shalaan, the Emir of the tribe. Prince Mashour has two full brothers; Prince Thamir and Prince Mamdouh.

Prince Mashour is a businessman. In August 2009, the Washington Institute for Near East Policy had identified him as a potential successor to King Abdullah of Saudi Arabia.

His wife is Noura bint Mohammed bin Saud Al Kabir, daughter of Mohammed bin Saud and granddaughter of Noura bint Abdul Rahman Al Saud and Saud Al Kabir. His daughter Sara is married to Saudi Crown Prince Mohammad bin Salman Al Saud.
