= Saud bin Faisal =

Saud bin Faisal may refer to:

- Saud bin Faisal bin Turki, ruler of the Second Saudi State in 1871 and between 1873 and 1875
- Saud bin Faisal bin Abdulaziz, foreign minister of Saudi Arabia between 1975 and 2015
