= Saud Al Kabeer bin Abdulaziz Al Saud =

Saudi royal and politician (1882–1959)

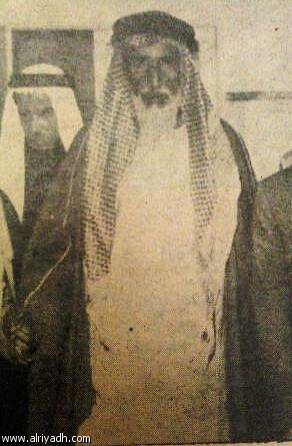
- Born: 1882
- Died: 1959 (aged 76–77)
- Spouse: Noura bint Abdul Rahman (m. 1905; died 1950) Hessa bint Abdulaziz (after 1950)
- Issue: List: Abdulaziz bin Saud; Abdul Rahman bin Saud; Mohammed bin Saud; Turki bin Saud; Fahd bin Saud; Sultan bin Saud; Abdullah bin Saud; Al Jawhara bint Saud
Names
- Saud bin Abdulaziz bin Saud bin Faisal bin Turki
- House: Al Saud
- Father: Abdulaziz bin Saud Al Saud
- Mother: Wahda bint Hazam Al Hithlain

Saud Al Kabeer bin Abdulaziz Al Saud (Arabic: سعود الكبير بن عبدالعزيز آل سعود Suʿūd Al Kabīr ibn ʿAbdulʿazīz Āl Suʿūd; 1882–1959) was a grandson of Saud bin Faisal bin Turki and a distant nephew and important supporter of King Abdulaziz, founder of Saudi Arabia. Prince Saud was one of the most known Najdi people. Through his marriages he was the brother-in-law, and later a son-in-law, of King Abdulaziz. Saud was married for 45 years to King Abdulaziz's eldest sister Noura bint Abdul Rahman, and after her death in 1950 he married the King's daughter Princess Hessa.

== Early life and activities ==
Prince Saud was born in Riyadh in 1882. He was the eldest son of Abdulaziz bin Saud Al Saud and Wahda bint Hazam Al Hithlain of Ajman. His grandfather, Saud bin Faisal bin Turki, and great-grandfather, Faisal bin Turki bin Abdullah, were the rulers of the Second Saudi State.

Following the capture of Riyadh by the Rashidi Emir Muhammad bin Abdullah in 1891 Saud and his relatives were arrested and taken to Hail. In 1904 Abdulaziz took Qasim where he found that Prince Saud and his five brothers under the rule of the Al Rashid. Abdulaziz brought back all of his nephews\\ to Riyadh and made them part of his circle, but gave them no political position.An internal family dispute within the Al Saud family resulted in Prince Saud and some of his brothers and cousins leaving Riyadh to Al-Kharj. In 1910 when Abdulaziz was not in Riyadh, Prince Saud and his brothers left Riyadh and joined the rebellious Ajman tribe with whom they established a base in Hariq and Hauta in the south of Riyadh. In 1912 a minor back and forth battles between them and after that a reconciliation was made. Prince Saud and his brother Mohammed chose to return with him, but one of his brothers escaped to Hasa while the others chose refuge with Sharif Hussein of Hejaz who was the competitor of Abdulaziz.

Following this incident Prince Saud played a vital role in uniting the kingdom of Saudi Arabia, having fought side by side with Abdulaziz in many battles and having led the armies to reclaim many lands. He helped reclaim Ha'il, Jeddah, and Sablah. He played a pivotal role in the battles of the Al Qassim region. He also led the Saudi army to reclaim the west coast of the Arabian peninsula including Rabigh, Yanbu, and Al Wajh and Duba. Prince Saud and Abdulaziz's brother Muhammad bin Abdul Rahman led the forces which helped Abdulaziz in the battle of Kanzan in 1915. Only through their assistance Abdulaziz managed to defeat the Al Ajman tribe who surrounded Abdulaziz's forces for almost six months after killing Abdulaziz's younger brother Saad bin Abdul Rahman and wounding Abdulaziz.. Because he was respected and loved by the people, and also due to his vast knowledge of religion, King Abdulaziz would rely on Prince Saud to dispute tribal issues.

== Personal life ==
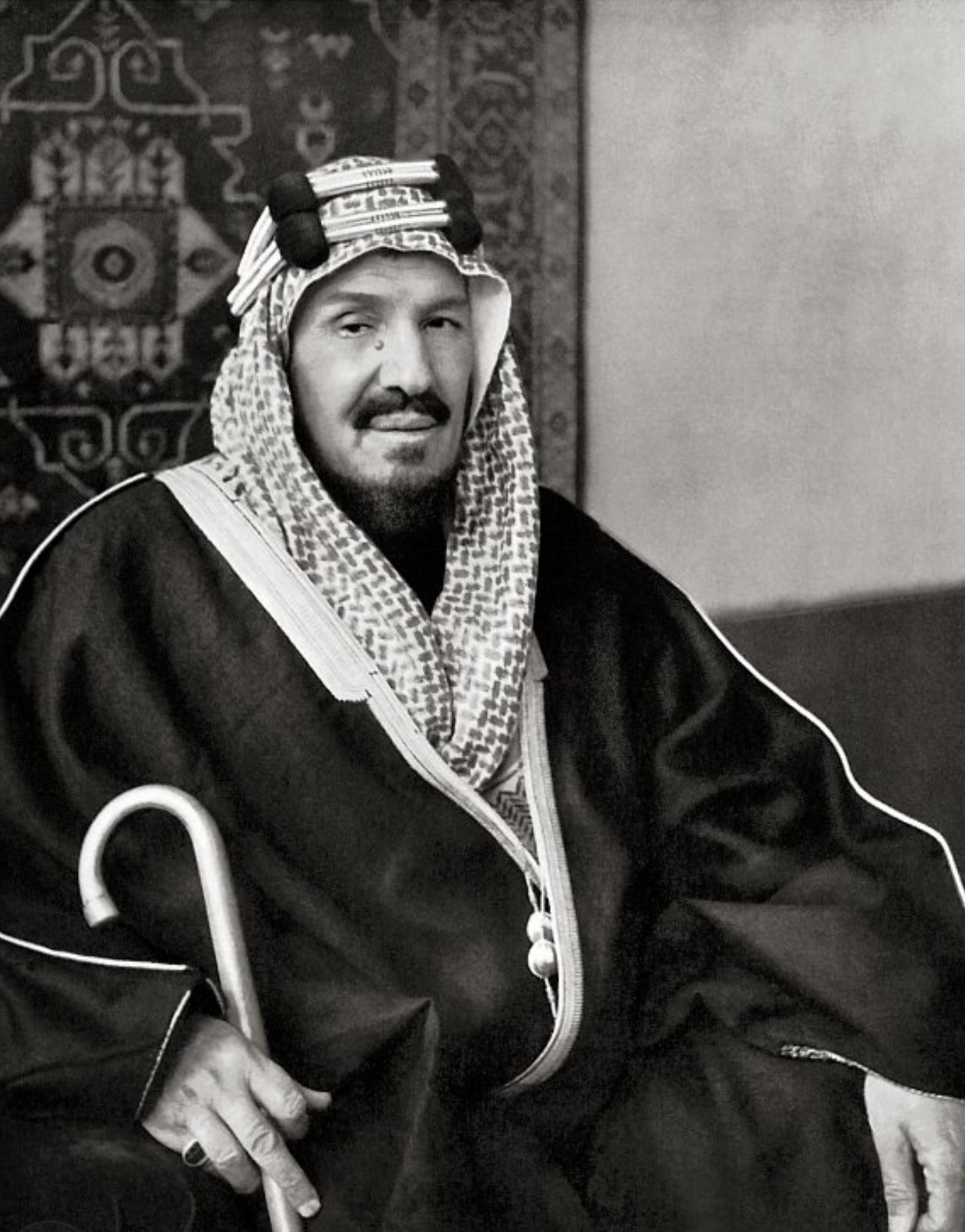
King Abdulaziz, brother-in-law, and then father-in-law, of Prince Saud

Prince Saud married to Noura bint Abdul Rahman, the daughter of Abdul Rahman bin Faisal and sister of King Abdulaziz. Saud's brother, Mohammed, also married a daughter of Abdul Rahman, Mounira. And later on after Noura's death, Saud married Hessa, the daughter of King Abdulaziz. Prince Saud and Princess Noura had two daughters, Hassa and Al Jawhara, and a son, Mohammed who was a senior and respected prince due to his powerful tribal knowledge and connections. Princess Al Jawhara was one of King Faisal's spouses. They married in October 1935.

Prince Saud and his wife, Noura, lived in Sharia Palace in Alkharag city. Then, they moved to the newly built Al Shamsiah Palace, outside Riyadh which is in the Al Murabba neighborhood.

Prince Saud died in 1959.
