= Mamdouh bin Abdulaziz Al Saud =

Saudi businessman and royal (1940–2023)

- ممدوح بن عبد العزيز آل سعود

Governor of Tabuk Province
- In office 1986–1987
- Monarch: King Fahd
- Preceded by: Abdul Majeed bin Abdulaziz
- Succeeded by: Fahd bin Sultan

Personal details
- Born: 1940 Riyadh, Saudi Arabia
- Died: 30 November 2023 (aged 83) Jeddah, Saudi Arabia
- Spouse: Sultana bint Abdullah bin Abdulrahman Aldakhil (m. 1961) Faiza bint Nayef bin Nawaf bin Al Nuri Al Shaalan (died 2016)
- Children: Prince Nayef; Prince Khalid
- Parents: King Abdulaziz (father); Nouf bint Nawaf bin Nuri Al Shaalan (mother)
- House: Al Saud

Mamdouh bin Abdulaziz Al Saud (Arabic: ممدوح بن عبد العزيز آل سعود; 1940 – 30 November 2023) was a Saudi Arabian businessman, the governor of the Tabuk Province, and a member of the Saudi royal family.

== Early life ==
Prince Mamdouh was born in 1940 to King Abdulaziz and Nouf bint Nawaf bin Nuri Al Shaalan. His parents married in November 1935. Nouf was a member of the Ruwala tribe based in northwestern Arabia, Transjordan and Syria and was the granddaughter of two great north Arabian Emirs, Sattam bin Fendi Al Fayez and Nuri bin Hazaa Al Shalaan.

Prince Mamdouh had two full brothers; Prince Thamir and Prince Mashhur.

== Career ==
Prince Mamdouh was the governor of Tabuk Province from 1986 to 1987. He was succeeded by Prince Fahd bin Sultan as governor. Then Prince Mamdouh served as the director of Saudi Center of Strategic Studies from 1994 to 2004. During his term as the director of Strategic Studies, Prince Mamdouh also participated in the meetings of the Consultative Council in Jeddah. He was a businessman and a member of the Allegiance Council.

== Personal life and death ==
In 1961, Prince Mamdouh married Sultana bint Abdullah bin Abdulrahman Aldakhil.

On 30 November 2023, Mamdouh's son, Khaled, announced that Mamdouh had died earlier that morning, at the age of 83. Khaled mentioned his life-long support for his half-brother King Salman and Crown Prince Mohammad bin Salman.

Political offices
Preceded by Office established	Chairman of the Bureau of Strategic Studies; 1997–2004	Succeeded by Office abolished
