= Sara bint Ahmed Al Sudairi =

Saudi royal and mother of King Abdulaziz

- Born: 1860; Al-Ahsa
- Died: 1910 (aged 49–50); Riyadh
- Burial: Al Oud cemetery, Riyadh
- Spouse: Abdullah bin Hamad bin Abdul Jabbar; Abdul Rahman bin Faisal Al Saud
- Issue: List: Faisal Noura Abdulaziz Bazza Haya Saad
Names
- Sarah bint Ahmed bin Muhammad bin Turki bin Suleiman Al Sudairi
- House: Sudairi (by birth); Al Saud (by marriage)
- Father: Ahmed bin Muhammad bin Turki Al Sudairi
- Mother: Hessa bint Muhanna bin Saleh Al Nuwairan

Sara bint Ahmed Al Sudairi (Arabic: سارة بنت أحمد السديري Sārah bint Aḥmad as-Sudayrī; c. 1860 – 1 January 1910) was a Saudi royal. She was a member of the Al Sudairi family and the wife of Abdul Rahman bin Faisal, who was the last ruler of the Second Saudi State. Sara was the mother of King Abdulaziz, also known as Ibn Saud, who was the founder of Saudi Arabia.

== Biography ==
Sara bint Ahmed was a member of the Al Sudairi family, who are part of the Dawasir tribe settled in Al Ghat, an oasis town located in central Arabia nearly 250 kilometers northwest of Riyadh.

Sara's mother was Hessa bint Muhanna bin Saleh Al Nuwairan. Her father was Ahmed bin Muhammad bin Turki bin Suleiman Al Sudairi, who was nicknamed Ahmed Al Kabeer (The Great). He was assigned by Faisal bin Turki, the ruler of the Second Saudi State, to different regions as an administrator, including Al Ahsa where Sara was born. He also served in Al Ghat and Buraimi before his death in 1860. Sara's uncle, Abdullah bin Muhammad, also served in Al Ahsa, as its governor, under Faisal bin Turki.

Sara had six brothers: Muhammad, Turki, Abdul Mohsen, Abdulaziz, Saad, and Abdul Rahman, and two sisters, Falwa and Noura. Of them, Muhammad, was made the governor of Al Ahsa following the death of his father, who had been in the post until his death. Another, Turki, was the governor of Saudi Oman. Sara's sister Falwa married Muhammad bin Faisal bin Turki, and Noura was the spouse of Jiluwi bin Turki bin Abdullah. Noura and Jiluwi were the paternal grandparents of Al Jawhara bint Musaed who was the mother of King Khalid, Prince Muhammad and Princess Al Anoud.

Sara's first husband, Abdullah bin Hamad bin Abdul Jabbar, died, and they did not have any children. Then she married Abdul Rahman bin Faisal. Her children from this second marriage were Faisal, Noura, Abdulaziz, Bazza, Haya and Saad. She accompanied her husband and children when they were forced to leave Riyadh in 1891.

Sara was tall like her son, Abdulaziz. She died in Riyadh in late 1910. However, there is another report stating her death year as 1908. She was buried in Al Oud cemetery in Riyadh.
