= Noura bint Abdul Rahman Al Saud =

Saudi royal (1875–1950)

- Born: 1875; Riyadh, Emirate of Nejd
- Died: July 1950 (aged 74–75); Riyadh, Saudi Arabia
- Burial: Al Oud cemetery, Riyadh
- Spouse: Saud Al Kabir bin Abdulaziz Al Saud (m. 1905)
- Issue: Hessa; Al Jawhara; Mohammed
Names
- Noura bint Abdul Rahman bin Faisal bin Turki Al Saud
- House: Al Saud
- Father: Abdul Rahman bin Faisal, Emir of Nejd
- Mother: Sara bint Ahmed Al Sudairi

Noura bint Abdul Rahman Al Saud (Arabic: نورة بنت عبد الرحمن آل سعود Noura bint ʿAbd ar Raḥman Āl Suʿūd; 1875 – July 1950) was the eldest daughter of Abdul Rahman bin Faisal, Emir of Nejd, and the elder sister and adviser of King Abdulaziz of Saudi Arabia.

== Early life ==
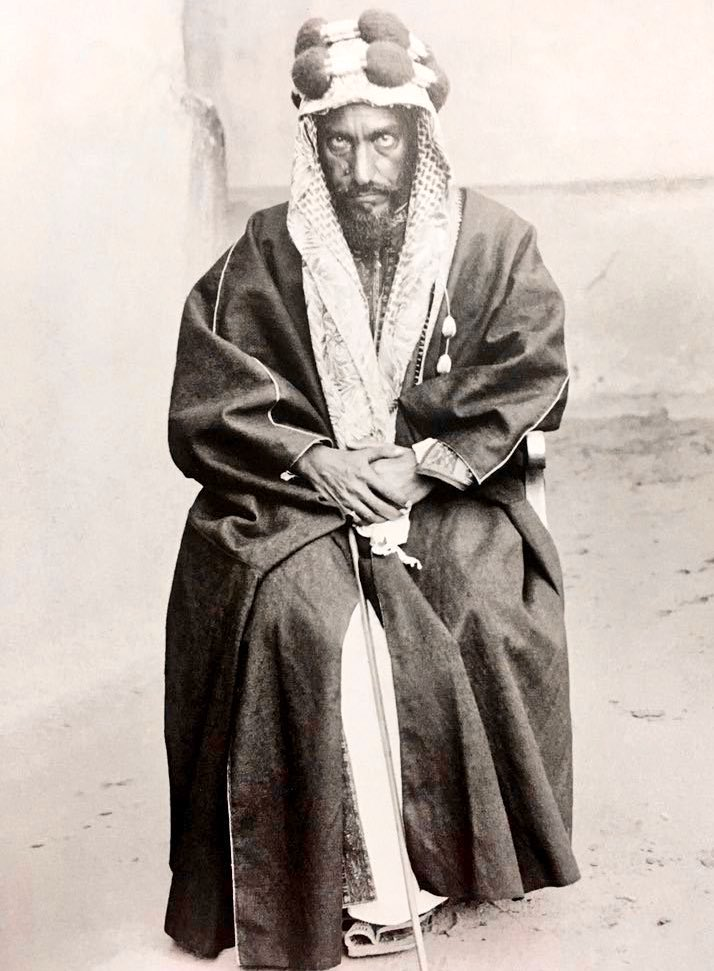
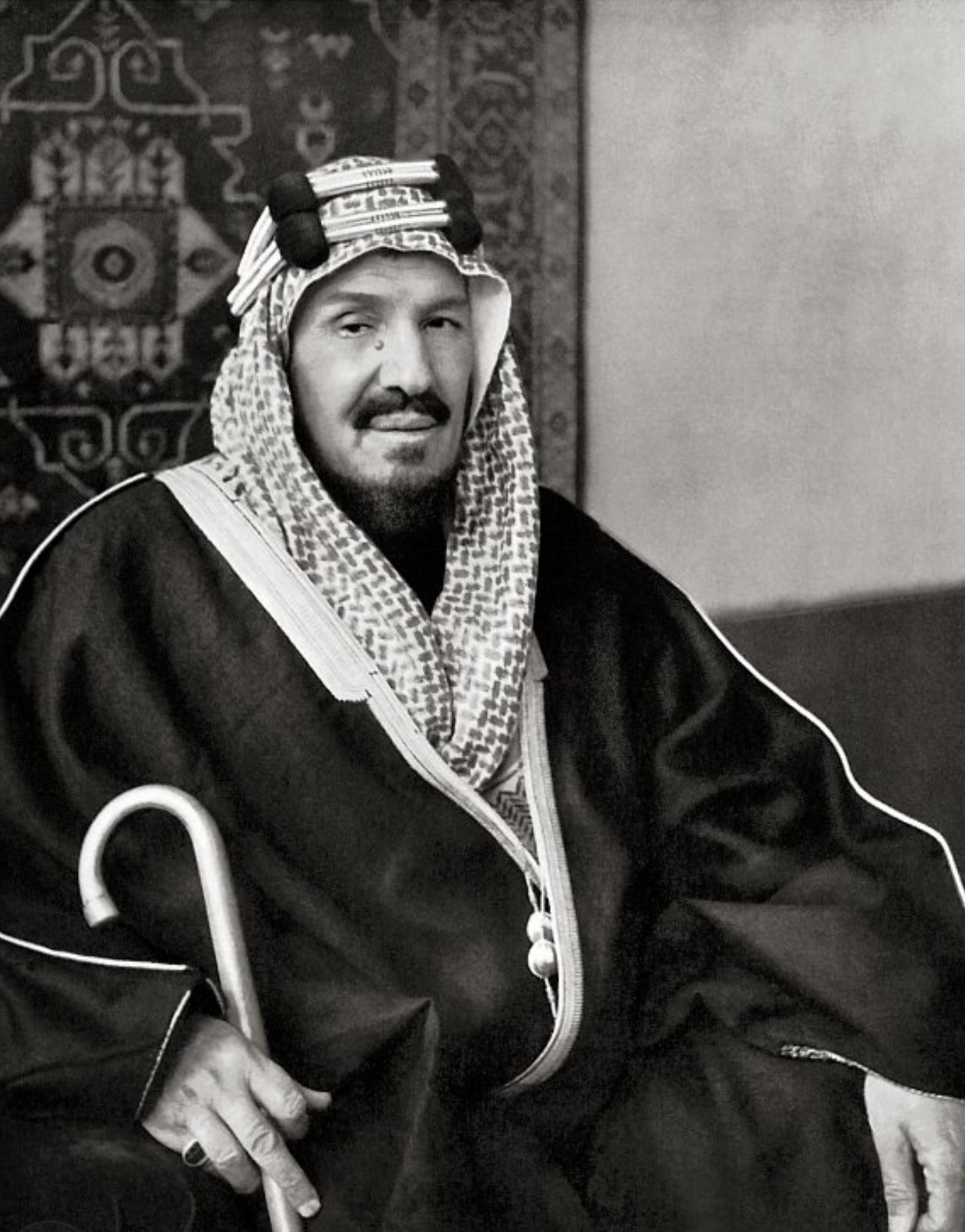
Noura's father Abdul Rahman bin Faisal, Emir of Nejd (left), and her brother Abdulaziz bin Abdul Rahman, King of Saudi Arabia

Noura was born in Riyadh in 1875. She was the eldest daughter of Abdul Rahman bin Faisal bin Turki and full sister of Abdulaziz bin Abdul Rahman, who would establish the modern Saudi Arabia and rule as its first king. Noura's other full siblings included Faisal, Bazza, Haya and Saad. Their mother was a member of the Sudairi family, Sara bint Ahmed, who died in 1908 or 1910. Noura's maternal grandmother was Hessa bint Muhanna bin Saleh Al Nuwairan. Noura also had a number of half-siblings from her father's other marriages, including Muhammad, Abdullah, Ahmed, and Musaid.

Noura and her brother Abdulaziz attended a mosque school in Riyadh when their father was in Hail province under the Al Rashid rule. There she learned to read and write from her early years which was a very rare quality for an Arab girl at the time. In 1891 Noura left Riyadh with her family members when her father was forced into exile.

== Relations and activities ==
King Abdulaziz and Noura were very close to each other. It is well known that on several occasions, King Abdulaziz identified himself in public by proclaiming "I am the brother of Noura." Muhammad bin Abdul Rahman, another of her younger brothers, also used to say the same.

Noura was reported to have the "minds of 40 men" and great wisdom. She encouraged Abdulaziz to regain the leadership of the region when the family was in exile in Kuwait. Her charismatic personality and strong political ideas led to King Abdulaziz's paying attention to her opinion about many crucial issues. Eventually, she became one of his main advisors and even took his place in running the state when he was unable to do so.

She was also known to be quite progressive and outspoken. For instance, when the telephone was first introduced to the country, many Islamic clerics rejected it and considered it to be a tool of the devil, but she actively supported its use and argued that it was an amazing device that they would not be able to live without. She also played an important role in teaching her nephews and nieces the system of social norms. It is reported that whenever one of them misbehaved as a child, the King would send him to their aunt for discipline. In addition, Noura was a pioneer in charity activities and the founder of the first charity program for the poor and orphans in the country.

Dame Violet Dickson, a Briton, met Noura in 1937 and stated that she was the most charismatic and important personality in the Arabian Peninsula at that period. Princess Alice, Countess of Athlone, a British royal who visited Saudi Arabia in 1938, also met Noura and stated that she "is about sixty and said to be his [King Abdulaziz's] chief adviser, a fine, handsome woman."

== Personal life ==
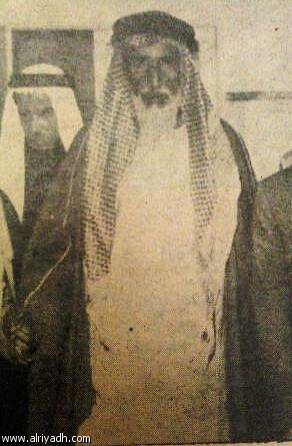
Noura's husband, Saud Al Kabir

Noura bint Abdul Rahman married Saud bin Abdulaziz bin Saud bin Faisal, known as Saud Al Kabir, in 1905. He was from the Al Kabir branch of the House of Saud, consisting of descendants of Saud bin Faisal bin Turki, Emir of Nejd from 1871 to 1875 and elder brother of Noura's father Emir Abdul Rahman bin Faisal.

In 1903, the Al Kabir branch began to question Abdulaziz's right to rule and took refuge from their mothers' tribe, Ajman. Later Abdulaziz pardoned Saud, the most powerful surviving Al Kabir family member. Saud Al Kabir then married Noura. In other words, Saud Al Kabir's loyalty to Abdulaziz was secured as a result of his marriage to Noura bint Abdul Rahman. Since then, the Al Kabir branch has become influential, but they have been mostly kept away from political power. On the other hand, Saud Al Kabir served as the governor of Al-Qassim Province following the foundation of Saudi Arabia in 1932.

Noura and her husband had three children: two daughters, Hessa and Al Jawhara, followed by a son, Mohammed. Prince Mohammed was a senior and respected prince due to his powerful tribal knowledge and connections. Princess Al Jawhara was the third spouse of Noura's nephew King Faisal. They married in October 1935.

Noura's grandchildren include the Saudi businessman Sultan bin Mohammad Al Kabir and Princess Mashael, daughter of King Faisal and Al Jawhara.

Noura's family lived in Sharia Palace, Al Kharj. Following the establishment of the Kingdom the family moved to the newly built Al Shamsiah Palace, outside Riyadh, which is in the Al Murabba neighborhood.

== Death ==
Noura died in July 1950 at the age of 75, a few years before King Abdulaziz. She was buried in Al Oud cemetery in Riyadh. King Abdulaziz was buried in the same cemetery next to her in 1953.

== Legacy ==
Princess Noura University was named in 2008 by King Abdullah in her memory. The university is considered to be one of the largest universities of its type and can accommodate 50,000 female students. It reflected King Abdullah's appreciation for his aunt Noura bint Abdul Rahman.
