= Thamir bin Abdulaziz Al Saud =

Saudi royal (1937–1958)

- Born: 1937; Riyadh, Saudi Arabia
- Died: 27 June 1958 (aged 20–21); San Francisco, United States
- Issue: Faisal bin Thamir Al Saud
Names
- Thamir bin Abdulaziz bin Abdul Rahman bin Faisal bin Turki bin Abdullah bin Muhammad bin Saud
- House: Al Saud
- Father: King Abdulaziz
- Mother: Nouf bint Nawaf bin Nuri Al Shaalan

Thamir bin Abdulaziz Al Saud (Arabic: ثامر بن عبد العزيز آل سعود; 1937 – 27 June 1958) was a member of the House of Saud. He committed suicide at a young age and therefore, held no important cabinet position.

== Biography ==
Prince Thamir was born in 1937 to King Abdulaziz and Nouf bint Nawaf bin Nuri Al Shaalan, who had married in November 1935. Nouf bint Nawaf was from the Ruwala tribe based in the northwestern Saudi Arabia, Transjordan and Syria and was the granddaughter of Nuri Al Shalaan, the Emir of the tribe.

Prince Thamir had two full brothers: Prince Mamdouh and Prince Mashhur. Prince Thamir committed suicide in 1958.

Prince Thamir had a son, Faisal, who was among the members of the Allegiance Commission. Faisal bin Thamir's ex-wife is Seeta bint Abdullah, a daughter of former ruler of Saudi Arabia, King Abdullah.
