= Sa'ad bin Abdul Rahman Al Saud =

Saudi royal, brother and supporter of King Abdulaziz (1890–1915)

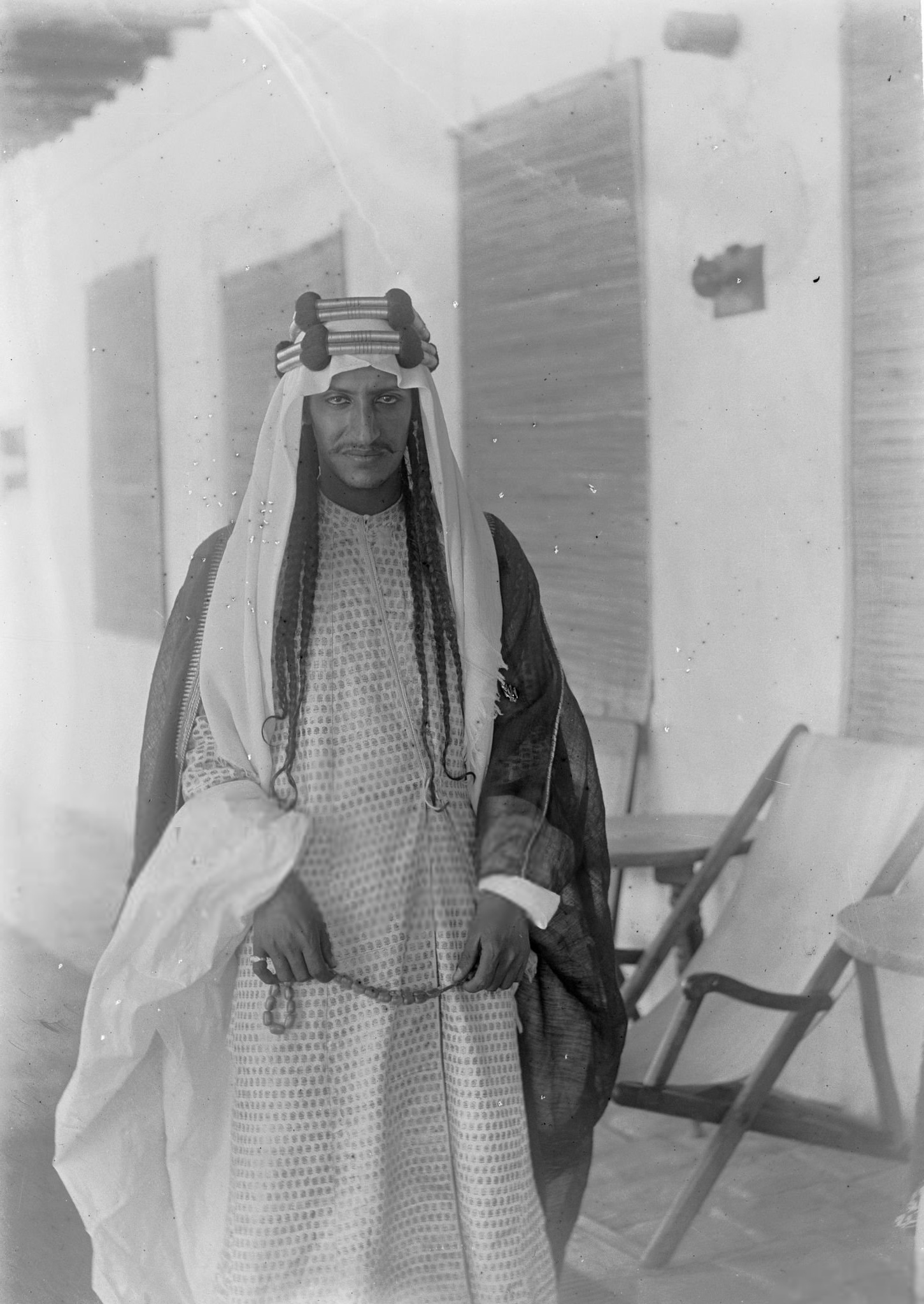
- Photograph by William Shakespear, 1911
- Born: 1890
- Died: 1915 (aged 24–25); Al Ahsa
- Issue: List: Prince Faisal; Prince Fahd; Prince Saud; Princess Sara
Names
- Sa'ad bin Abdul Rahman bin Faisal
- House: Al Saud
- Father: Abdul Rahman bin Faisal, Emir of Nejd
- Mother: Sara bint Ahmed Al Sudairi
- Military career
- Allegiance: Saudi Arabia
- Conflicts: Battle of Kanzan †

Sa'ad bin Abdul Rahman Al Saud (Arabic: سعد بن عبد الرحمن آل سعود;1890–1915) was the brother of Abdulaziz, Emir of Nejd (who later founded the Kingdom of Saudi Arabia). He was one of Abdulaziz's most devoted supporters and a key lieutenant in his early military campaigns.

== Early life ==
Sa'ad was born in 1890. He was the youngest son of the reigning Emir of Nejd, Abdul Rahman bin Faisal, from his marriage to Sara bint Ahmed Al Sudairi. His full-siblings were Faisal, Noura, Abdulaziz and Bazza and Haya. He also had a number of half-siblings from his father's other marriages, including Muhammad, Abdullah, Ahmed, and Musaid, who all had roles in the Saudi government.

The Al Saud family were exiled shortly after Sa'ad's birth, settling in Kuwait. After his brother Abdulaziz captured Riyadh, Sa'ad returned there. Kuwaiti ruler Mubarak Al Sabah sent nearly seventy warriors to Riyadh who were led by Sa'ad.

== Arrest and death ==
In 1912 Sa'ad was sent by Emir Abdulaziz to meet Hussein bin Ali, Sharif of Mecca, who came to Nifi to build a good relationship with Abdulaziz. However, Sa'ad was attacked and captured in Al 'Iridh area by the Al Shiyabiyn clan, who belonged to the 'Utaybah tribe. His companion Faraj ibn Lihif was killed in the same incident. Sa'ad was brought to Sharif Hussein who sent his envoy Khalid ibn Luai, Amir of Al Khurmah, to Emir Abdulaziz demanding that he should accept the sovereignty of the Ottoman government in the region as well as pay an annual sum of money to the Ottoman government for Sa'ad's release. Abdulaziz accepted all these requests signing a paper, and Sa'ad was released.

Sa'ad was killed in the battle of Kanzan against the Ajman tribe in 1915. In the same battle which occurred in Al Ahsa region Emir Abdulaziz was wounded. The Ajman tribe forces were led by Rakan bin Hithlain, the maternal great-grandfather of the Saudi crown prince Mohammed bin Salman.

== Personal life ==
One of Sa'ad's wives, Sara bint Abdullah Al Sheikh, was the sister of Tarfa bint Abdullah, mother of King Faisal. Another of his wives was Jawhara bint Saad Al Sudairi. Following the death of Sa'ad, she married Abdulaziz, with whom she had at least four children.

Sa'ad's sons, Faisal, Fahd, and Saud, were taken in by Abdulaziz and raised as part of his own family. They later married King Abdulaziz's daughters. Of them, Prince Faisal bin Sa'ad married the King's daughter Sara bint Abdulaziz. Sara's half-sister Al Anoud married two sons of Sa'ad bin Abdul Rahman. She first married Sa'ad's eldest son, Prince Fahd. After they divorced, she married his brother Saud. Fahd bin Sa'ad was a close confidant of King Faisal and was appointed governor of Asir Province on 8 June 1969, replacing Turki bin Ahmed Al Sudairi, a distant relative, in the post. One of Sa'ad's daughters, Sara, was the spouse of Muhammad bin Abdulaziz. Sa'ad's grandson, Bandar bin Saud, a former air force pilot, was among the victims in the Swissair Flight 111 accident on his way from New York City to Geneva on 2 September 1998.
