= Saud bin Faisal Al Saud (1833–1875) =

Ruler of Second Saudi State in 1871 and from 1873 to 1875

Emir of Nejd
- Reign: 1873–1875
- Predecessor: Abdullah bin Faisal
- Successor: Abdul Rahman bin Faisal
- Reign: 1871
- Predecessor: Abdullah bin Faisal
- Successor: Abdullah bin Faisal
- Born: 1833
- Died: 1875 (aged 41–42)
- Issue: List: Muhammad; Abdulaziz; Saud; Abdullah; Abdul Rahman
Names
- Saud bin Faisal bin Turki bin Abdullah bin Muhammad bin Saud
- House: Al Saud
- Father: Faisal bin Turki bin Abdullah Al Saud

Saud bin Faisal Al Saud (Arabic: سعود بن فيصل بن تركي آل سعود, romanized: Suud bin Faysal bin Turkî al-Suud), also known as Imam Saud (Arabic: إمام الدولة السعودية الثانية), (1833—1875) was the ruler of the Second Saudi State in 1871 and 1873–75. He joined alliances with foreign tribes and revolted against his half-brother Abdullah. His rule was short-lived and Abdullah overthrew him. Saud gained power again in 1873 but died two years later. His reign was notable for the infighting in the House of Saud which he initiated.

== Early life ==
Saud was born in 1833. The mother of Saud and his much younger full-brother Abdul Rahman was part of the Ajman, a Bedouin tribe inhabiting the desert to the southeast of Riyadh. Saud had two half-brothers, Abdullah and Muhammad, whose mother came from the Saud family.

== Rebellion ==
Abdullah as the oldest son of Faisal had been made designated heir and chief military commander while Saud was sent to al-Kharj in southern Najd as governor, partly to reduce the developing friction between the two brothers.

However, Saud proved outstandingly successful and his reputation soon eclipsed that of his brother, whose claim to the succession was not validated by any great success or ability in politics, whereas Saud had developed a strong power base in the area of al Kharj and a following among the Ajman tribe of his mother. Nevertheless, neither his father nor the Ottoman authorities approved his desire to be the ruler of the Emirate of Nejd. Saud's demands were acceptable to the British authorities who thought that it would be much easy to control Saud rather than Abdullah.

After Faisal's death in 1865, Abdullah became Imam, but was immediately challenged by the ambitious Saud. Saud claimed that he was qualified to rule the state due to his prior appointment as the governor of al-Kharj by his father, Faisal. Saud had left Riyadh and gathered supporters among the tribes of Al Hasa in the east, including the Ajman tribe. However, the Wahhabi leader, Abdul Rahman bin Hasan, did not endorse the rebellion of Saud and supported Abdullah as the legitimate ruler.

Ali Haydar Midhat, son of Midhat Pasha who was the governor of Iraq, wrote "Saud desired to capture Nejd by the support of British and some local leaders. Therefore, he recruited soldiers from the region and revolted against his brother, Abdullah." They first fought in the battle of Mutala in 1866-67, and Saud was defeated and escaped to Trucial Oman. However, in December 1870, Saud, aided by the rulers of Oman, Abu Dhabi and Bahrain, defeated the forces of Abdullah in the battle of Juda and captured his brother other Muhammad. Upon this events Sheikh Abd Al Latif bin Abdul Rahman, grandson of Muhammad ibn Abdul Wahab, supported Saud as the new Emir and also, declared him as Imam.

Abdullah fled Riyadh and Saud proclaimed himself Imam in May 1871. The same year Saud's brother Muhammad was released from the prison in Dammam by the Ottomans.

== Failed kingship ==
Soon after, another rebellion shook the kingdom. Saud was forced out by his uncle Abdullah bin Turki who took the capital. Saud had also estranged the population by his reliance on tribes from the east.

== Return of Abdullah bin Faisal ==
In the meantime, Abdullah had requested help from Midhat Pasha, the Ottoman governor of Baghdad. Midhat Pasha took advantage of the opportunity to sweep into the province of Al Hasa, where Muhammad bin Faisal was held prisoner by Saud's son, Abdulaziz. Muhammad was released, and eventually the two brothers Abdullah and Muhammad were able to make their way back to Riyadh. However, Saud, along with his Ajman followers, retook Riyadh in January 1873 and Abdullah and Muhammad were sent into exile among the Mutayr and Utaiba tribes.

== Saud's sons ==
Muhammad, Abdullah, and Abdul Rahman then formed an alliance. But Saud's sons kept up hostilities against the surviving brothers. Saud's sons used al-Kharj province as their base of operations. Some of them were executed by the Rashidi governor of Riyadh in 1886. Three of them were taken by Muhammad bin Abdullah Al Rashid, Rashidi emir, as hostages and transferred to Hail.

However, the grandsons of Saud were involved in sporadic fighting against their cousins and not formally reconciled for many years. The descendants of Saud, through his grandson Saud Al Kabeer bin Abdulaziz, are still considered the ceremonially senior branch of the family, and known as the Saud Al Kabeer branch.

== Personal life and death ==
Saud married a woman from the Ajman tribe. He had six sons. He died of smallpox in 1875.
