= Ibn Saud =

King of Saudi Arabia from 1932 to 1953

Abdulaziz II
- Emir of Riyadh; Emir of Nejd and Hasa; Sultan of Nejd; King of Hejaz, Nejd and its Dependencies; King of the Kingdom of Saudi Arabia
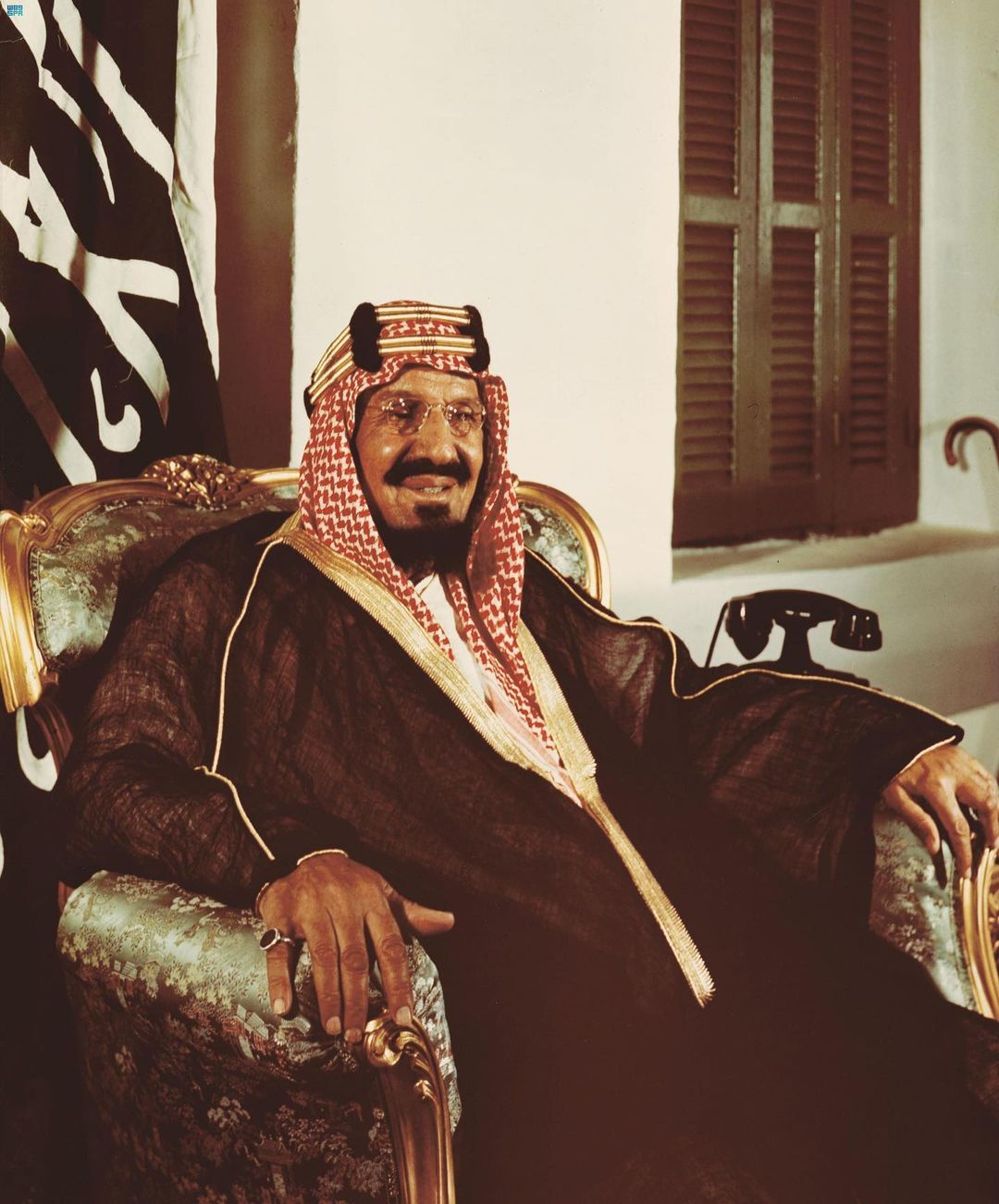
- Official portrait, 1940s

King of Saudi Arabia
- Reign: 23 September 1932 – 9 November 1953
- Bay'ah: 23 September 1932
- Predecessor: Abdulrahman bin Faisal (as Imam of the Emirate of Nejd)
- Successor: Saud bin Abdulaziz

Emir/Sultan/King of Nejd
- Reign: 15 January 1902 – 23 September 1932 (Note: Ibn Saud ruled as Emir of Riyadh (1902 to 1913), Emir of Nejd and Hasa (1913 to 1921), Sultan of Nejd (1921 to 1926), and King of Hejaz and Nejd and Its Dependencies (1926 to 1932). On 23 September 1932, the Kingdom of Saudi Arabia was established.)
- Predecessor: Abdulaziz bin Mutaib (as Emir of the Emirate of Jabal Shammar)
- Successor: Himself (as King of Saudi Arabia)

King of Hejaz
- Reign: 8 January 1926 – 23 September 1932
- Predecessor: Ali bin Hussein
- Successor: Himself (as King of Saudi Arabia)
- Born: 15 January 1876; Riyadh, Emirate of Nejd
- Died: 9 November 1953 (aged 77); Shubra Palace, Taif, Saudi Arabia
- Burial: 9 November 1953; Al Oud cemetery, Riyadh, Saudi Arabia
- Spouses: See list: Mudhi; Bushra; Shahida; Munayyir; Bazza I; Bazza II; Futaymah; Saida Al-Yamaniyah; Baraka Al-Yamaniyah; Hussa Al-Sudairi; Lajah bint Khalid; Tarfa Al-Sheikh; Haya bint Saad; Jawhara Al-Sudairi; Fahda Al-Shammari; Al-Jawhara bint Musaed; Luluwah Al-Dakhil; Wadha Al-Orair; Nouf Al-Shaalan; Mudhi Al-Khalidi
- Issue among others...: See list: Prince Turki I; King Saud; King Faisal; Prince Muhammad; Prince Nasser; King Khalid; Prince Saad; Princess Sara; Prince Mansour; King Fahd; Prince Bandar; Prince Musa'id; King Abdullah; Prince Abdul Muhsin; Prince Mishaal; Princess Qumash; Prince Sultan; Princess Al Bandari; Princess Sultana; Princess Luluwah; Princess Haya; Princess Seeta; Prince Abdul Rahman; Prince Mutaib; Prince Talal; Prince Mishari; Prince Badr; Prince Turki II; Prince Nawwaf; Prince Nayef; Prince Fawwaz; King Salman; Prince Majid; Prince Thamir; Prince Abdul Illah; Princess Madawi; Prince Mamdouh; Prince Sattam; Prince Ahmed; Prince Abdul Majeed; Prince Hathloul; Prince Mashour; Prince Muqrin; Prince Hamoud; Princess Al Jawhara; Princess Latifa; Princess Nouf
Names
- Abdulaziz bin Abdulrahman bin Faisal Al Saud
- House: Al Saud
- Father: Abdulrahman bin Faisal
- Mother: Sara bint Ahmed
- Religion: Sunni Islam
- Occupation: Military leader; Politician; Statesman
- Military career
- Allegiance: Saudi Arabia
- Rank: Commander-in-Chief
- Conflicts: World War I; Unification of Saudi Arabia; World War II; Italian Air Raids on Bahrain and Dhahran; Arab–Israeli conflict; 1948 Arab–Israeli War

Abdulaziz Al Saud (Note: Arabic: عَبْدُ الْعَزِيزِ آلِ سُعُود (romanized: ʿAbd al-ʿAzīz Āl Saʿūd)) (15 January 1876 (Note: Ibn Saud's birth year has been a source of debate. It is generally accepted as 1876, although a few sources give it as 1880. According to British author Robert Lacey's book The Kingdom, a leading Saudi historian found records that show Ibn Saud in 1891 greeting an important tribal delegation. The historian reasoned that a 10 or 11-year-old child (as given by the 1880 birth date) would have been too young to be allowed to greet such a delegation, while an adolescent of 15 or 16 (as given by the 1876 date) would likely have been allowed. When Lacey interviewed one of Ibn Saud's sons prior to writing the book, the son recalled that his father often laughed at records showing his birth date to be 1880. Ibn Saud's response to such records was reportedly that "I swallowed four years of my life." p. 561) – 9 November 1953), commonly known as Ibn Saud and by his kunya, Abu Turki, was the founder of the Third Saudi State and the first King of Saudi Arabia. Beginning with the Reconquest of Riyadh in 1902, he ruled and expanded the state under various titles as its territory grew, until the proclamation of the Kingdom of Saudi Arabia on 23 September 1932, reigning as its king until his death in 1953, His reign was the longest of any Saudi monarch.

Abdulaziz II was the son of Abdulrahman bin Faisal, the last imam of the Second Saudi State (Emirate of Nejd), and Sara Al-Sudairi. Born in 1876, he witnessed the final years of the state before its defeat in 1891 at the Battle of Mulayda by the Emirate of Jabal Shammar, a former nominal vassal of the Saudi state backed by the Ottoman Empire. Following the defeat, the House of Saud went into exile in the Emirate of Kuwait.

In 1902, he returned from Kuwait and launched an attack against the Emirate of Jabal Shammar, capturing Riyadh, the former capital of the Second Saudi State. This marked the beginning of the Unification of Saudi Arabia and the establishment of the Third Saudi State. His military campaigns continued over the following decades, overlapping with the Middle Eastern theatre of World War I, during which he joined the Allied Powers in 1915.

In accordance with Wahhabi beliefs and Islamic revivalist views, he ordered the demolition of several tombs and shrines, at Al-Baqi Cemetery and Jannat al-Mu'alla. He also abolished the four separate prayer groups, each representing one of the four Sunni schools of jurisprudence, at the Sacred Mosque in Mecca in 1926, uniting all worshippers under a single imam.

== Early life and family origins ==
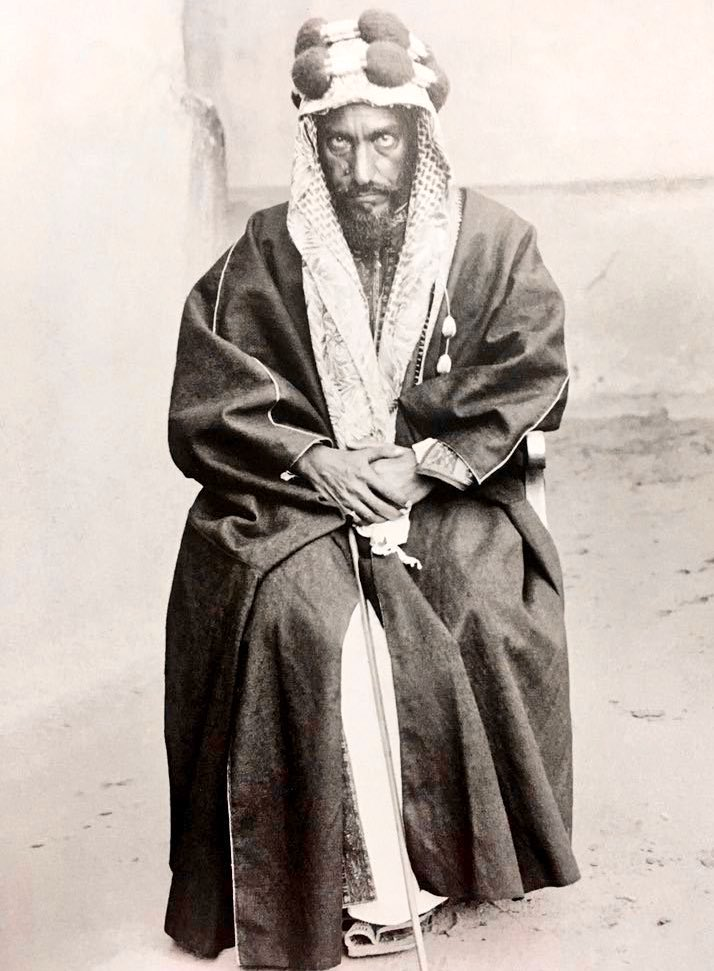
Ibn Saud's father, Abdul Rahman bin Faisal Al Saud, last Emir of Nejd

The Al Saud family had been a power in central Arabia for the previous 130 years. Under the influence and inspiration of Wahhabism, the Saudis had previously attempted to control much of the Arabian Peninsula in the form of the Emirate of Diriyah, the first Saudi state, until its destruction by an Ottoman army in the Ottoman–Wahhabi war in the early nineteenth century.

Abdulaziz bin Abdul Rahman, also known as Ibn Saud, was born on 15 January 1876 in Riyadh. He was the fourth child and third son of Abdul Rahman bin Faisal, one of the last rulers of the Emirate of Nejd, the second Saudi state, a tribal sheikhdom centered on Riyadh. Ibn Saud's mother was Sara bint Ahmed Al Sudairi of the Sudairi family. She died in 1910. His full-siblings were Faisal, Noura, Bazza, Haya and Saad. He also had a number of half-siblings from his father's other marriages, including Muhammad, Abdullah, Ahmed, and Musaid, who all had roles in the Saudi government. Ibn Saud was taught Quran by Abdullah Al Kharji in Riyadh.

== Exile and recapture of Riyadh ==
In 1891, the House of Saud's long-term regional rivals led by Muhammad bin Abdullah Al Rashid conquered Riyadh. Ibn Saud was 15 at the time. He and his family initially took refuge with the Al Murrah, a Bedouin tribe in the southern desert of Arabia. Later, the Al Sauds moved to Qatar and stayed there for two months. Their next stop was Bahrain where they stayed briefly. The Ottoman State allowed them to settle in Kuwait where they settled and lived for nearly a decade. Ibn Saud developed a rapport with the Kuwaiti ruler Mubarak Al Sabah and frequently visited his majlis. His father, Abdul Rahman, did not endorse these visits, perceiving Mubarak's lifestyle as immoral and unorthodox.

On 14 November 1901 Ibn Saud and some relatives, including his half-brother Muhammad and several cousins (amongst them Abdullah bin Jiluwi), set out on a raiding expedition into the Nejd, targeting mainly tribes associated with the Rashidis. On 12 December they reached Al Ahsa and then proceeded south towards the Empty Quarter with the support from various tribes. Upon this Abdulaziz Al Rashid sent messages to Qatari ruler Jassim bin Mohammed Al Thani and to the Ottoman governor of Baghdad asking their help to stop Ibn Saud's raids on the tribes loyal to Al Rashid. These events led to a decrease in the number of Ibn Saud's raiders, and his father also asked him to cancel his plans to capture Riyadh. However, Ibn Saud did not cancel the raid and managed to reach Riyadh. On the night of 15 January 1902, he led 40 men over the city walls on tilted palm trees and took the city. The Rashidi governor of the city, Ajlan, was killed by Abdullah bin Jiluwi in front of his own fortress. The Saudi recapture of the city marked the beginning of the third Saudi State.

Following Ibn Saud's victory the Kuwaiti ruler Mubarak Al Sabah sent him an additional seventy warriors commanded by Ibn Saud's younger brother Saad. Upon settling in Riyadh, Ibn Saud took up residence in the palace of his grandfather, Faisal bin Turki.

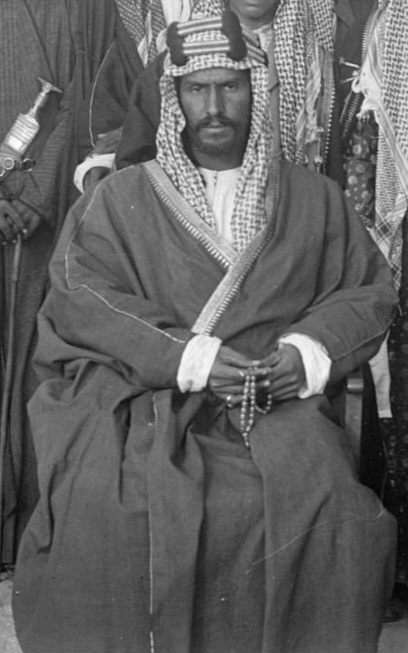
Ibn Saud in the Emirate of Kuwait in 1910, at the age of 34

== Rise to power ==
Territorial evolution of the Third Saudi State (1902–1932)

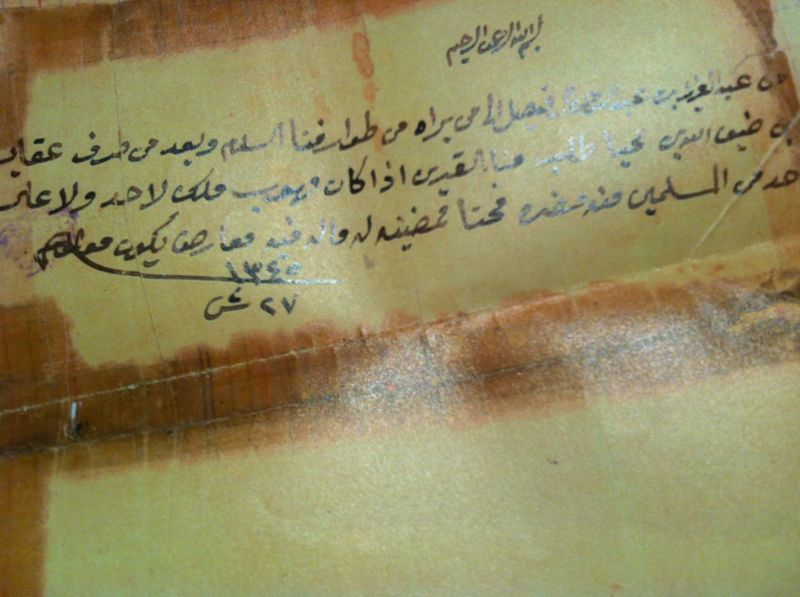
Ibn Saud's signature in a document to Eqab bin Muhaya of Otaibah

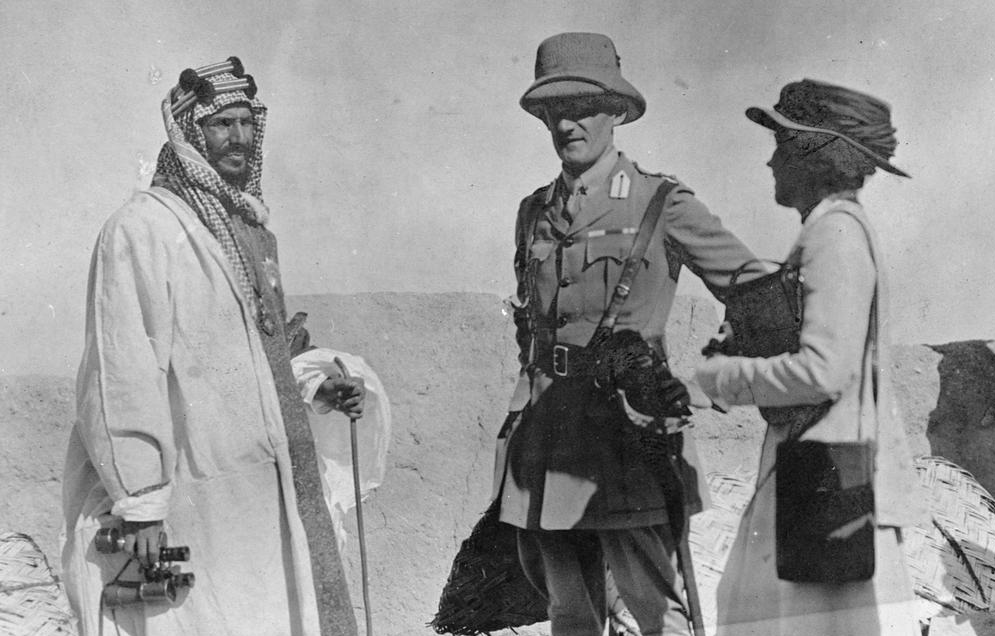
Ibn Saud with Percy Cox and Gertrude Bell during the Arab Revolt, Basrah, 1916

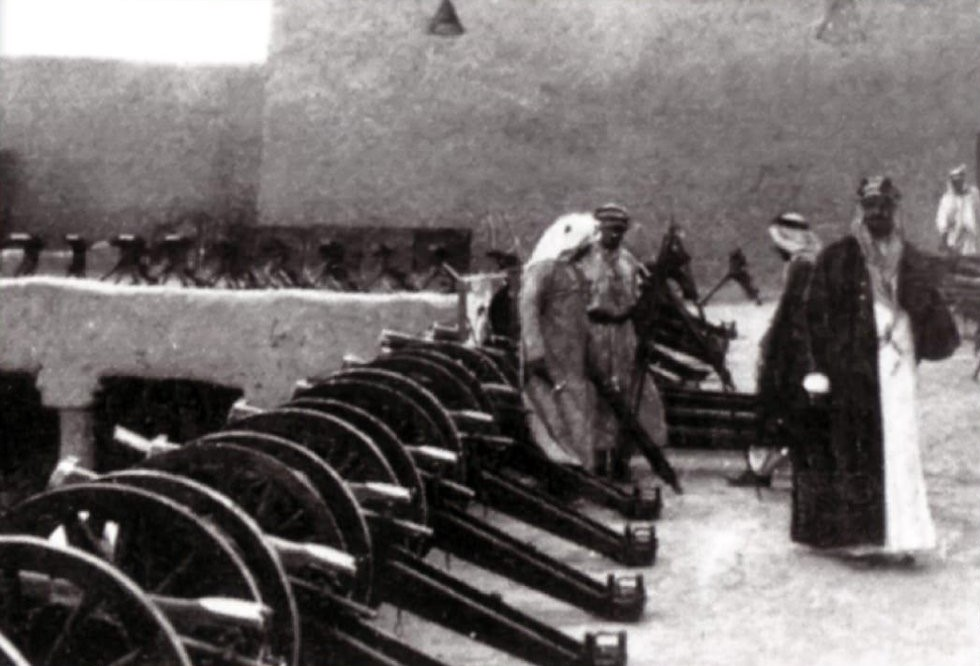
Ibn Saud alongside captured weapons from the Rashidi Emirate after its surrender during the Ha'il campaign of 1921

Following the capture of Riyadh, many former supporters of the House of Saud rallied to Ibn Saud's call to arms. He was a charismatic leader and kept his men supplied with arms. Over the next two years, he and his forces recaptured almost half of the Nejd from the Rashidis.

In 1904, Abdulaziz bin Mutaib Al Rashid appealed to the Ottoman Empire for military protection and assistance. The Ottomans responded by sending troops into Arabia. On 15 June 1904, Ibn Saud's forces suffered a major defeat at the hands of the combined Ottoman and Rashidi forces. His forces regrouped and began to wage a guerrilla war against the Ottomans. Over the next two years, he was able to disrupt their supply routes, forcing them to retreat. Their efforts were rewarded in February 1905, when the Ottomans reversed their alliances and named Ibn Saud as qaimmaqam of southern Nejd, a title he held until the 1913 Anglo-Ottoman agreement. Ibn Saud's victory in Rawdat Muhanna, in which Abdulaziz Al Rashid died, ended the Ottoman presence in Nejd and Qassim by the end of October 1906. This victory also weakened Ibn Saud's alliance with the Kuwaiti ruler Mubarak Al Sabah, who began to fear Saudi preeminence in the region.

Ibn Saud completed his conquest of the Nejd and the eastern coast of Arabia in 1912. He then founded the Ikhwan, a military-religious brotherhood, which was to assist in his later conquests, with the approval of local Salafi ulema. In the same year, he instituted an agrarian policy to settle the nomadic pastoralist bedouins into colonies and to replace their tribal organizations with allegiance to the Ikhwan.

Ibn Saud offered his alliance to the British but was rebuffed, and in May 1914 he made a secret agreement with the Ottomans which would have made Ibn Saud the wali (governor) of Najd. With the outbreak of World War I, this agreement did not materialize, and the British government resumed diplomatic relations with him. The British agent, Captain William Shakespear, was well received by the Bedouin. Britain sought similar diplomatic with other Arabian powers seeking to unify and stabilize the region. The Treaty of Darin in December 1915 made the lands of the House of Saud a British protectorate and attempted to define the boundaries of the developing Saudi state. In exchange, Ibn Saud pledged to again make war against Ibn Rashid, who was an ally of the Ottomans.

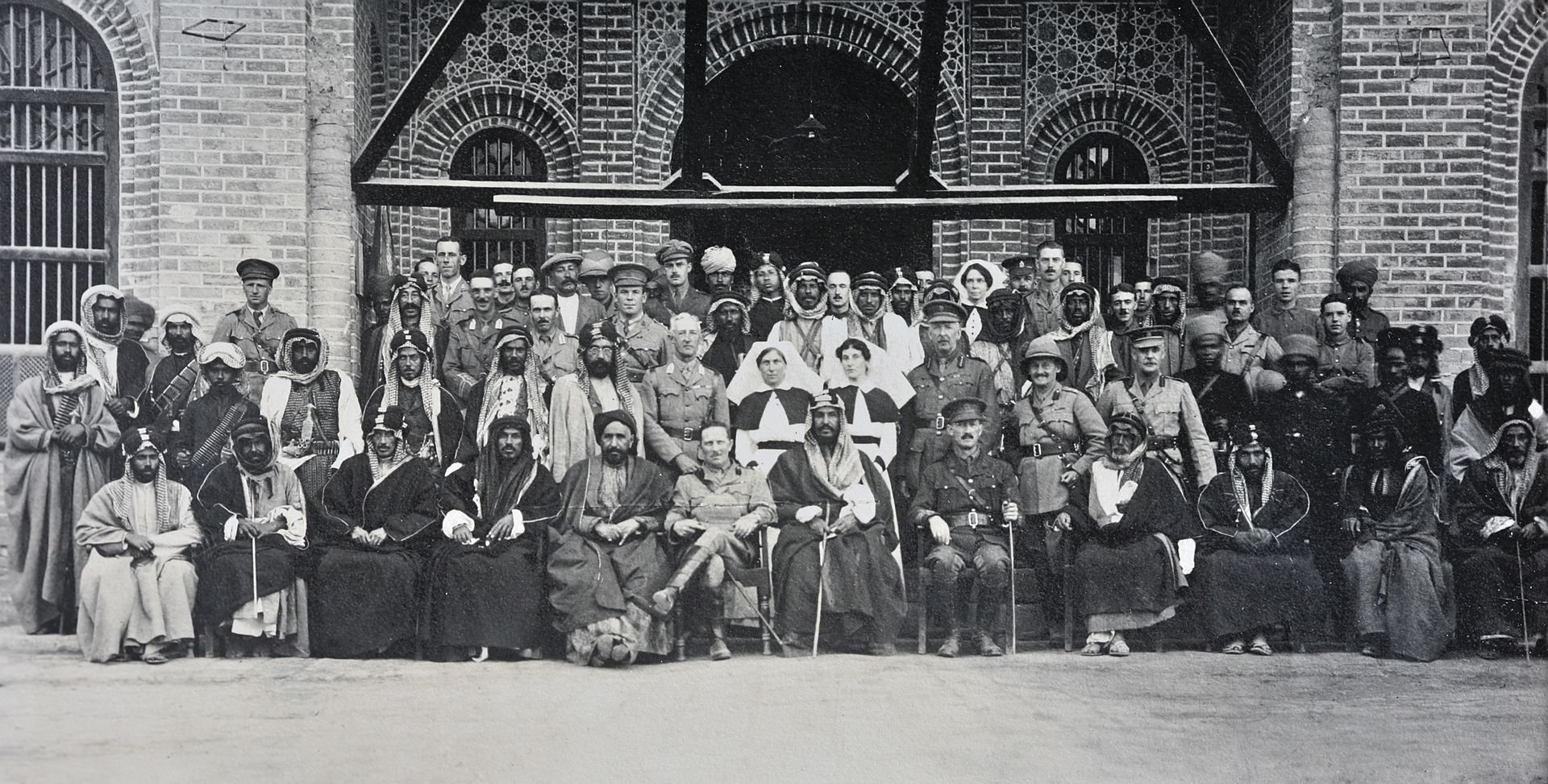
Ibn Saud as a guest of Shaikh Khaz'al in Mohammerah. The image includes Sheikh Khaz'al, Emir of Arabistan, Ibn Saud, Sir Percy Cox, along with Saudi Arabia dignitaries and other British officials

During this period, Ibn Saud also sought to strengthen his position through regional alliances. Sheikh Khaz'al Emir of Arabistan advised the Ottoman authorities that Ibn Saud was more valuable to them than Al-Ahsa and Qatif, urging them to support him as a strategic asset. As part of his diplomatic engagements, Ibn Saud traveled to Mohammerah as a guest of Sheikh Khaz'al. The two leaders arrived in Basra on the evening of November 26. The next morning, the British senior political officer, accompanied by two high-ranking British military representatives of the stationed army commander in Basra, boarded Sheikh Khaz’al's ship and presented Ibn Saud with the Sword of Honour along with a welcome letter from the army commander. He spent the day inspecting the British military base camps, their organization, and the latest military equipment, including warplanes, which he showed great interest in.

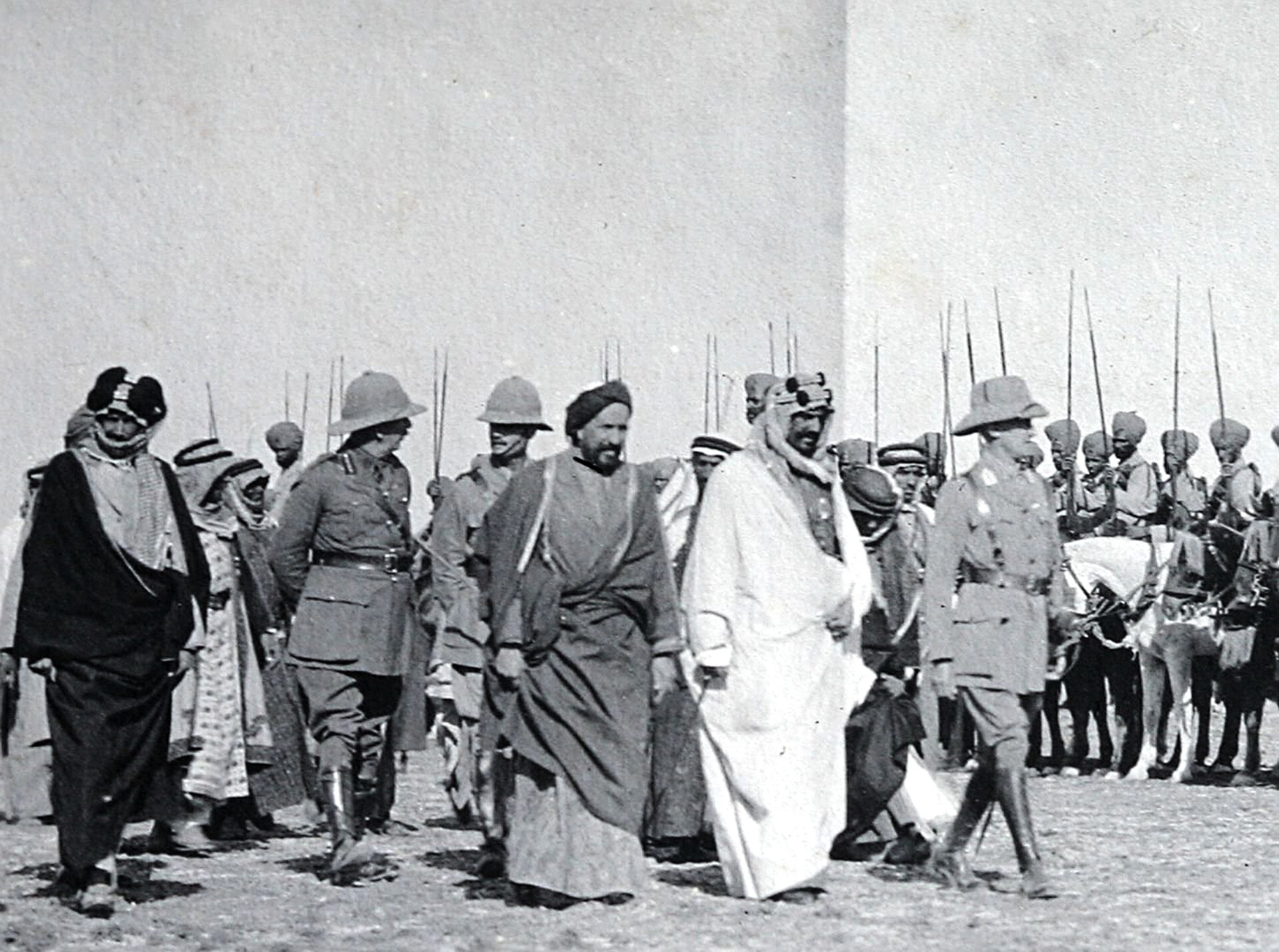
Sheikh Khaz'al, Ibn Saud, and Sir Percy Cox visiting the British army in Basra, during the Arab revolt, 1916

The British Foreign Office had previously begun to support Hussein bin Ali, Sharif of Mecca and Emir of the Hejaz, by sending T. E. Lawrence to him in 1915. The Saudi Ikhwan began to conflict with Hussein in 1917, just as his sons Abdullah and Faisal entered Damascus. The Treaty of Darin remained in effect until superseded by the Jeddah conference of 1927 and the Dammam conference of 1952, during both of which Ibn Saud extended his boundaries past the Anglo-Ottoman Blue Line. After Darin, he stockpiled the weapons and supplies which the British provided him, including a 'tribute' of £5,000 per month. After World War I Ibn Saud received further support from the British, including a glut of surplus munitions. He launched his campaign against the Al Rashidi in 1920; by 1922 they had been all but destroyed.

The defeat of the Al Rashidi doubled the size of Saudi territory because, after the war of Ha'il, Ibn Saud sent his army to occupy Al Jouf and the army led by Eqab bin Mohaya, the head of the Talhah branch of the Otaibah tribe. This allowed Ibn Saud the leverage to negotiate a new and more favorable treaty with the British in 1922, signed at Uqair. He met Percy Cox, British High Commissioner in Iraq, to draw boundaries and the treaty saw Britain recognize many of Ibn Saud's territorial gains. In exchange, Ibn Saud agreed to recognize British territories in the area, particularly along the Persian Gulf coast and in Iraq. The former of these were vital to the British, as merchant traffic between British India and the United Kingdom depended upon coaling stations on the approach to the Suez Canal.

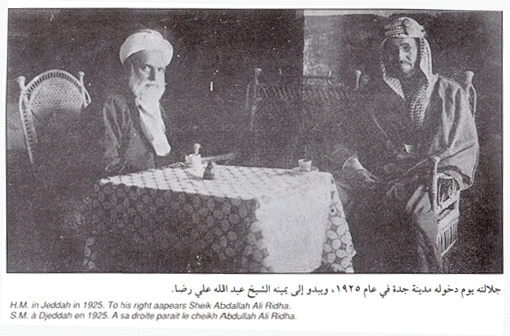
Ibn Saud sitting with Abdullah Ali Reda on the day he entered Jeddah in 1925

In 1925, Ibn Saud's forces captured the holy city of Mecca from Sharif Hussein, ending 700 years of Hashemite rule. Following this he issued the first decree which was about the collection of zakat. On 8 January 1926, the leading figures in Mecca, Medina and Jeddah proclaimed Ibn Saud the King of Hejaz and the bayaa (oath of allegiance) ceremony was held in the Great Mosque of Mecca.

Ibn Saud raised Nejd to a kingdom as well on 29 January 1927. On 20 May 1927, the British government signed the Treaty of Jeddah, which abolished the Darin protection agreement and recognized the independence of the Hejaz and Nejd, with Ibn Saud as their ruler. For the next five years, Ibn Saud administered the two parts of his dual kingdom as separate units. He also succeeded his father, Abdul Rahman, as Imam.

Letter of Ibn Saud to Shaikh Khaz'al the Emir of Arabistan in 1923

With international recognition and support, Ibn Saud continued to consolidate his power. By 1927, his forces had overrun most of the central Arabian Peninsula, but the alliance between the Ikhwan and the Al Saud collapsed when Ibn Saud forbade further raiding. The few portions of central Arabia that had not been overrun by the Saudi-Ikhwan forces had treaties with London, and Ibn Saud was sober enough to see the folly of provoking the British by pushing into these areas. This did not sit well with the Ikhwan, who had been taught that all non-Wahhabis were infidels. In order to settle down the problems with the Ikhwan leaders, including Faisal Al Duwaish, Sultan bin Bajad and Dhaydan bin Hithlain, Ibn Saud organized a meeting in Riyadh in 1928, but none of them attended the meeting. Tensions finally boiled over when the Ikhwan rebelled. After two years of fighting, they were suppressed by Ibn Saud in the Battle of Sabilla in March 1929.

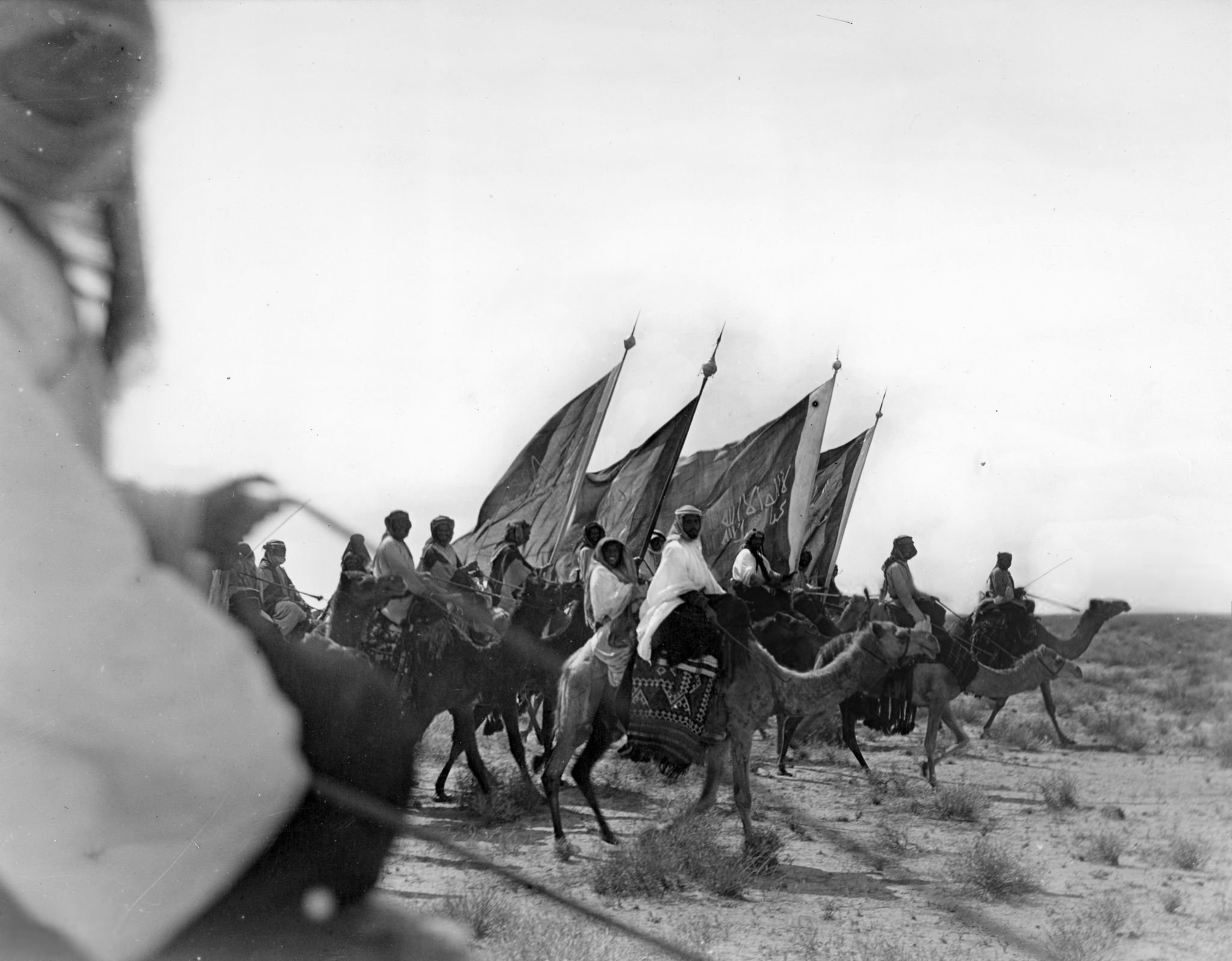
The Ikhwan army during their revolt against the alliance of the British Empire, Kuwait and Ibn Saud

On 23 September 1932, Ibn Saud formally united his realm into the Kingdom of Saudi Arabia, with himself as its king. He transferred his court to Murabba Palace from the Masmak Fort in 1938 and the palace remained his residence and the seat of government until his death in 1953.

Ibn Saud had to first eliminate the right of his own father in order to rule, and then distance and contain the ambitions of his five brothers, particularly his brother Muhammad, who had fought with him during the battles and conquests that gave birth to the state.

== Oil discovery and his rule ==
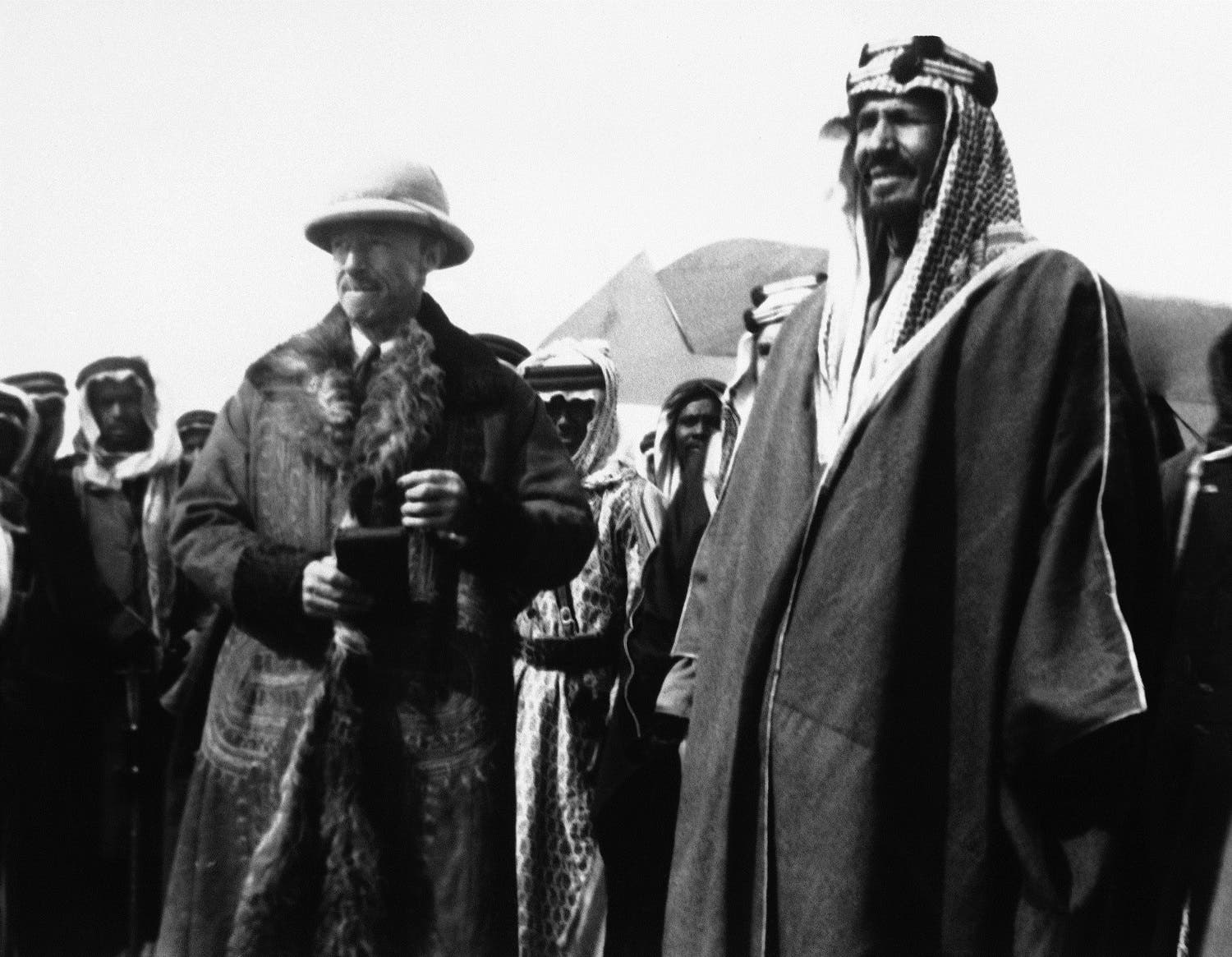
Ibn Saud with a foreigner in the 1930s

Petroleum was discovered in Saudi Arabia in 1938 by Chevron Corporation, after Ibn Saud granted a concession in 1933. Through his advisers St John Philby and Ameen Rihani, Ibn Saud granted substantial authority over Saudi oil fields to American oil companies in 1944. Beginning in 1915, he signed a "friendship and cooperation" pact with Britain to keep his militia in line and cease any further attacks against their protectorates for whom they were responsible.

Ibn Saud's newly found oil wealth brought a great deal of power and influence that he would use to his advantage in the Hejaz. He forced many nomadic tribes to settle down and abandon "petty wars" and vendettas. He began widespread enforcement of the new kingdom's ideology, based on the teachings of Muhammad Ibn Abd al-Wahhab. This included an end to traditionally sanctioned rites of pilgrimage, recognized by the orthodox schools of jurisprudence, but at odds with those sanctioned by al-Wahhab. In 1926, after a caravan of Egyptian pilgrims on the way to Mecca were beaten by his forces for playing bugles, he was impelled to issue a conciliatory statement to the Egyptian government. In fact, several such statements were issued to Muslim governments around the world as a result of beatings suffered by the pilgrims visiting the holy cities of Mecca and Medina. With the uprising and subsequent suppression thereafter of the Ikhwan in 1929, the 1930s marked a turning point. With his rivals eliminated, Ibn Saud's ideology was in full force, ending nearly 1,400 years of accepted religious practices surrounding the Hajj, the majority of which were sanctioned by a millennium of scholarship.

Ibn Saud established a Shura Council of the Hejaz as early as 1927. This council was later expanded to 20 members and was chaired by Ibn Saud's son, Prince Faisal.

== Foreign wars ==
Following the unification of the Kingdom of Saudi Arabia, Ibn Saud focused on securing his frontiers against neighboring Arab states and British mandate territories. His primary military engagement during this era was the Saudi-Yemeni War of 1934, sparked by long-standing territorial disputes over the border regions of Asir, Jazan, and Najran.

The conflict was brief but decisive. Saudi forces advanced rapidly along the Tihama coastal plain and into the mountainous interior of Yemen. The war concluded the same year with the signing of the Treaty of Taif. Under this agreement, Yemen recognized Saudi sovereignty over Asir, Jazan, and Najran, while Ibn Saud withdrew his forces from newly occupied Yemeni territories like Hudaydah, establishing a border framework that lasted for decades.

Beyond direct warfare, Ibn Saud’s regional foreign policy relied on stabilizing the northern frontier. While early cross-border raids by the Ikhwan into the British mandates of Transjordan and Iraq caused severe diplomatic tension, Ibn Saud spent the late 1920s and 1930s suppressing these unauthorized incursions, eventually signing frontier agreements, such as the Treaty of Hadda, to cement peaceful relations with his Hashemite neighbors under British arbitration.

== Charity works ==
Ibn Saud's charity earned him respect among his people. The King would direct money to be handed to the impoverished whenever he saw them. This is why the poor would eagerly anticipate his appearance in villages, towns, and even the desert.

"O Abdul-Aziz, may Allah give you in the Hereafter as He has given you in the world!" an elderly woman once said to Ibn Saud's procession. The King ordered that she be given ten bags of money from his car. Ibn Saud noticed the old woman having trouble bringing the money back to her home, so he had his aid service deliver the money and accompany her back to her home. Ibn Saud was on a picnic outside of Riyadh when he came across an elderly man dressed in rags. The old man proceeded to stand up in front of the King's horse and said, "O Abdul-Aziz, it is terribly cold, and I have no clothes to protect me". Ibn Saud, saddened by the man's condition, removed his cloak and gave it to him. He also offered the elderly man a stipend to help him with his everyday costs.

Due to the abundance of the poor, Ibn Saud established a guest house known as the "Thulaim" or "The Host", where rice, meat, and several types of porridge were distributed to the poor. As the economy deteriorated, Ibn Saud began to increase his aid to the needy. He gave them "royal kits" of bread and "waayid", which were monetary gifts given to them on an annual basis. The King said, "I haven't obtained all this wealth by myself. It is a blessing from Allah, and all of you have a share in it. So, I want you to guide me to whatever takes me nearer to my Lord and qualifies me for His forgiveness."

== Later years ==
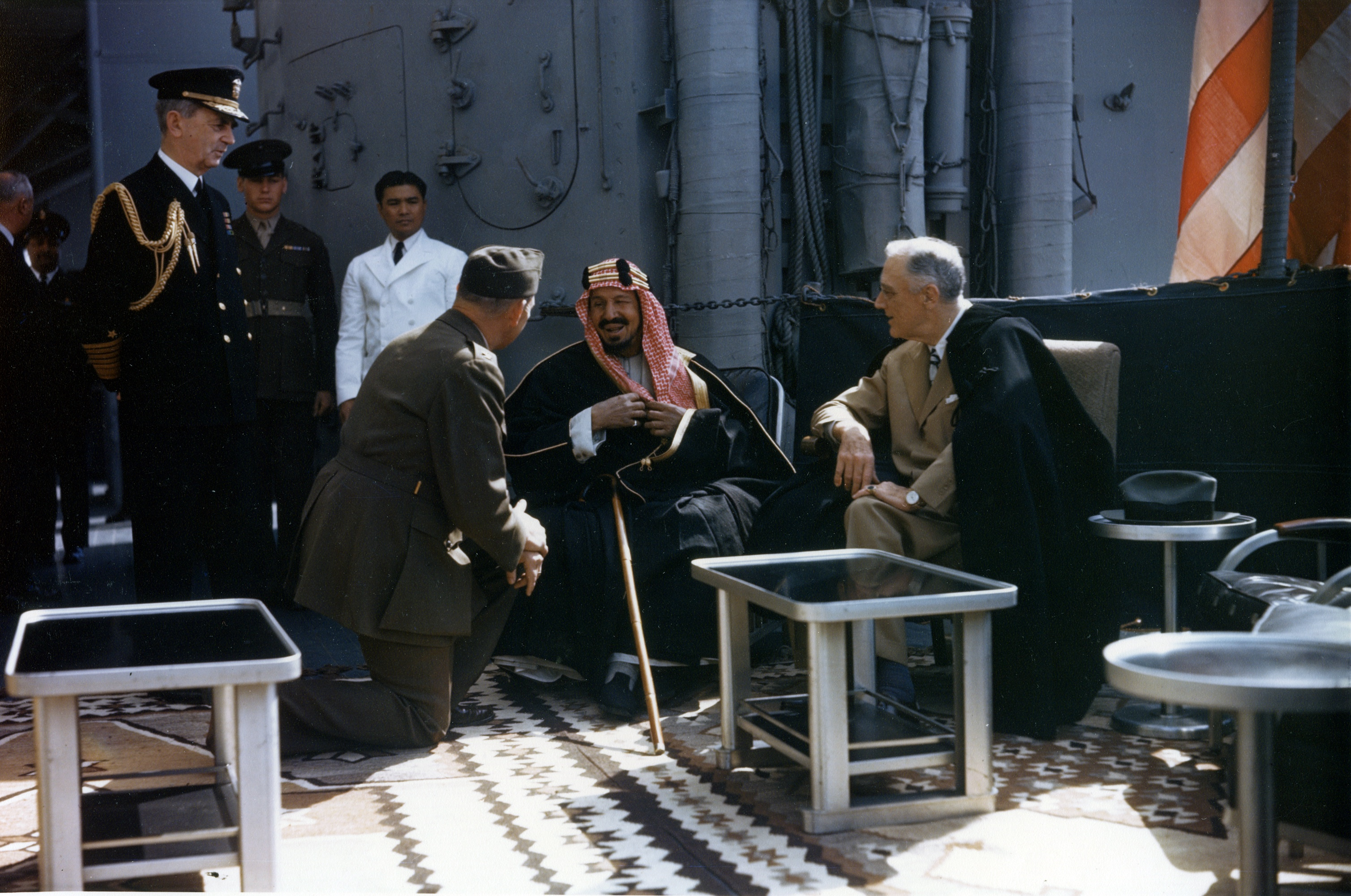
Ibn Saud converses with U.S. president Franklin D. Roosevelt (right) in 1945 through interpreter William A. Eddy, on board the USS Quincy, after the Yalta Conference. Fleet Admiral William D. Leahy (left) watches.

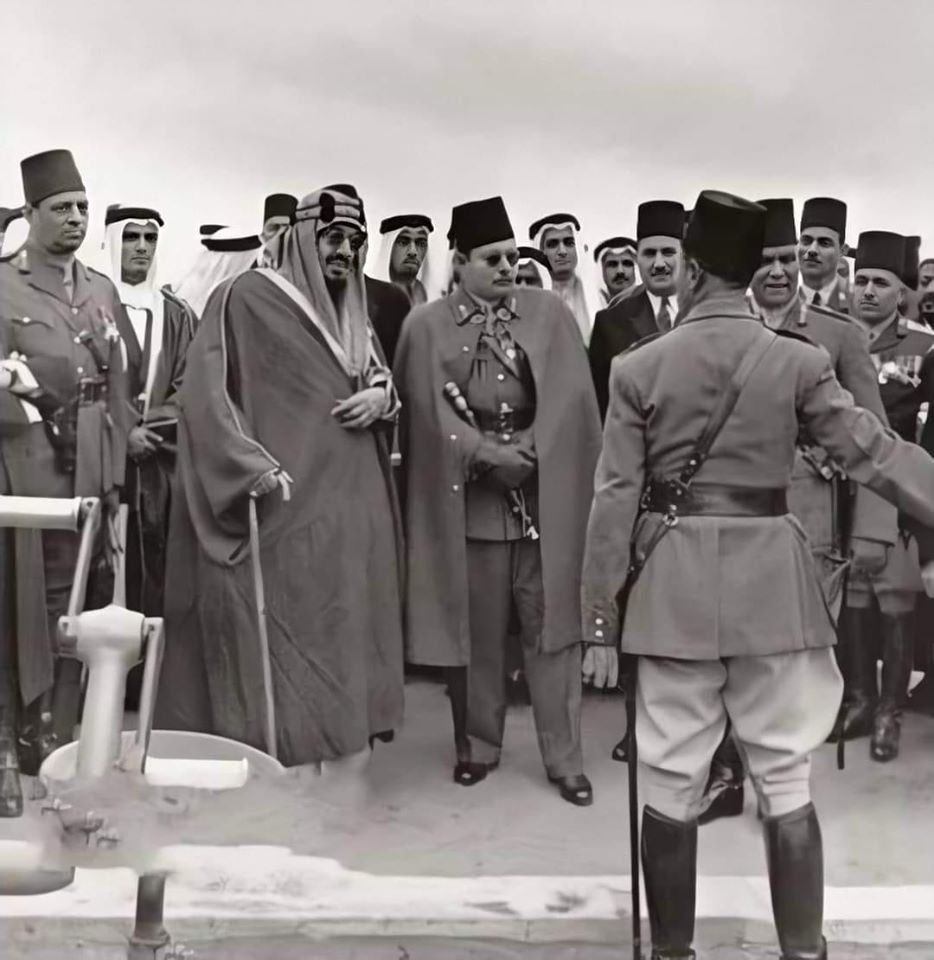
King Farouk of Egypt and Sudan alongside Ibn Saud checking an Egyptian Army unit in 1946.

Ibn Saud positioned Saudi Arabia as neutral in World War II, but was generally considered to favor the Allies. However, in 1938, when an attack on a main British pipeline in the Kingdom of Iraq was found to be connected to the German Ambassador, Fritz Grobba, Ibn Saud provided Grobba with refuge. It was reported that he had been disfavoring the British as of 1937.

In the last stage of the war, Ibn Saud met significant political figures. One of these meetings, which lasted for three days, was with U.S. president Franklin D. Roosevelt on 14 February 1945. The meeting took place on board USS Quincy in the Great Bitter Lake segment of the Suez Canal. The meeting laid down the basis of the future relations between the two countries. The other meeting was with British prime minister Winston Churchill in the Grand Hotel du Lac on the shores of the Fayyoun Oasis, fifty miles south of Cairo, in February 1945. Saudis report that the meeting heavily focused on the Palestine problem and was unproductive in terms of its outcomes, in contrast to that with Roosevelt.

After naming his son Saud as Crown Prince of Saudi Arabia, the King left most of his duties to him, and he spent most of his time in Taif. His first flight was between Afif and Taif in September 1945. Ibn Saud met with King Farouk of Egypt during his ten-day state visit to Egypt from 10 to 22 January 1946. Ibn Saud's first official visit to the Saudi Arabia's oil fields occurred between 21 and 29 January 1947 which was organized by the Arabian American Oil Company.

Ibn Saud participated in the 1948 Arab–Israeli War, but Saudi Arabia's contribution was generally considered token. The Saudis deployed 800 to 1,200 troops against Israel, including volunteers, who were attached to the Egyptians. He actively attempted to resolve the dispute between the Kingdom of Egypt and the United Kingdom in the early 1952 and developed a proposal for a settlement between two countries.

While most of the royal family desired luxuries such as gardens, splendid cars, and palaces, Ibn Saud wanted a royal railway from the Persian Gulf to Riyadh and then an extension to Jeddah. His advisors regarded this as an old man's folly. Eventually, ARAMCO built the railway, at a cost of $70 million, drawn from the King's oil royalties. It was completed in 1951 and was used commercially after the King's death. It enabled Riyadh to grow into a relatively modern city. But when a paved road was built in 1962, the railway lost its traffic.

== Personal life ==
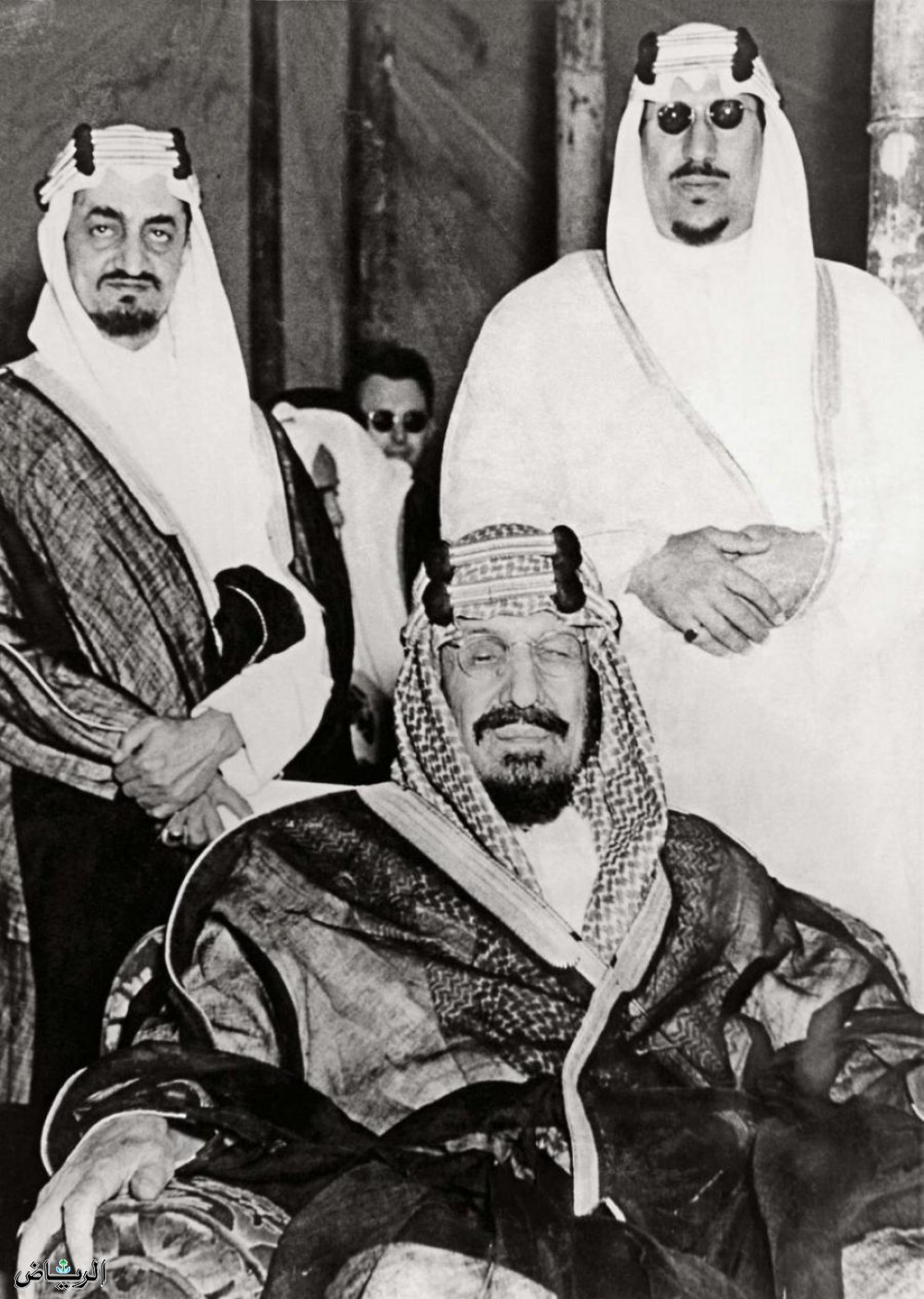
Ibn Saud (seated) with his sons Prince Faisal (left) and Prince Saud in the early 1950s

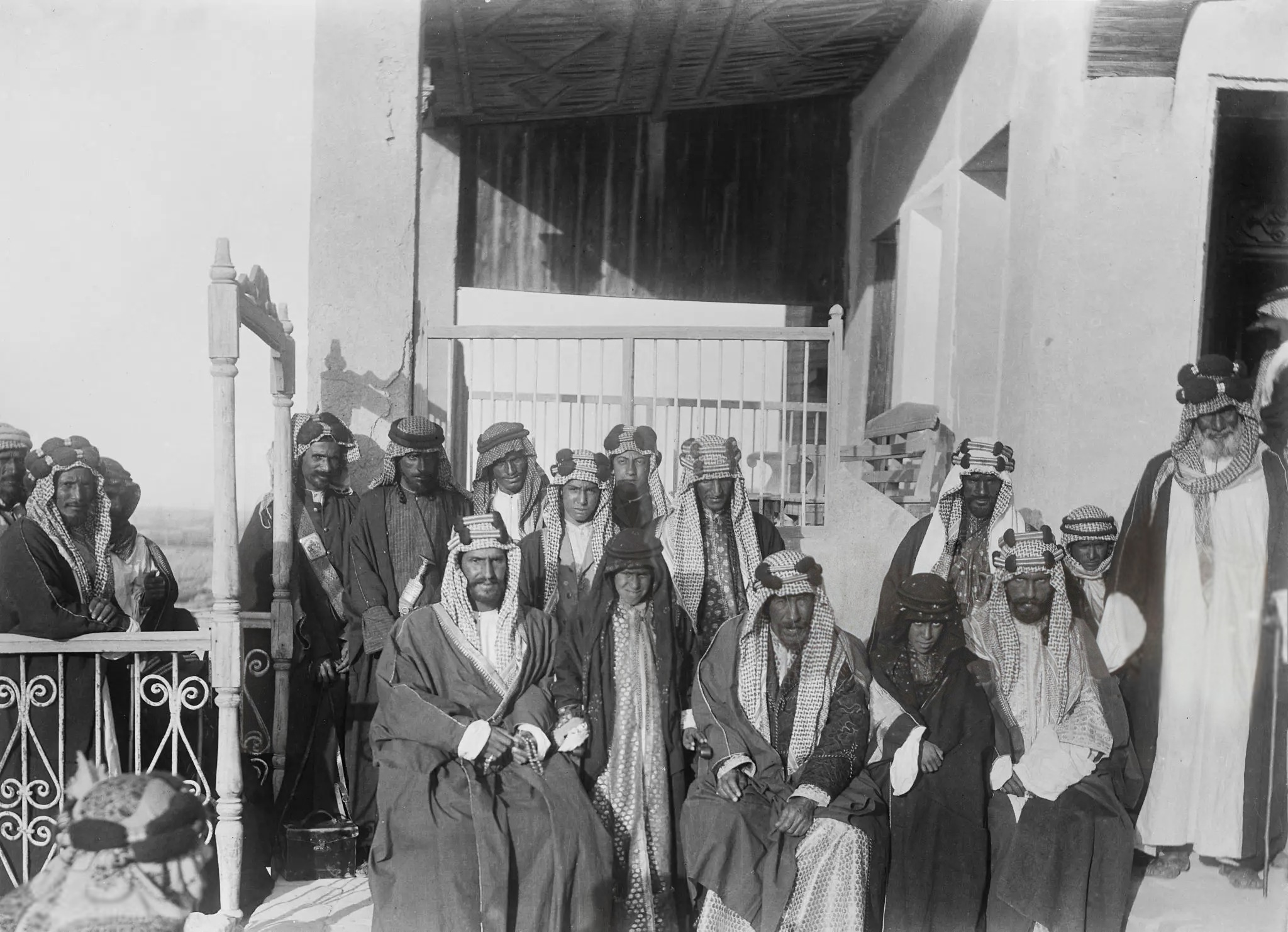
Ibn Saud (seated left) with his brother-in-law Mubarak Al Sabah in Kuwait, 1910

Ibn Saud was very tall for a Saudi man of his time, his height reported as between 1.85m (6 ft 1 in) and 1.88m (6 ft 2 in). He was known to have a charming and charismatic personality that earned him respect among his people and some foreign diplomats. His family and others described Ibn Saud as an affectionate and caring man.

Ibn Saud had twenty-two consorts. Many of his marriages were arranged to form alliances with other clans during the establishment and early years of the Saudi state. As well as his legal wives, he kept concubines in his harem, who by definition were slaves (slavery in Saudi Arabia being legal), these included Baraka Al Yamaniyah. He was the father of almost one hundred children, including 45 sons. Muhammad Leopold Weiss reported in 1929 that one of Ibn Saud's spouses had poisoned the King in 1924, causing him to have poor sight in one eye. He later forgave her, but divorced her. His favorite consorts were Al Jawhara, Hussa, Munaiyir (mother of Prince Talal), Shahida (mother of Mansour bin Abdulaziz Al Saud and Mishaal bin Abdulaziz Al Saud).

One of the significant publications about Ibn Saud in the Western media was a comprehensive article by Noel Busch published in Life magazine in May 1943 which introduced him as a legendary monarch.

Ibn Saud had a kennel for salukis, a dog breed originated in the Middle East. He gave two of his salukis, a male and a mate, to British Field Marshal Sir Henry Maitland Wilson who brought them to Washington, D.C., USA. The male, named Ch Abdul Farouk, won a championship in the USA.

=== Relations with family members ===
Ibn Saud was said to be very close to his paternal aunt, Jawhara bint Faisal. From a young age, she ingrained in him a strong sense of family destiny and motivated him to regain the lost glory of the House of Saud. During the years when the Al Saud family were living almost as refugees in Kuwait, Jawhara bint Faisal frequently recounted the deeds of his ancestors to Ibn Saud and exhorted him not to be content with the existing situation. She was instrumental in making him decide to return to Nejd from Kuwait and regain the territories of his family. She was well educated in Islam, in Arab custom and in tribal and clan relationships. She remained among the King's most trusted and influential advisors all her life. Ibn Saud asked her about the experiences of past rulers and the historical allegiance and the roles of tribes and individuals. Jawhara was also deeply respected by the King's children. The King visited her daily until she died around 1930.

Ibn Saud was also very close to his sister Noura, who was one year older. On several occasions, he identified himself in public with the words: "I am the brother of Noura." Noura died a few years before her brother, and the King was deeply saddened by her death.

=== Assassination attempts ===
On 15 March 1935, three armed men from Oman attacked and tried to assassinate Ibn Saud during his performance of Hajj. He survived the attack unhurt through the intervention of the crown prince, and the three attackers were killed by bodyguards.

Another assassination attempt occurred in 1951, when Captain Abdullah Al Mandili, a member of Royal Saudi Air Force, tried to bomb the King's camp from an airplane. The attempt was unsuccessful, and Al Mandili escaped to Iraq with the help of tribes.

=== Successor ===
Ibn Saud's eldest son Turki, who was the crown prince of the Kingdoms of Nejd and Hejaz, died at age 18, predeceasing his father. Had Turki not died, he would have been the crown prince. Instead, Ibn Saud appointed his second son, Prince Saud, heir to the Saudi throne in 1933. He had many quarrels with his brother Muhammad bin Abdul Rahman as to who should be appointed heir. Muhammad wanted his son Khalid to be designated the heir.

When the King discussed succession before his death, he favoured Prince Faisal as a possible successor over Crown Prince Saud due to Faisal's extensive knowledge, as well as his years of experience. Since Faisal was a child, Ibn Saud recognised him as the most capable of his sons and often tasked him with responsibilities in war and diplomacy. In addition, Faisal was known to embrace a simple Bedouin lifestyle. "I only wish I had three Faisals", Ibn Saud once said when discussing who would succeed him. However, he made the decision to keep Prince Saud as crown prince for fear that doing otherwise would lead to decreased stability.

== Views ==
Ibn Saud said, "Two things are essential to our state and our people ... religion and the rights inherited from our fathers." He also remarked, "We know what to avoid, and we know what to accept for our own benefit."

Amani Hamdan argues that the King's attitude towards women's education was encouraging since he expressed his support in a conversation with St John Philby in which he stated, "It is permissible for women to read."

Ibn Saud kept servants, and regulated slavery in his kingdom in 1936. It was only his son, King Faisal, who abolished slavery in Saudi Arabia in 1967.

Ibn Saud repeated the following views about the British authorities many times: "The English are my friends, but I will walk with them only so far as my religion and honor will allow." He had much more positive views about the United States, including finance, and in 1947 when the World Bank was suggested to him as the source of development loans instead of the US Export-Import Bank, Ibn Saud reported that Saudi Arabia would do business with and be indebted to the United States instead of other countries and international agencies.

Shortly before his death, the King stated, "Verily, my children and my possessions are my enemies." and "In my youth and manhood, I made a nation. Now, in my declining years, I make men for it." His last words to his two sons, the future King Saud and the next in line Prince Faisal, who were already battling each other, were "You are brothers, unite!"

A staunch opponent of Zionism, Ibn Saud had a highly ambivalent opinion of the Jews. On the one hand he often expressed his dislike for the Jews by referring to the Quran and the Hadith. In 1937 he called them "a race accursed by God" who are "destined to final destruction and eternal damnation". For him they were "enemies of Islam and prophet Muhammad" and "enemies of the Muslims until the end of the world." In some instances he made use of antisemitic tropes, calling the Jews a "dangerous and hostile race" with an "exaggerated love of money", accusing them of "making trouble wherever they exist" or igniting conflicts between Muslims and Christians.

On the other hand, he thought of the Jews, at least those who were not Zionists, as "[g]ood friends of the Arabs", opposed declaring an anti-Jewish jihad and fiercely condemned the anti-Jewish 1929 Hebron massacre, which he considered a clear violation of Islamic principles. According to a Najrani Jew David Shuker now living in Israel, the King also had an associate, Yosef ben Aavetz, a Jew and the Jews of Najran were treated well.

== Death and funeral ==
Ibn Saud experienced heart disease in his final years and also, was half blind and racked by arthritis. In October 1953, his illness became serious. Before Ibn Saud slept on the night of 8 November, he recited the shahada several times, which were his last words. He died in his sleep of a heart attack in Shubra Palace in Ta'if on 9 November 1953 at the age of 77, and Prince Faisal was at his side.

The funeral prayer was performed at Al Hawiyah in Ta'if. Ibn Saud's body was brought to Riyadh where he was buried in Al Oud cemetery next to his sister Noura.

U.S. president Dwight D. Eisenhower issued a message on Ibn Saud's death on 11 November 1953. U.S. Secretary of State John Foster Dulles stated after the King's death that he would be remembered for his achievements as a statesman.

== Names, styles, honours, flags ==
=== Names and styles ===
Styles of Ibn Saud
- Reference style: His Majesty
- Spoken style: Your Majesty
- Alternative style: Abu Turki

King Abdulaziz was known by several names and styles. He was commonly known by the kunya Abu Turki (Arabic: أَبُو تُرْكِي), meaning "father of Turki", in reference to his eldest son, Turki I bin Abdulaziz Al Saud. He favored "Abu Turki" over more formal styles such as "His Highness the Sultan" and "His Majesty the King". He was also known as "Ibn Saud", meaning "son of Saud". Abdulaziz also expressed pride in his sister, Noura bint Abdul Rahman Al Saud, and was known to say, "I am the brother of Nourah".

=== Honors ===
- France: The Grand Cross of the Legion of Honor
- Iraq:
  - The Order of the Hashemites
  - The Grand Cross of the Order of the Two Rivers
- Italy:
  - The Grand Cross of the Order of Saints Maurice and Lazarus
  - The Grand Cross of the Order of the Crown of Italy
- Netherlands: The Grand Cross of the Order of the Dutch Lion (18 September 1936)
- Francoist Spain: Grand Cross with White Decoration of the Cross of Military Merit (22 April 1952)
- United Kingdom:
  - The Most Honorable Order of the Bath (GCB, 1 January 1935)
  - Knight Grand Commander of the Most Eminent Order of the Indian Empire (GCIE, 1 January 1920)
  - Order of the Star of India (GCSI)
  - Order of the Star of India (KCSI, 23 November 1916)
  - Knight Commander of the Most Excellent Order of the British Empire (KBE, 23 November 1916)
- United States: Chief Commander of the Legion of Merit (18 February 1947)

=== Flags and banners ===
Royal Standard of Saudi Arabia during the reign of King Abdulaziz (1938–1953)

Royal Banner of Saudi Arabia during the reign of King Abdulaziz and after (1938–1973)

== See also ==
- Descendants of King Abdulaziz
- List of things named after King Abdulaziz
- King of the Sands (2012 film) – a biopic film on King Abdulaziz directed by Najdat Anzour

== Notes ==
Ibn Saud House of Saud Born: 1877 Died: 1953
Regnal titles
Preceded by Abdulaziz bin Mutaib Al Rashid	Amir of Najd and leader of its Tribes; 1902-1921	Succeeded by Himself as Sultan of Najd
Preceded by Himself as Governor of Najd	Sultan of Najd; 1921-1922	Succeeded by Himself as Sultan of Najd and its dependencies
Preceded by Himself as Sultan of Najd	Sultan of Najd and its dependencies 1922-1926	Succeeded by Himself as King of Hejaz and Sultan of Najd and its dependencies
Preceded by Himself as Sultan of Najd and its dependencies and Ali bin Hussein (in Hejaz)	King of Hejaz and Sultan of Najd and its dependencies 1926-1927	Succeeded by Himself as King of Hejaz and Najd and its dependencies
Preceded by Himself as King of Hejaz and Sultan of Najd and its dependencies	King of Hejaz and Najd and its dependencies 1927-1932	Succeeded by Himself as King of the Kingdom of Saudi Arabia
Preceded by Himself as King of Hejaz and Najd and its dependencies	King of the Kingdom of Saudi Arabia; 1932-1953	Succeeded by Saud bin Abdulaziz
Preceded by Abdul Rahman bin Faisal	Head of the House of Saud; 1901-1953	Succeeded by Saud bin Abdulaziz
