= Faisal bin Fahd Al Saud (businessman) =

Saudi royal

- Born: Riyadh, Saudi Arabia
- Spouse: Ghana bint Khalid bin Faisal Al Saud (div.); Nouf bint Mutaib bin Abdullah bin Abdulaziz Al Saud
- Issue: 5
Names
- Faisal bin Fahd bin Abdullah bin Mohammed bin Abdul Rahman Al Saud
- House: House of Saud
- Father: Fahd bin Abdullah Al Saud
- Education: King Saud University; Emerson College

Faisal bin Fahd Al Saud (Arabic:فيصل بن فهد بن عبدالله بن محمد ال سعود) is a Saudi Arabian businessman and a member of the House of Saud.

== Early life and education ==
Prince Faisal is the son of Fahd bin Abdullah and is a great-grandson of Mohammed bin Abdul Rahman, half-brother of King Abdulaziz. He has a bachelor's degree in political science from King Saud University, and a master's degree in management, public policy and communication in the area of administration from Emerson College.

== Career ==
Prince Faisal is a businessman and is the chairman, CEO and founder of F6 Holdings and also founded FAMA Holdings in 1993, a Saudi Arabia-based marketing and investment company. He claimed that he was close to purchasing a 50% share of Liverpool F.C. for a price of $250 to $450 million in 2009.

== Personal life ==
He is married to Nouf, the daughter of Mutaib bin Abdullah Al Saud and granddaughter of former King, Abdullah of Saudi Arabia and has two children from this marriage. His former wife is Ghana bint Khalid bin Faisal Al Saud and has three children from that marriage, three sons and two daughters.

== Ancestry ==
Ancestors of Faisal bin Fahd Al Saud (businessman)

16. Abdul Rahman bin Faisal
8. Muhammad bin Abdul-Rahman
17. Sara bint Jiluwi bin Turki Al Jiluwi
4. Abdullah bin Mohammad
18. Ahmed bin Muhammed Al Sudairi
9. Hassa bint Ahmed Al Sudairi
19. Sharifa bint Ali bin Mohammed Al Suwaidi
2. Fahd bin Abdullah bin Mohammed Al Saud
20. Ibn Saud (paternal half brother of 8)
10. King Saud
21. Wadhah bint Muhammad bin Hussein Al Orair
5. Noura bint Saud
11. Lulwa Saleh Al Sabhan
1. Faisal bin Fahd bin Abdullah Al Saud
24. See 16
12. See 8
25. See 17
6. Bandar bin Mohammed bin Abdul Rahman Al Saud
26. Abdallah bin Hassan Al al-Sheikh
3. Fahda bint Bandar bin Mohammed bin Abdul Rahman Al Saud
28. See 16
14 Ibn Saud
29. Sarah Al Sudairi
7. Al Bandari bint Abdulaziz Al Saud
30. Saad bin Abd al-Muhsin Al Sudairi
15. Al Jawhara bint Saad bin Abd al-Muhsin Al Sudairi
