= Dawasir =

Arabian tribe

Al Dawasir Arabic: الدواسر
- Arab tribe
- Ethnicity: Arab
- Nisba: Al Dosari الدوسري
- Location: Saudi Arabia; Qatar; Bahrain; United Arab Emirates; Kuwait
- Language: Arabic
- Religion: Sunni Islam

The Dawasir (Arabic: الدواسر) (singular: Al Dosari, Arabic: الدوسري) are an Arab tribe in Saudi Arabia, Bahrain, Qatar, and other Gulf states. Their main base is in southern Najd, specifically in Wadi Al-Dawasir in Saudi Arabia. The Dawasir tribe is among the most powerful and influential tribes of Arabia, as they are the maternal uncles of much of the House of Saud family. The Dawasir tribe is considered one of the largest Arab tribes in terms of numbers, as their number exceeds 6 million.

== Nomenclature ==
There are various theories surrounding the definition and origin of the term "Dawasir". The two most popular theories are that it was derived from either the name of the tribe's purported forebear Dosser or the eponymous Arabic word which translates to "soldiers". Other sources include other terms such as the Arabic word for Lion or a type of Arabian horse.

== History ==
=== Saudi Arabia ===
The Dawasir tribe has historically maintained close ties with the Saudi royal family. Members of the tribe played key roles in supporting the early Saudi state militarily and politically. These connections were solidified through intermarriage, most notably between King AbdulAziz Al Saud and Hussa bint Ahmed Al Sudairi — of the Sudairi family, a respected sub-clan of the Dawasir — who became King Abdulaziz’s most influential wife. She bore seven sons, famously known as the Sudairi Seven, who went on to become some of the most powerful figures in Saudi Arabia, including Kings Fahd and Salman.

The cities of Dammam and Khobar, in Eastern Saudi Arabia, were founded in 1923 by the Dawasir tribe that migrated from Bahrain after King AbdulAziz allowed them to settle within the area. The tribe initially settled in Khobar, which was chosen for its proximity to the island of Bahrain as the tribe had hoped to go back there soon, but the British made it tough for them to maneuver, so they later settled in Dammam.

=== Bahrain ===
The Dawasir in Bahrain mainly settled in the towns of Zallaq and Budaiya. The tribe have a long history on the island of Bahrain, and on the surrounding Islands (in Qatar and Saudi Arabia). Many members of the tribe worked in the pearl industry.

The Dawasir tribe is described by Middle Eastern history expert Yitzhak Nakash as being the "second largest and most powerful tribe after the Utub [in Bahrain]. So powerful were the Dawasir that their members recognized Sheikh 'Isa Al Khalifa as ruler in name only and considered themselves immune from taxation."

The Dawasir tribe opposed the British overthrow of Sheikh Isa ibn Ali Al Khalifa (in favour of his son Hamad bin Isa Al Khalifa) in 1923. Virtually all members of the tribe left Bahrain for Dammam, Saudi Arabia after suspecting that the new ruler, Sheikh Hamad bin Isa, would attempt to tighten his control over them with British support and force them into submitting to his rule. The Dawasir were officially allowed to return in April 1927 by Sheikh Hamad after being requested by King Abdulaziz of Saudi Arabia to do so.

=== Qatar ===
The Dawasir helped determine the maritime border between Qatar and Bahrain. In the beginning of the 20th century, the broken boat of a Dawasir tribesman was repaired with the help of the ruler of Bahrain. The tribesman had laid a fish trap near the Hawar Islands; little did he and his family know that their actions, seen as largely inconsequential at the time, would directly shape the boundaries of the future states of Bahrain and Qatar and result in one of the longest and most complex cases in international law. The Hawar Islands, once claimed by both Qatar and Bahrain, are now internationally recognized as part of Bahrain, to some extent due to the affiliations between the Dawasir tribe and the ruling Khalifa family of Bahrain.

=== UAE ===
The Dawasir have a historical presence on Delma Island, Abu Dhabi. Fahad Bin Rashid Al Dosari (born in 1886 in Abu Dhabi) was a leading pearl merchant on the island, known by his name during the reign of Shakhbut Bin Sultan Al Nahyan. A mosque on the island bears his name.

== Branches of Dawasir ==
Al-Dawasir originates from a confederation of tribes of the Azd and the Banu Toghlib (Arabic: بنو تغلب), also known as Taghlib ibn Wa'il.

The 'original' Dawasir are believed to be descendants from Doser (military settlement) in Najd, Saudi Arabia. Wadi ad-Dawasir became their established homeland.

== Notable people ==
Among the tribe's members are:

- Ahmed Al Sudairi, maternal grandfather of King Fahd and King Salman of Saudi Arabia
- Abdallah Ben Abdel Mohsen At-Turki, secretary general of the Muslim World League and minister of Minister of Islamic Affairs, Dawah and Guidance
- Fahad Al-Jalajel, Saudi Minister of Health
- Hussa bint Ahmed Al Sudairi, the mother of King Fahd and King Salman, as well as the mother of Sultan, Abdul Rahman, Nayef, Turki and Ahmed
- Noora bint Hathal Al Dosari, wife of the Emir of Qatar
- Sultana bint Turki Al Sudairi, wife of King Salman
- Saleh Al-Fawzan, Saudi senior Islamic scholar
- Sara bint Ahmed Al Sudairi, mother of King Abdulaziz, founder of the Third Saudi State
- Walid al-Samaani, Saudi Minister of Justice
- Yasser Al-Dosari, Imam of Masjid al-Haram
- Yasir Al-Rumayyan, chairman of the Public Investment Fund

== Genetic genealogy ==
Multiple paternal lineages associated with the Dawasir tribe have been reported in public Y-DNA project data under E-V42 and FGC7.

== See also ==
- Tribes of Arabia
- Arabian tribes that interacted with Muhammad
