= Mohammed bin Khalid Al Saud =

Saudi businessman and royal (born 1967)

HRH Mohammed bin Khalid Al Saud
- محمد بن خالد العبد الله الفيصل

Chairman of the Board of Directors of stc group
- Incumbent
- Assumed office April 24, 2018

Personal details
- Born: Mohammed bin Khalid bin Abdullah bin Faisal bin Abdulaziz bin Abdul Rahman; 1967 (age 58–59)
- Parents: Khalid bin Abdullah bin Faisal Al Saud (father); Al Jawhara bint Khalid Al Saud (mother)
- Occupation: chairperson, executive
- Education: King Fahd University of Petroleum and Minerals; Harvard Business School

Mohammed bin Khalid Al Abdullah Al Faisal Al Saud (born 1967) is a member of House of Saud and a businessman. He has been Chairman of the Board of Directors of stc group since 2018, and Chairman of Al Faisaliah Group since 2002.

== Early life and education ==
Mohammed bin Khalid was born in 1967. He is a grandson of Abdullah bin Faisal (1923-2007) and therefore, a great grandson of King Faisal (1906-1975). Mohammed's father was Khalid bin Abdullah (1941-1983). His mother is a daughter of King Khalid, Al Jawhara, which makes him a great-grandson (from his maternal side) and a great-great-grandson (from his paternal side) of Ibn Saud.

Mohammed bin Khalid is a graduate of King Fahd University of Petroleum and Minerals and received a bachelor's degree in industrial management. He received an MBA from Harvard Business School in 1996.

== Career ==
Mohammed bin Khalid started his career at Citibank in New York and Geneva. Next he served as the assistant general manager of the Saudi American Bank for seven months.

He then held the position of Director in the Treasury Department at Samba Financial Group from 1992 to 1994, then the position of Assistant General Manager in the Investment and Finance Services Sector at Samba Financial Group from 1996 to 1997. Then in May 1997, he began to work as vice president at Al Faisaliah Group on the request of his uncle, Mohammed bin Abdullah who was then chairman of the company. The company was founded by Mohammed's grandfather Abdullah bin Faisal in 1970. Mohammed bin Khalid has been the president and director of the company since 2002. In 2018, Mohammed bin Khalid was appointed chairman of the stc group.

As of March 2022, Mohammed bin Khalid was among the financiers of the Saudi Media Group which had plans to acquire the English football club Chelsea F.C.

=== Other positions and activities ===
Mohammed bin Khalid currently serves as a member of the Board of Trustees of the Harvard Alumni Association in Saudi Arabia, a member of the Advisory Council of the President of Harvard Business School, a member of the General Assembly of the King Faisal Foundation, and a member of the Board of Directors of the King Khalid Foundation.

He previously served as a member of the King Salman Center for Disability Research. a member of the Board of Directors of the General Investment Authority, a member of the Board of Directors of Al-Khozama Management Company, a member of the National Competitiveness Center, Chairman of the Development Committee at the College of Business Administration at Alfaisal University, and Chairman of the Board of Directors of JP Morgan Saudi Arabia.
