= Prince Turki =

Prince Turki may refer to:

- Turki I bin Abdul-Aziz Al Saud (1900–1919), first son of King Abdul-Aziz and Crown Prince of Najd
- Turki II bin Abdul-Aziz Al Saud (1934–2016), son of King Abdul-Aziz and member of the Sudairi Seven
- Prince Turki Al-Faisal (1945-), former Director General of Al Mukhabarat Al A'amah and former ambassador to the United Kingdom and the United States
- Prince Turki bin Talal (1968), the fourth son of Talal bin Abdul-Aziz
- Turki bin Abdullah Al Saud (1971), embroiled in the 1Malaysia Development Berhad scandal
- Turki bin Saud bin Abdul Aziz (1953), captain of the Saudi National Snooker team
