= Khalid bin Abdullah Al Saud (1941–1985) =

Saudi businessman and royal (1941–1985)

- Born: 1941; Taif
- Died: 1985 (aged 43–44)
- Spouse: Al Jawhara bint Khalid Al Saud
- Issue: Mohammed
Names
- Khalid bin Abdullah bin Faisal bin Abdulaziz
- House: Al Saud
- Father: Prince Abdullah bin Faisal bin Abdulaziz
- Mother: Princess Al Jawhara bint Khalid bin Muhammad
- Education: Cambridge University

Khalid bin Abdullah Al Saud (1941–1985) was a member of the House of Saud and businessman. He was a grandson of King Faisal and the eldest son of Abdullah bin Faisal.

== Biography ==
Prince Khalid was born in Taif in 1941 as the eldest son of Abdullah bin Faisal and Al Jawhara bint Khalid bin Mohammed bin Abdul Rahman. His paternal grandparents were King Faisal and Sultana bint Ahmed Al Sudairi. His maternal grandfather was Khalid bin Muhammad, who was a first cousin of King Faisal; their respective fathers, Muhammad bin Abdul Rahman and King Abdulaziz, were half-brothers. Prince Khalid had six full-brothers, including Prince Mohammed.

Prince Khalid obtained a bachelor's degree in political science from Cambridge University. He started his career at the Saudi Monetary Fund and served as the director general of Arab Trade, Navigation and Aviation Corporation. Then he involved in business and cofounded a cement company.

Prince Khalid married Al Jawhara, a daughter of King Khalid. They had a son, Mohammed, who is the president and director of Al Faisaliah Group.
