= Noura bint Mohammed Al Saud =

Saudi royal and jewelry designer

- Spouse: Faisal Al Shawaf
Names
- Noura bint Mohammed bin Abdullah bin Faisal bin Abdulaziz bin Abdul Rahman bin Faisal
- House: Al Saud
- Father: Mohammed bin Abdullah Al Saud
- Mother: Nouf bint Khalid bin Abdulaziz
- Education: King Saud University

Noura bint Mohammed Al Saud (Arabic: نورة بنت محمد آل سعود) is a Saudi royal and a businesswoman. She is the founder and owner of Nuun Jewels and is a jewelry designer.

== Early life and education ==
Noura bint Mohammed was born in Saudi Arabia. She is a great-granddaughter of King Faisal. She is the daughter of Mohammed bin Abdullah, the son of Abdullah bin Faisal. Her mother is Nouf bint Khalid, a daughter of King Khalid.

Noura is a graduate of King Saud University and holds a bachelor's degree in English literature. She also studied interior design at Richmond University in London. She participated Place Vendôme workshop on jewelry in Paris.

== Career ==
Noura bint Mohammed designed various high jewellery for private clients until 2014 when she founded Nuun Jewels, a jewellery house, which is located in Rue du Faubourg Saint-Honoré, Paris. The word, Nuun, is a reference to her nickname, Nu.

In 2019 Noura also opened a branch of Nuun Jewels in Riyadh. She has exhibited her jewelry collection in different cities, including Paris, at the Four Seasons George V, Riyadh, Manama, Dubai and Monaco.

In 2018 Noura bint Mohammed started a platform to assist the design industry and emerging designers in Saudi Arabia which is named Adhlal. In 2020 Forbes Middle East named her as the sixth most successful Saudi female entrepreneur who developed a native brand.

Princess Noura has been serving as a special adviser to the Jockey Club Saudi Arabia headed by Bandar bin Khalid Al Saud since 2020.

== Personal life ==
Noura bint Mohammed lives in Riyadh and Paris, and is married to Faisal Al Shawaf, a Saudi architectural engineer and the president of Saud Consulting Services. Faisal Al Shawaf is a graduate of the Wentworth Institute of Technology, Boston.
