= Faisal bin Fahd Al Saud =

Faisal bin Fahd Al Saud may refer to:

- Faisal bin Fahd Al Saud (1945–1999), Saudi Arabian politician
- Faisal bin Fahd Al Saud (businessman), Saudi Arabian businessman
