= Sultan bin Turki Al Saud =

Saudi royal and businessman (born 1968)

- Born: 1968 (age 57–58); Riyadh
Names
- Sultan bin Turki bin Abdulaziz Al Saud
- House: Al Saud
- Father: Turki II bin Abdulaziz Al Saud
- Mother: Noura bint Abdullah bin Abdul Rahman Al Saud

Sultan bin Turki Al Saud (Arabic: سلطان بن تركي الثاني بن عبد العزيز آل سعود; born May 1968) is a member of the Saudi royal family, a grandson of King Abdulaziz. A critic of the Saudi government, he was kidnapped from Europe and brought to Saudi Arabia in 2016.

== Personal life ==
Prince Sultan was born in May 1968. His father is known as "the second" Turki (الثاني ath thānī), because he was the second son born to King Abdulaziz named "Turki". The first Prince Turki was Abdulaziz's first son who died in 1919 due to Spanish flu. Sultan's mother is Noura, the daughter of Abdullah bin Abdul Rahman.

Prince Sultan lived in Geneva. He was married to King Abdullah's daughter, Princess Noura who died in 1990 in a car accident near Riyadh airport. He has one son named Mohammed bin Sultan from another marriage.

== Kidnappings ==
In 2004, Prince Sultan accused the government of Saudi Arabia of kidnapping him in June 2003 in Switzerland after he spoke out in favour of reform in Saudi Arabia. He was lured to a meeting in Geneva where he was drugged before being flown back to the Kingdom and was kept under house arrest in Riyadh. To finish the mission successfully, a Boeing 747 medical evacuation aircraft was sent especially for this purpose after sedating him. The aircraft arrived at Geneva Airport a few days before the kidnapping operation, and was in a constant state of readiness. Another aircraft was sent to carry the personal effects, papers, files and documents of Prince Sultan, which were later confiscated from the hotel where he had been staying and taken to Riyadh. The aircraft was officially registered in Switzerland as part of the entourage of Prince Abdul Aziz bin Fahd, who was visiting Switzerland at the time.

According to newspaper reports, on 1 February 2016 Prince Sultan was again kidnapped, with his entourage of about 20 people. They were on a flight from Paris whose ostensible destination was Cairo: it was diverted to Riyadh where all were detained. After some days the non-Saudis in the party were released. In August 2017, Prince Sultan was apparently still in Saudi Arabia.

The kidnapping was one of three disappearances of Saudi princes living in Europe that featured in the 2017 BBC News Channel documentary Kidnapped! Saudi Arabia's Missing Princes.

His kidnappings were described as one of many disappearances of members of the Saudi Royal family who have criticized the government or called for regime change.
