= Saud bin Abdullah Al Saud =

Saudi royal, military officer, and businessman (1946–2020)

- Born: 1946
- Died: 4 June 2020 (aged 73–74)
- Burial: 5 June 2020; Al Oud cemetery, Riyadh
- Issue: Faisal bin Saud; Khalid bin Saud
Names
- Saud bin Abdullah bin Faisal bin Abdulaziz bin Abdul Rahman
- House: Al Saud
- Father: Abdullah bin Faisal Al Saud
- Mother: Noura bint Assaf Al Assaf
- Education: Sandhurst Military Academy

Saud bin Abdullah Al Saud (Arabic: سعود بن عبدالله آل سعود; 1946 – 4 June 2020) was a Saudi military official, businessman and a member of the Saudi royal family. He was a grandson of King Faisal, having been born to the king's eldest son, Prince Abdullah.

== Early life and education ==
Prince Saud was born in 1946. He was one of Abdullah bin Faisal's children. His mother was Noura bint Assaf Al Assaf.

Prince Saud graduated from Sandhurst Military Academy in 1966.

== Career ==
After graduation Prince Saud joined the Saudi Army where he worked until 1976. Then he involved in business. He was the chairman, CEO and shareholder of Saudi Investment Group and Marketing Ltd and also, the chairman of the Riyadh Exhibitions Company. Prince Saud was the managing director of Arabian Establishment for Trade and Shipping Ltd based in Jeddah which was founded by his father in 1963. He was one of the founders of the Dar Al Maal Al Islami Trust which was initiated by his half-uncle Mohammed bin Faisal Al Saud in 1981.

== Personal life and death ==
Prince Saud had two sons, Faisal and Khalid. The former married a daughter of Saud bin Nayef Al Saud in October 2010. Khalid bin Abdullah has been the deputy governor of the Tabuk province since 12 December 2023.

Prince Saud died on 4 June 2020. Funeral prayers were performed for him the next day in Riyadh.
