= Abdullah bin Faisal Al Saud (1923–2007) =

Saudi royal, politician, and businessman

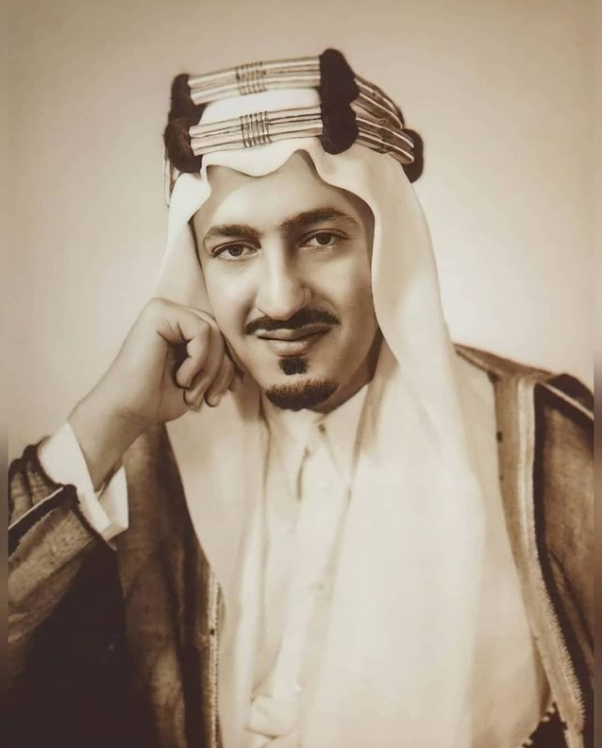
- Prince Abdullah in the early 1950s

Governor of Hejaz
- Tenure: 1946–1949
- Predecessor: Mansour bin Abdulaziz
- Monarch: Abdulaziz

Minister of Interior
- Tenure: 2 June 1951 – 30 March 1959
- Predecessor: Faisal bin Abdulaziz
- Successor: Faisal bin Abdulaziz
- Monarch: Abdulaziz; Saud

Minister of Health
- Tenure: 1950–1953
- Predecessor: Office established
- Successor: Rashad Pharaon
- Monarch: Abdulaziz; Saud
- Born: 20 June 1922; Riyadh, Nejd
- Died: 8 May 2007 (aged 84); Jeddah, Saudi Arabia
- Burial: Al Adl cemetery, Mecca
- Spouse: Al Jawhara bint Khalid bin Mohammed
- Issue: 10
Names
- Abdullah bin Faisal bin Abdulaziz Al Saud
- House: Al Saud
- Father: King Faisal
- Mother: Sultana bint Ahmed Al Sudairi

Abdullah bin Faisal Al Saud (Arabic: عبد الله بن فيصل آل سعود ʿAbd Allāh bin Fayṣal Āl Suʿūd; 20 June 1923 – 8 May 2007) was a Saudi Arabian businessman, politician, and poet who held multiple posts in the Saudi government throughout the 1940s and 1950s. Prince Abdullah was the eldest son of Faisal and one of the grandsons of Saudi Arabia's founder King Abdulaziz. He served as the governor of Hejaz during the reign of Abdulaziz, and as the minister of health and interior during the reigns of his grandfather and uncle Saud. These positions made him one of the most powerful Saudi Arabian royals of his time.

== Early life and education ==
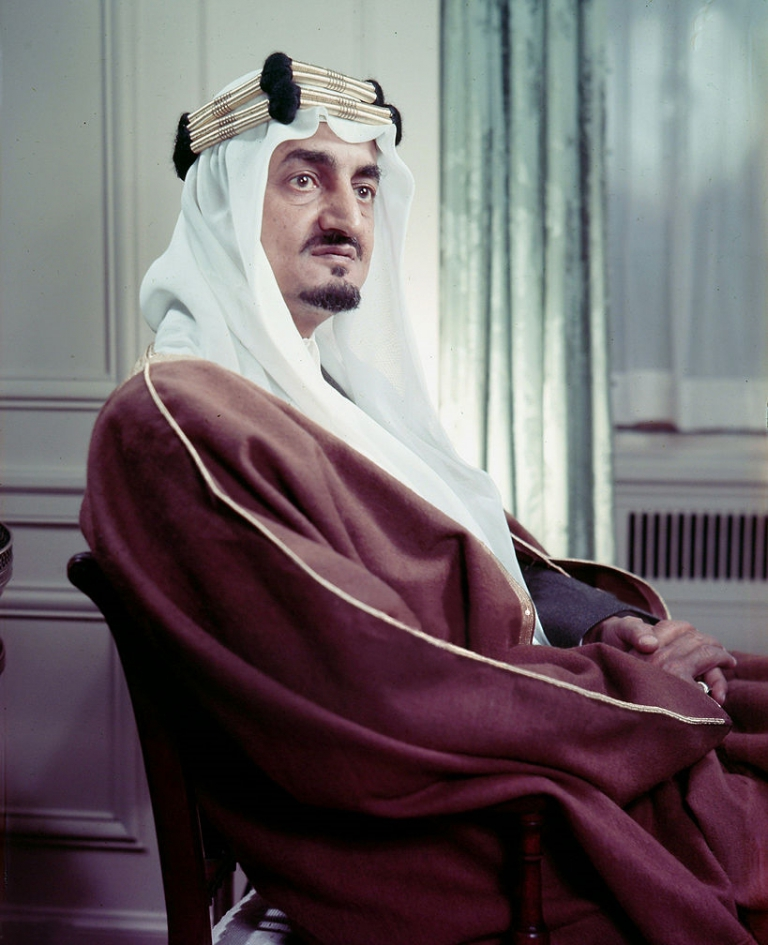
King Faisal, father of Prince Abdullah

Prince Abdullah was born in Riyadh in 1922. However, some sources list his birth year as 1921 or 1922. He was the eldest son of King Faisal. His mother was Sultana bint Ahmed Al Sudairi, sister of Hussa bint Ahmed Al Sudairi.

It is believed that Prince Abdullah was the second grandson of Abdulaziz after Faisal bin Turki who was born in 1918. The marriage of Prince Faisal and Sultana bint Ahmed was prearranged while Prince Faisal was travelling abroad. They never saw each other until the marriage and later divorced.

Abdullah bin Faisal completed his education in Mecca in 1939.

== Career ==
Abdullah bin Faisal assumed a number of government positions. He started his political career in 1945 when he disputed his half-uncle Mansour's appointment as acting viceroy of Hejaz and actually assumed the office one year later.

Prince Abdullah was the first minister of health of Saudi Arabia and appointed to the post in 1950. Then, he was named minister of interior in 1951, being the first interior minister of the Kingdom. He served in this post during the reign of King Abdulaziz and also, of King Saud. His appointment as minister of health and of interior was a move to make him equal in status to then-minister of defense Prince Mishaal. His term lasted until March 1959 when he resigned, and he was replaced by his father, Crown Prince Faisal, in the post of interior minister.

== Business activities ==
Following his retirement from government jobs, Abdullah bin Faisal devoted his time to business and cultural activities. First, he dealt with real estate business in Jeddah. He established Saudi Arabian Agricultural and Dairy Company which was a joint venture with Lebanese businessmen.

Abdullah bin Faisal was the founder of Al Faisaliah Group, which was established in Jeddah in 1971. He also owned the largest dairy farm in Saudi Arabia. In addition, he founded Abdullah Establishment for Trading and Industry in Jeddah in 1978 and the SIGMA (Saudi Investment Group and Marketing) company in 1979. The chairman and CEO of the latter was his son, Prince Saud.

Prince Abdullah's business partners included the sons of Rashad Pharaon, Ghaith, and Mazen. He was one of the founders of the Dar Al Maal Al Islami Trust which was initiated by his half-brother Mohammed bin Faisal Al Saud in 1981.

=== Other positions ===
Abdullah bin Faisal was the founder of the King Faisal International Charity Foundation. He was the chairman of the King Faisal Foundation. He was the cofounder and former chairman of Al Ahli football club.

== Works ==
A composer of both classical and colloquial poetry, his works include the collection The Inspiration of Deprivation (Min Wahye al Hirman), 1980.

Prince Abdullah's poems were put into music and sung by the Egyptian singer Umm Kulthum and many others. Some of them were translated into English, French and Russian.

== Awards ==
Abdullah bin Faisal received a number of international honors including an honorary doctorate degree in humanities. He was rewarded with French State Acknowledgement Award for Literature in 1984. In May 1989, he was given honorary doctorate degree, doctorate of humane letters, from Shaw University.

== Personal life ==
Prince Abdullah married three times. One of his spouses was Al Jawhara bint Khalid, a daughter of Khalid bin Muhammad and a granddaughter of Muhammad bin Abdul Rahman, who was an uncle of Prince Abdullah's father King Faisal. Al Jawhara bint Khalid died at age 87 in 2005. Another spouse of Prince Abdullah was the granddaughter of Saad bin Abdul Rahman, another of King Faisal's uncles. His third spouse was the daughter of a Bedouin tribe leader.

Prince Abdullah had ten children:

- Prince Khalid (1941–1985)
- Prince Mohammed (1943–2011), who married Nouf bint Khalid, a daughter of King Khalid, and Noura bint Bandar, a daughter of Bandar bin Mohammed and Al Bandari bint Abdulaziz.
- Prince Bandar (deceased)
- Prince Abdul Rahman, who is married to Nouf bint Faisal, a daughter of Luluwah bint Abdulaziz.
- Prince Saud (1946–2020)
- Prince Talal (deceased)
- Prince Sultan
- Prince Turki
- Prince Faisal
- Princess Sultana

== Death ==
Prince Abdullah died on 8 May 2007. Funeral prayers were performed at the Masjid al Haram in Mecca. A number of royal family members attended the funeral, including his half-brothers Prince Saud and Prince Khalid and the Crown Prince of Saudi Arabia, Sultan bin Abdulaziz. Prince Abdullah was buried in Al Adl cemetery in Mecca next to his first wife, Al Jawhara.

== Legacy ==
In November 2018, the International Prize Prince Abdullah Al Faisal for Arabic Poetry was launched.
