= Khalid bin Muhammad Al Saud =

Saudi royal (1904–1938)

- Born: 1904
- Died: March 1938 (aged 33–34)
- Spouse: Noura bint Abdulaziz Al Saud
- Issue: Al Jawhara; Fahd; Saad; Saud
- House: Al Saud
- Father: Muhammad bin Abdul Rahman Al Saud

Khalid bin Muhammad Al Saud (Arabic: خالد بن محمد آل سعود; 1904 – March 1938) was a member of the Saudi royal family. He was the eldest son of Muhammad bin Abdul Rahman who was the half-brother of King Abdulaziz.

== Biography ==
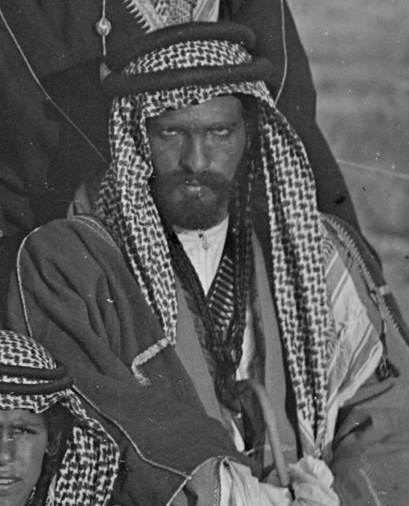
Muhammad bin Abdul Rahman, the father of Khalid

Khalid was born in 1904 and was the eldest son of Muhammad bin Abdul Rahman. His grandfather, Abdul Rahman bin Faisal bin Turki, was the former short-term Emir of Nejd, and his uncle was the ruling Emir Abdulaziz. Khalid participated in the battles led by Abdulaziz which resulted in the formation of the Kingdom of Saudi Arabia. However, later on, particularly following the capture of Hejaz and Abdulaziz's proclamation as King of Hejaz and Nejd, Khalid and Muhammad had difficult relations with Abdulaziz. It is alleged that Khalid twice attempted to assassinate King Abdulaziz's eldest son and designated heir, Prince Saud, in 1927 and in 1930 in order to become king himself. Khalid and his father did not support the elimination of the Ikhwan in 1929.

In May 1933 when Prince Saud was announced as the crown prince, Khalid's father Muhammad did not attend the ceremony, but Khalid was there to pledge his allegiance to Saud. In 1934 Khalid was one of the commanders of the Saudi forces in the battle against the Yemeni forces, along with his cousin Prince Faisal (later King Faisal). Khalid and Faisal successfully defeated the Yemenis. In late 1934 Khalid, however, was among the Al Saud family members who signed a petition and sent a letter to King Abdulaziz explaining their opposition to Crown Prince Saud. The others included his father and his uncles Abdullah and Ahmed, among others.

In 1934 Khalid married Noura bint Abdulaziz, only full sister of the future King Faisal. King Abdulaziz hoped the marriage would improve his nephew's allegiance to him, but this did not work. In March 1938 Khalid died in a hunting accident under mysterious conditions. Semi-official newspaper of the Kingdom Umm Al Qura reported his death on 1 April 1938 citing no detail: "Prince Khalid had passed away earlier this week."

Khalid had four children: a daughter, Al Jawhara, and three sons, Fahd, Saad and Saud. His daughter, Al Jawhara, married the eldest son of King Faisal, Abdullah, and they had seven children, including Khalid and Mohammed.
