= Nayef bin Fawwaz Al Sha'lan =

Saudi Arabian prince, diplomat, and businessman (born 1956)

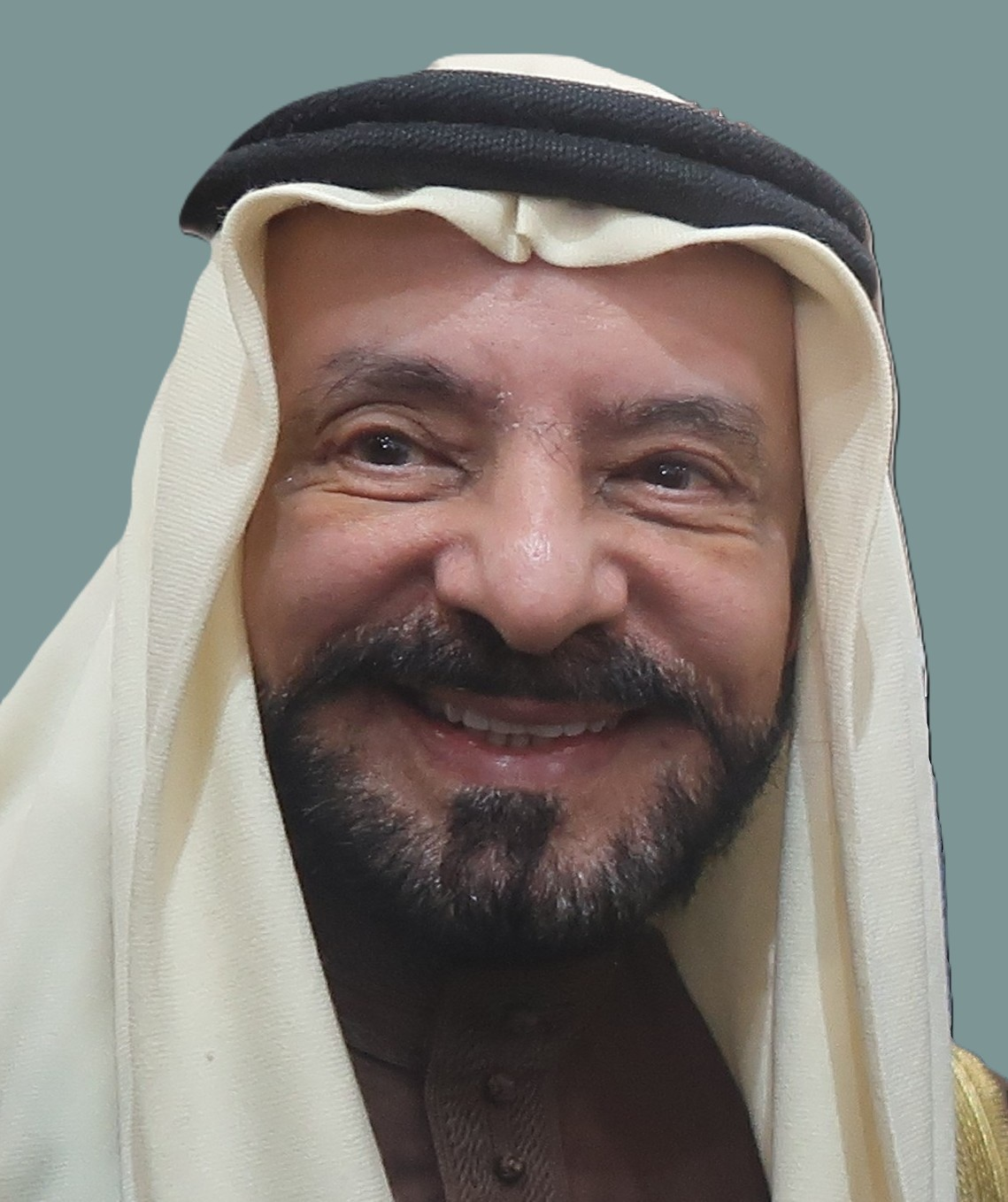
- Born: 1956 (age 69–70)
- House: Al Shaalan
- Father: Fawwaz Al Shaalan

Nayef bin Fawwaz Al Shaalan Al Ruwaily (born 1956) (Arabic: نايف بن فواز الشعلان) is a Saudi Arabian diplomat and businessman. A grandson of King Abdulaziz and Prince Nuri Al Shaalan, Nayef is a prince and a member of the House of Al-Shaalan.

== Business career ==
Nayef invested in the oil business in Colombia and Venezuela.

In 1999, he smuggled two tons of cocaine from Venezuela to France. He was accused by the French government of using his diplomatic status to transport the drugs onto his private Boeing 727 jet. He escaped sentencing, and was convicted in absentia in 2007. The United States government also indicted him with conspiracy to distribute cocaine.

== Personal life ==
Nayef speaks eight languages. He lived in the United States from the mid-1970s to the mid-1980s. He is a grandson of Prince Nuri al-Shaalan and a maternal grandson of the founding monarch of Saudi, King Abdulaziz. Nayef's older brother, Nawaf, is married to a daughter of King Abdullah. Nayef has a twin brother, Saud.

Nayef is a nephew and son-in-law of Abdul Rahman bin Abdulaziz Al Saud, Saudi Arabia's former deputy minister of defense and aviation. Nayef's brother, Saud, is also the son-in-law of Prince Abdul Rahman.
