= Al Jawhara bint Fahd Al Saud =

Saudi royal and academic

Rector of Noura bint Abdul Rahman University
- In office: 2009 – 2013
- Predecessor: Office established
- Successor: Hoda bint Mohammed Al Amil
- Spouse: Saud bin Mohammed bin Abdulaziz
Names
- Al Jawhara bint Fahd bin Mohammed bin Abdul Rahman bin Faisal
- House: House of Saud
- Father: Fahd bin Mohammed bin Abdul Rahman
- Mother: Muda bint Assaf
- Education: College of Education for Girls

Al Jawhara bint Fahd Al Saud (Arabic: الجوهرة بنت فهد آل سعود); was a Saudi royal, an academic and a member of the Consultative Assembly of Saudi Arabia.

== Early life and education ==
Al Jawhara bint Fahd was a daughter of Fahd bin Mohammed and Muda bint Assaf. Her father was the second eldest son of Mohammed bin Abdul Rahman, half-brother of King Abdulaziz. She received a bachelor's degree in arts and education from the College of Education for Girls in Riyadh.

== Career ==
Al Jawhara bint Fahd was a faculty member at the department of Arabic language and literature at her alma mater. She also worked as an assistant undersecretary for educational affairs at the Ministry of Girls' Colleges and as the dean of the College of Education for Girls in Riyadh. She served as the rector of Noura bint Abdul Rahman University from 2009 to 2013, being the first rector of the university. She was replaced by Hoda bint Mohammed Al Amil in the post.

In October 2020 Al Jawhara bint Fahd was made a member of the Shura Council or Consultative Assembly for four years.

== Personal life ==
Al Jawhara bint Fahd's husband was Prince Saud bin Mohammed bin Abdulaziz Al Saud who died in December 2015.
