= Rashad Pharaon =

Syrian-born Saudi physician and politician (1912–1990)

Minister of Health
- In office 1954 – July 1960
- Prime Minister: King Faisal
- Preceded by: Abdullah bin Faisal Al Saud
- Succeeded by: Hassan bin Yousef Nassief

Personal details
- Born: 1912 Syria
- Died: 1990 (aged 77–78)
- Children: 5, including Ghaith Pharaon

Rashad Pharaon (Arabic: رشاد فرعون; 1912–1990) was a Syrian-born Saudi Arabian medical doctor who served as the personal physician of Ibn Saud, founder of Saudi Arabia. He also held various official posts during the reigns of three consecutive Saudi kings, King Saud, King Faisal and King Khalid.

== Early life and education ==
Rashad Pharaon was born in Syria in 1912. His father was a Syrian merchant who had connections with the Al Saud family during the Ottoman rule in Arabia as well as at the formation period of Saudi Arabia.

Pharaon studied medicine in Damascus and became a surgeon.

== Career and views ==
Pharaon began to serve as the private physician of Ibn Saud from 1936 which he held until Ibn Saud's death in 1953. Shukri Quwatli, future president of Syria, was instrumental in Rashad's migration to Saudi Arabia. Pharaon was briefly the Saudi ambassador to Spain from 1953 to 1954 and was made the minister of health in 1954 which he held until July 1960. Next, he served as the Saudi ambassador to France between 1960 and 1966. From 1966 to 1982 he was the senior policy adviser to King Faisal and then, to King Khalid.

Based on the statements of Ahmed bin Abdul Wahap Russian Arabist Alexei Vassiliev reports that Pharaon was the closest person to King Faisal during his reign. He acted as the personal advisor of Faisal who was instrumental in the appointment of Rashad as minister of health when he was the crown prince and prime minister. Although he was a native of Syria, Pharaon was among the allies of the king who were opponents of the Syrian Ba'ath regime. He continued to enjoy a high status under King Khalid and was the only non-royal official who participated in the meetings of the king with foreign leaders.

== Personal life and death ==
His family became one of the richest families in Saudi Arabia having various assets and investments. Pharaon had five children, three sons and two daughters. His son, Ghaith Pharaon, was a businessman who received a bachelor's degree from Stanford University and an MBA from Harvard University. His another son, Mazen, was also a businessman, and Rashad Pharaon's both sons had business partnership with Prince Abdullah, eldest son of King Faisal.

Rashad Pharaon died in 1990.
