= Omar A. Ali =

Somali businessperson

Omar Abdi Ali عمر عبدي علي
- Occupation: entrepreneur
- Known for: CEO of Dar al-Maal al-Islami Trust (DMI Trust); CEO of Integrated Property Investments Limited & Quadron investments

Omar Abdi Ali (Somali: Cumar Cabdi Cali, Arabic: عمر عبدي علي) is a Somali entrepreneur, accountant, financial consultant, philanthropist, and a leading specialist on Islamic finance. From 1986 to 1999, he was CEO of Dar al-Maal al-Islami Trust (DMI Trust), a Middle Eastern financial and banking group, which under his management increased its assets from US$1.6 billion to US$4.0 billion. Omar is currently the chairman and founder of the multinational real estate corporation Integrated Property Investments Limited and its sister company Quadron Investments.

== Biography ==
Omar graduated in 1964 as a certified accountant from the Leeds College of Commerce in the United Kingdom. He returned to Somalia, where he joined the Ministry of Finance and became a Deputy Accountant General. He also assumed the role of Director of Finance in the Bantu African Development Bank, helping transform the pilot project into a multi-regional initiative.

== Career ==
From 1974 to 1983, Omar took up positions in the Gulf States and Europe as a financial consultant. In 1983, he became CEO of the Islamic financial institution the DMI Trust based in Geneva, Switzerland. Under his tenure, DMI became a leading Islamic Financial Institution and its assets increased from US$1.6 billion to US$4 billion, with Omar managing a worldwide staff of 1,400 employees on three continents. He became Vice-President of the Bahraini Faisal Private Bank, and established their most profitable branches in Pakistan, Switzerland and New Jersey in the United States. In 2009, Omar together with his business partner Suleiman A. Dualeh entered an agreement with Shelter Afrique that will see their corporation Integrated Property Investments Ltd take on an ambitious housing project worth US$624 million in Dar es Salaam, Tanzania known as the Bahari Beach satellite town.

== Education ==
- Certified Accountant from the Leeds College of Commerce
- Fellow of the Association of Chartered Certified Accountants
