= Qaṣr 'Atīqa =

Historic building in Riyadh

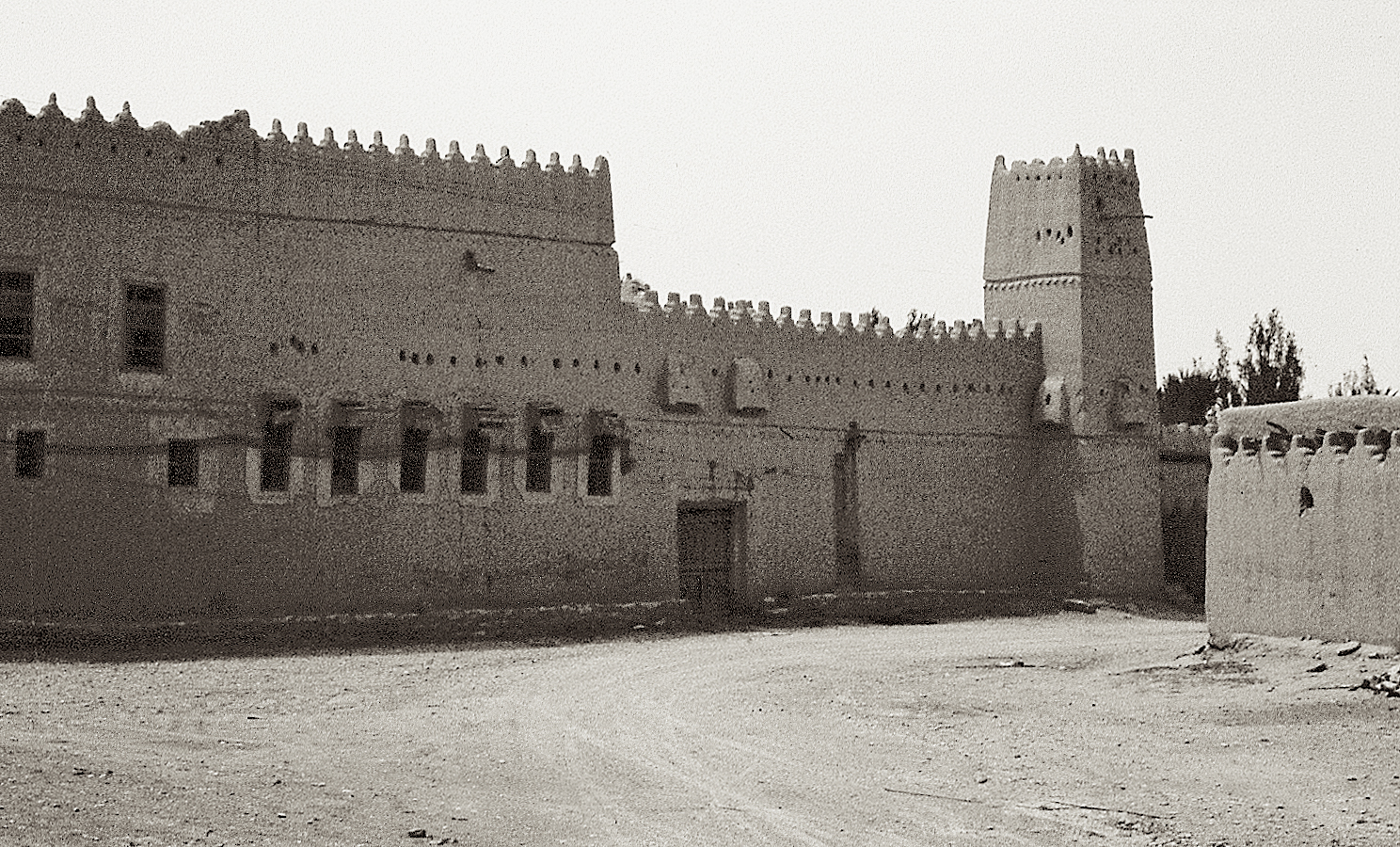
- Qaṣr 'Atīqa near Riyadh in 1974
- Interactive map of the Qaṣr 'Atīqa area

General information
- Architectural style: Najdi architecture
- Location: Riyadh, Saudi Arabia
- Coordinates: 24°36′12″N 46°42′8″E
- Completed: 1922

Qaṣr 'Atīqa (Arabic: قصرعتيقة, romanized: Qaṣr ʿAtīqa, lit. 'Atiqa Palace') was a fortified palace near Riyadh, Saudi Arabia. It was one of the earliest palaces erected outside the old town. The palace was built in 1922 and served as the residence of Muhammad bin Abdul Rahman Al Saud, a brother of King ʾAbd al-ʿAzīz Ibn Saud. The building stood near Wadi Hanifa, not far from the current mosque of Muhammad bin Abdulrahman bin Faiṣal Al Saud.
