= Princess Nourah Bint Abdul Rahman University =

Public women's university in Riyadh, Saudi Arabia

Princess Nourah Bint Abdulrahman University
- جامعة الأميرة نورة بنت عبد الرحمن
- Former names: Riyadh University for Women (until 2008)
- Motto: Empowerment
- Type: Public university
- Established: 1970; 56 years ago
- Rector: Dr. Inas bint Suleiman bin Mohammed Al-Issa
- Vice Rector: Fawzia bint Mohammed Abalkhail
- Academic staff: 3767
- Administrative staff: 2161
- Students: 33,825
- Postgraduates: 777
- Doctoral students: 331
- Location: Riyadh, Saudi Arabia; 24.846°N 46.72°E
- Colors: Turquoise
- Website: www.pnu.edu.sa/en (in English)

Princess Nourah Bint Abdulrahman University (PNU; Arabic: جامعة الأميرة نورة بنت عبد الرحمن), formerly Riyadh University for Women, is a public women's university in Riyadh, Saudi Arabia. It is the largest women's university in the world. Established in 1970 during the reign of King Faisal bin Abdulalziz, it assumed its current name in 2008 when it was granted university status by King Abdullah bin Abdulaziz and is named after Noura bint Abdul Rahman, elder sister and adviser of King Abdulaziz ibn Saud and the eldest daughter of Abdul Rahman bin Faisal, the last emir of the Second Saudi State.

The university offers diplomas, bachelor and postgraduate degrees. It has 34 colleges in the city of Riyadh and in the neighbouring cities, an Arabic Language Institute (for non-speakers of Arabic), a Deanship of Community Service and Continuous Education, and a Community College. It has more than 5,000 academic and administrative staff.

== History and name ==
The university was founded in 1970 as the first College of Education for women in the Kingdom. Within the following 25 years, there were 102 similar colleges in 72 cities around the country, accommodating 60,000 students. There were 6 colleges in the city of Riyadh alone, primarily in the fields of education, social service, science, arts, and home economics. In 2004, the decision was made to unify all of the women's colleges in Riyadh, thus creating the first all-female university in the Kingdom. Other colleges around the Kingdom were unified and expanded in their respected regions into independent universities.

In 2008, the Custodian of the Two Holy Mosques, King Abdullah bin Abdulaziz Al Saud inaugurated the campus and changed the university's name to "Princess Nourah Bint Abdulrahman University" after Princess Nourah bint Abdulrahman, the sister of the country's first king and leader, King Abdulaziz. Nourah in Arabic means "light." With this launch was the building of the world's largest and most modern women's institution of higher education in a self-contained higher education city. The first rector was Princess Al Jawhara bint Fahd Al Saud.

On 12 June 2011, the new campus was opened in an official ceremony by the Custodian of the Two Holy Mosques, King Abdullah bin Abdulaziz Al Saud, during which he said:

"Women carry a responsibility that is more than a duty, to maintain the stability of society and contribute to building the economy of the nation, and to represent the community and the nation to the highest standards, outside and inside the country. To be the caring mother, exemplary citizen and productive employee. Outside the nation, to be the ambassador of her country and community, and to represent well her religion, faith and our values."

In February 2017, the university was the host of the first-ever opera in Saudi Arabia. The show, "Antar and Alba", was produced by Opera Lebanon.

== Colleges and Departments ==
Health Colleges

- College of Medicine
  - Basic Sciences
- College of Dentistry
  - Preventive Dental Sciences
  - Clinical Dental Sciences
  - Basic Dental Sciences
- College of Nursing
- College of Pharmacy
  - Pharmaceutical Sciences
  - Clinical Pharmacy
- College of Health and Rehabilitation Sciences
  - Rehabilitation Sciences
  - Health Sciences
  - Medical Technology
  - Communication Sciences

Science Colleges

- College of Business and Administration
  - Economics
  - Law
  - Business Administration
  - Accounting
- College of Computer and Information Science
  - Computer Sciences
  - Information Systems
  - Networking and Telecommunication Systems
- College of Science
  - Physics
  - Chemistry
  - Mathematical Sciences
  - Biology

Humanities Colleges

- College of Art and Design
  - Interior Design
  - Graphic Design and Digital Media
  - Painting and Printmaking
  - Fashion Design and Textiles
- College of Art
  - Arabic Language and Literature
  - English Language and Literature
  - Geography
  - History and Civilization
  - Library and Information
  - Islamic Studies
- College of Education
  - Curriculum and Instruction
  - Early Childhood
  - Special Needs Education
  - Psychology
- College of Home Economics
  - Nutrition & Food Science
- College of Social Work
- College of Languages and Translation
  - English Language and Translation
  - French Language and Translation
- Community College
  - Computer Sciences and Information Technology
  - Administrative Sciences

The Deanship of Community Service and Continuous Education offers various diploma options. The Arabic Language Institute (for non-speakers of Arabic) offers grant scholarships to non-speakers of Arabic from different countries. The institute has over 350 students from more than 40 countries.

In early 2018, the university became the first in the Kingdom to offer a driving school for women, following the allowance of King Salman to grant women the right to drive in the Kingdom. More than 50,000 female students are expected to take part. Despite these advancements Saudi Arabia still has some of the worst rates of unemployment among women in the world

Preparatory Year Program (PYP):

To ensure quality and a smooth transition into university life, PNU students are required to enroll in a two-year preparatory program of necessary skills, such as:

- Study skills
- Intensive English program
- Communication skills
- Computer skills

== Campus services and facilities ==
=== Description ===
The campus was constructed in a record time of two years, supported by 75,000 construction workers and the latest building machinery and methodologies. It is 13 million square meters in size, with a maximum capacity of 60,000 students. The campus has 600 high-tech smart buildings, large-capacity student residencies, various models of faculty residence units, and three spacious, state-of-the-art recreation centers. In addition, it has pre-schools, primary schools, intermediate and secondary schools. It also has an elegant central library, research centers, a university hospital, student support centers, student-accessible sport facilities, a convention center and an automated metro system by Hitachi Rail Italy.

=== Health and Wellness ===
Sports Facilities include a number of sports halls (basketball, volleyball, aerobics, bicycles, etc.) as well as an Olympic-sized swimming pool. In 2016, the university signed a Memorandum of Understanding with the General Authority for Sports, aiming to increase participation in sports to 40% by 2030.

=== Sustainable Design ===
- Water recycling plant
- Solar thermal plant
- 4000 sq. meters of Solar Panels, which provide 16% of heating and 18% of air-conditioning needs

38 of the university's buildings, totaling a million square meters, have been submitted for a Leadership in Energy and Environmental Design (LEED) green building rating and the library has applied for the second highest LEED "Gold" rating.

== Central Library ==
The library holds over 2 million books in both Arabic and English with a maximum capacity of 5 million, in addition to numerous journal subscriptions, government publications, dissertations, databases, and manuscripts.

== Research Centers ==
Social Research and Women's Studies

- Social Science Research.
- Women's Studies Research
- Human and Social Development Research
- Natural Sciences Research Center

Aljazeera Chair

Academic Societies Established

- Saudi Society for Child Care.
- Arabic Language Society.

== Student Support Centers ==
- Clubs and Student Councils
- Meeting Rooms and Offices
- Media and screening rooms
- Restaurants and Cafes
- Banquet Halls
- Bookstore
- Pharmacy
- Supermarket
- Bank

== Convention center ==
- 2 large halls
- 2,700 seats (largest in the country)
- 1,350 seats
- 13 conference and meeting rooms.

== Transportation ==
Due to the physical size of the campus, an efficient means of transporting students needed to be developed. To this end, an 11.5 km automated guideway transit system, the Princess Nora bint Abdul Rahman University Automated People Mover (PNU-APM), was constructed. The network, built to light metro standards, opened in 2012 and has 4 lines and 14 stations. It has 22 two car AnsaldoBreda Driverless Metro trains, each having a maximum capacity of up to 110 passengers and a maximum speed of 60 km/h. The driverless technology used in the trains is the same as that of the Copenhagen Metro.

== International partnerships ==
- University of Auckland in New Zealand
- University of Southern Denmark in Scandinavia
- Valencia College in the United States
- Rouen University in France
- Erasmus University Rotterdam in the Netherlands
- Monash University in Australia
- Dublin City University in Ireland

== Memberships in Regional and International Associations ==
- International Association of Universities
- Federation of the Universities of the Islamic World
- Association of Arab Universities
- The Society of Arab Universities
- The Scientific Society of Arab Nursing Faculties
- Colleges of Computing and Information Society
- Association of Social Services
- American Council on Education
- Association of Colleges of Fine Arts
- Scientific Society for Arab Faculties f Medicine
- Society of Colleges of Science

== Rankings ==
According to UNIRANKS – The World’s Largest University Rankings, Princess Nourah Bint Abdul Rahman University was ranked 11th nationally among universities in Saudi Arabia in 2025.

== See also ==
- Education in Saudi Arabia
- List of universities and colleges in Saudi Arabia
- Women's rights in Saudi Arabia
