= Hussa bint Ahmed Al Sudairi =

One of King Abdulaziz's spouses (1900–1969)

- Born: 1900; Al Ghat
- Died: 1969 (aged 68–69); Riyadh
- Spouses: Abdulaziz of Saudi Arabia (m. 1913, div. 1910s) (m. 1919; died 1953): Muhammad bin Abdul Rahman Al Saud (1910s)
- Issue: List: Prince Abdullah bin Muhammad King Fahd bin Abdulaziz Crown Prince Sultan bin Abdulaziz Princess Luluwah bint Abdulaziz Prince Abdul Rahman bin Abdulaziz Crown Prince Nayef bin Abdulaziz Prince Turki bin Abdulaziz King Salman bin Abdulaziz Prince Ahmed bin Abdulaziz Princess Latifa bint Abdulaziz Princess Al Jawhara bint Abdulaziz Princess Jawahir bint Abdulaziz
Names
- Hussa bint Ahmed bin Mohammad Al Sudairi
- House: Al Sudairi (by birth); Al Saud (by marriage)
- Father: Ahmed bin Muhammad Al Sudairi
- Mother: Sharifa bint Ali bin Mohammed Al Swayed

Hussa bint Ahmed Al Sudairi (Arabic: حصة بنت أحمد السديري; 1900–1969) was one of the wives of King Abdulaziz of Saudi Arabia, with whom she had seven sons and four daughters. Her sons included two future Saudi kings, Fahd and Salman, as well as Sultan bin Abdulaziz and Nayef bin Abdulaziz, who both later served as crown prince, both dying in that position. Her sons with Abdulaziz are commonly known as the Sudairi Seven.

== Background ==
Hussa bint Ahmed was a member of the influential Al Sudairi family from Najd. The family are part of the noble Dawasir tribe. The mother of King Abdulaziz, Sara bint Ahmed Al Sudairi, was also a member of the Sudairi family and daughter of Hussa's great-grandfather, Ahmed bin Muhammed Al Sudairi.

Hussa's mother was Sharifa bint Ali bin Mohammed Al Swayed. Her father, Ahmed bin Muhammed Al Sudairi, was a powerful chief of the Sudairi tribe and one of the early supporters of King Abdulaziz during the latter's attempts to conquer Saudi Arabia. Following the formation of the state, her father served as governor in Washm, Sudair, Qassim and Aflaj provinces. Her brothers were also appointed by King Abdulaziz as governors. Turki bin Ahmed was the governor of Asir Province; Abdulaziz bin Ahmed was the governor of the former provinces of Quraiyat al Milh and Wadi Sirhan; Khalid bin Ahmed was the governor of Tabuk Province; Muhammad bin Ahmed was the governor of Northern Province; Abdul Rahman bin Ahmad was the governor of Jauf and Musa'id bin Ahmed the governor of Jizan Province. Khalid bin Ahmed also served as the governor of Najran Province and as the minister of agriculture.

== Early years and marriage ==
Hussa bint Ahmed was born in the town of Al Ghat in 1900. Her father was Ahmed bin Mohammed Al Sudairi (1869–1936) and her mother was Sharifa bint Ali bin Mohammed Al Swayed.

King Abdulaziz married her twice. She was his 8th wife, and first cousin once removed via Ahmed bin Mohammed bin Turki Al Sudairi. They first married in 1913 when she was thirteen-years-old. They divorced after a few years, but remarried in 1919. In the period between their first and second marriages, Hussa bint Ahmed married King Abdulaziz’s younger half brother, Muhammad bin Abdul Rahman. Hussa had a son from this marriage, Abdullah bin Muhammad.

It is assumed that King Abdulaziz remained in love with Hussa bint Ahmed, and therefore, forced his half-brother to divorce her so that he could remarry her. Hussa bint Ahmed had a private palace, but in 1938 she moved to the newly constructed Murabba Palace with King Abdulaziz. She remained married with King Abdulaziz until the latter's death in 1953.

=== Children ===
Hussa bint Ahmed and King Abdulaziz had eleven children together, including seven sons. No other spouse of King Abdulaziz produced more sons than Hussa Al Sudairi. Hussa bint Ahmed became the most valued spouse of King Abdulaziz due to being mother of seven sons. In Arab culture, the most prominent wife is the one who gives birth to the largest number of sons. Therefore, Hussa had the advantage of being a "mother of boys." Her sons with King Abdulaziz are known as the Sudairi Seven. They were also called the "magnificent seven." Hussa and King Abdulaziz's children are as follows:

- Sa'ad (I) Robert Lacey in his book The Kingdom states that Princess Hussa actually mothered Sa'ad which is also said by other sources. He was born in 1913 and died in 1919 during the Spanish flu pandemic.
- King Fahd (1921 or 1923–2005), the fifth monarch of Saudi Arabia (13 June 1982 – 1 August 2005)
- Sultan bin Abdulaziz (1925–2011)
- Luluwah bint Abdulaziz (c. 1928–2008)
- Abdul Rahman bin Abdulaziz (1931–2017)
- Nayef bin Abdulaziz (1934–2012)
- Turki II bin Abdulaziz (1934–2016)
- King Salman (born 1935), seventh and incumbent monarch of Saudi Arabia (23 January 2015 – present)
- Ahmed bin Abdulaziz (born 1942)
- Latifa bint Abdulaziz (died 3 September 2024)
- Al Jawhara bint Abdulaziz (died 9 March 2023)
- Jawahir bint Abdulaziz (died June 2015)

Two of her daughters married Abdullah bin Abdul Rahman's sons, younger brother of King Abdulaziz. Al Jawhara bint Abdulaziz was Khalid bin Abdullah's spouse, and Jawahir bint Abdulaziz was Mohammed bin Abdullah's wife. Luluwah bint Abdulaziz is the mother of Abdullah bin Faisal bin Turki.

== Personal characteristics ==
In addition to being the mother of seven sons, Hussa bint Ahmed had personal characteristics that made her the most valued spouse of King Abdulaziz. Firstly, she was very beautiful and had charm and a strong personality. She was also influential, and attempted to instill a sense of group feeling among her sons. She raised all of her children in a political atmosphere and urged them to spend time together. In addition, she had effects on some decisions of King Abdulaziz. For instance, she urged him to make Prince Fahd a member of his advisory board. King Abdulaziz prayed that she would accompany him in the paradise.

Bandar bin Sultan describes his grandmother, Hussa, as a combination of Margaret Thatcher and Mother Teresa. He further states that she was a very religious yet strong willed woman.

=== Her familial relations ===
Hussa bint Ahmed is said to have organized daily dinner gatherings at her home for her sons and their families. She supported the idea of unity among her sons through these dinner gatherings. Her daughters are said to have continued her tradition of weekly dinner gatherings. Hussa bint Ahmed is reported to have been a demanding person in that she wanted to be visited daily by her sons when they were in Riyadh. She was also known for emphasizing discipline and a driving work ethic in her sons.

Hussa bint Ahmed raised Bandar bin Sultan, the future Saudi ambassador to the United States of America, who was her grandson and a son of Sultan bin Abdulaziz. When Prince Bandar was eleven, he and his mother went to live with her in the palace after the death of King Abdulaziz.

=== Further relations with Al Saud family ===
Hussa bint Ahmed's younger sisters married King Abdulaziz's sons. Muhdi bint Ahmed married Prince Nasser and was Turki bin Nasser's mother. Another sister, Sultana bint Ahmed, was King Faisal's first wife and Abdullah Al Faisal's mother.

== Death ==
Hussa bint Ahmed died in Riyadh in 1969 at the age of 69. Funeral prayers were performed for her in the Great Mosque in Riyadh after the noon prayer attended by King Faisal and Crown Prince Khalid as well as a large number of senior princes and his sons.
