= Mohammed bin Abdullah Al Saud =

Saudi royal and businessman (1943–2011)

- Born: 12 January 1943; Mecca
- Died: 21 August 2011 (aged 68)
- Burial: Al Adl cemetery, Mecca
- Spouse: Nouf bint Khalid (divorced); Noura bint Bandar
- Issue: List: Prince Turki Princess Noura Prince Khalid Prince Fahd Prince Talal Prince Saud Prince Sultan Princess Haifa
Names
- Mohammed bin Abdullah bin Faisal bin Abdulaziz bin Abdul Rahman bin Faisal
- House: Al Saud
- Father: Abdullah bin Faisal
- Mother: Al Jawhara bint Khalid bin Mohammed
- Education: University of Fribourg

Mohammed bin Abdullah Al Saud (Arabic: محمد بن عبد الله آل سعود; 12 January 1943 – 21 August 2011) was a Saudi royal who served as the chairman of Al Faisaliah Group and Al Ahly football club. He was a grandson of King Faisal and a son of Abdullah bin Faisal.

== Early life and education ==
Prince Mohammed was born in Mecca on 12 January 1943. He was the second child of Abdullah bin Faisal and Al Jawhara bint Khalid bin Mohammed bin Abdul Rahman. His maternal grandfather, Khalid, was a nephew of King Abdulaziz. Prince Mohammed had six full brothers, including Khalid.

Prince Mohammed completed his primary and secondary education in Taif. He attended a high school in Lausanne, and received a bachelor's degree in commerce and trade from the University of Fribourg in Switzerland in 1967.

== Career ==
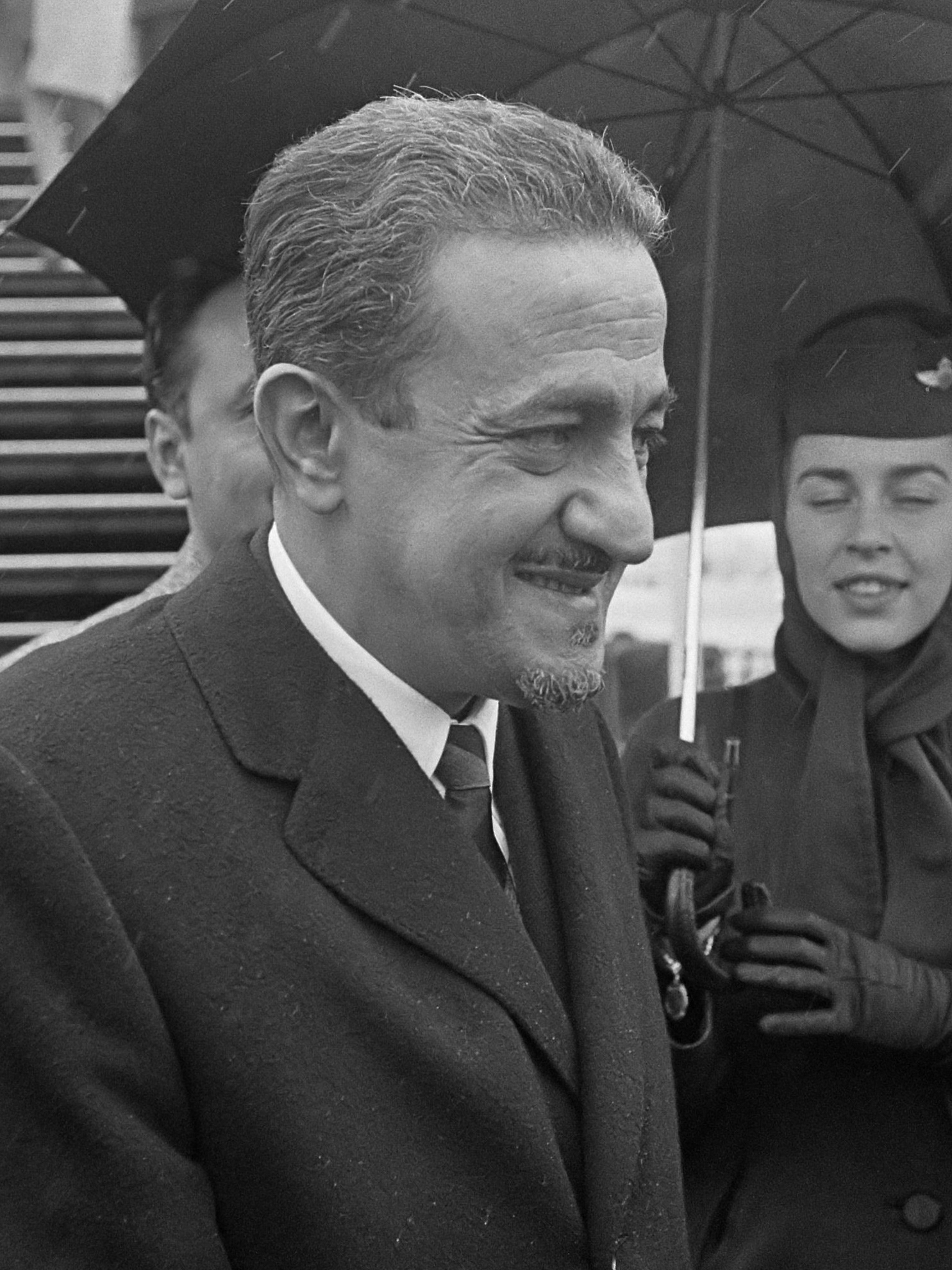
Prince Abdullah bin Faisal, Prince Mohammed's father

Prince Mohammed held various government positions at the Saudi Arabian Monetary Agency in Jeddah and at the Ministry of Education. First, he worked as an advisor in the monetary agency. In 1970 he was appointed director of overseas education at the ministry. He was the assistant deputy minister of education. He resigned from the office in 1983.

Then Prince Mohammed served as the director of Al Faisaliah Group founded by his father, in 1970. In January 2004 Prince Mohammed introduced Saudi businesswoman Lubna Olayan to the US President Bill Clinton at the Jeddah Economic Forum.

In addition, Prince Mohammed was the chairman of the board of directors of Al Takamul International Company for Commercial Investment, Qassim Cement Company and the National Takamul Foundation for Agriculture. He was the cofounder of the Arab Thought Foundation and a member of the board of trustees of King Faisal Foundation.

Prince Mohammed was also one of the presidents of Al Ahly football club.

=== Literary works and views ===
Like his father Prince Mohammed was a poet. He published several poetry books.

Prince Mohammed openly criticised the Saudi education system arguing that it produced terrorists in a television interview on Al Arabiya.

== Personal life and death ==
Mohammed bin Abdullah married twice. One of his spouses was Nouf bint Khalid, a daughter of King Khalid, and they divorced. Then, he married Noura bint Bandar, a daughter of Bandar bin Mohammed and Al Bandari bint Abdulaziz. Children of Prince Mohammed include Turki, Noura, Khalid, Fahd, Talal, Saud, Sultan and Haifa. In 2017 Turki bin Mohammed became the president of Al Ahly football club. His son, Saud, is a businessman and a member of the board of trustees of Arab Thought Foundation. He is married to Basma bint Abdullah, a daughter of King Abdullah who ruled Saudi Arabia from 2005 to 2015.

Prince Mohammed died at the age of 68 in the United States on 21 August 2011. His body was brought to Jeddah, and funeral prayers were performed at the Grand Mosque in Mecca on 24 August before he was buried in Al Adl cemetery, Mecca, where his parents had also been laid down.

== Legacy ==
Prince Mohammed bin Abdullah Al Faisal Stadium was named after him in October 2011. His family established a charitable foundation, Foundation of Emir Mohammed Al Abdullah Al Faisal bin Abdulaziz Al Saud.
