= Al Jawhara bint Abdulaziz Al Saud =

Saudi royal (died 2023)

- Died: 9 March 2023
- Spouse: Khalid bin Abdullah bin Abdul Rahman Al Saud
- Issue: List: Prince Fahd Princess Fadwa Prince Salman Prince Saud Prince Ahmad Princess Nuf Princess Fahda
Names
- Al Jawhara bint Abdulaziz bin Abdul Rahman Al Saud
- House: Al Saud
- Father: King Abdulaziz
- Mother: Hassa bint Ahmed Al Sudairi

Al Jawhara bint Abdulaziz Al Saud (Arabic: الجوهرة بنت عبد العزيز آل سعود; died 9 March 2023) was a member of the House of Saud. She was the sister of Saudi King Salman bin Abdulaziz.

Al Jawhara was the daughter of Hassa Al Sudairi of the Al Sudairi family, one of the most powerful families in Nejd. Her father was King Abdulaziz, the founder of the Kingdom of Saudi Arabia. She was one of the full-sisters of the Sudairi brothers, who have held high political offices along with their sons. Two of the Sudairi brothers succeeded their father as King of Saudi Arabia, King Fahd and King Salman. Princess Al Jawhara was particularly close to her brother Prince Sultan.

Al Jawhara bint Abdulaziz was married to her cousin Prince Khalid (1937–2021), a son of her father's half-brother Abdullah bin Abdul Rahman. Prince Khalid was a well-known owner and breeder of champion racehorses in the United States and the United Kingdom, and winner, at some stage, of almost every Classic race in England and France. Their daughter, Princess Nouf bint Khalid (1962–2021), was the spouse of the Prince Fahd bin Salman, the eldest son of King Salman.

Al Jawhara died on 9 March 2023. Funeral prayers for her were performed at the Imam Turki bin Abdullah Mosque in Riyadh on 10 March. Her nephew Crown Prince and Prime Minister Mohammed bin Salman led the funeral procession. Many dignitaries, including Egyptian President Abdel Fattah El-Sisi and Qatari ruler Tamim bin Hamad Al Thani, sent condolences to King Salman and Crown Prince Mohammed over the passing of Al Jawhara bint Abdulaziz.
