= Abdul Rahman bin Abdulaziz Al Saud =

Saudi royal and government official (1928–2017)

Deputy Minister of Defense and Aviation
- In office: 1978 – 5 November 2011
- Predecessor: Turki II bin Abdulaziz Al Saud
- Successor: Khalid bin Sultan
- Prime Minister: List: King Khalid; King Fahd; King Abdullah
- Born: 1928; Kingdom of Nejd and Hejaz
- Died: 13 July 2017 (aged 88–89)
- Burial: 15 July 2017; Al Adl cemetery, Mecca
- Spouse: Maha Al Ibrahim; Munira bint Turki bin Ahmed Al Sudairi
Names
- Abdul Rahman bin Abdulaziz bin Abdul Rahman bin Faisal Al Saud
- House: Al Saud
- Father: King Abdulaziz
- Mother: Hussa bint Ahmed Al Sudairi
- Education: University of California, Berkeley; California Military Academy

Abdul Rahman bin Abdulaziz Al Saud (Arabic: عبد الرحمن بن عبد العزيز آل سعود, ʿAbd ar Raḥman ibn ʿAbd al ʿAzīz Āl Suʿūd; 1928 – 13 July 2017) was a senior member of the House of Saud and Saudi Arabian deputy minister of defense and aviation. At the time of his death, he was the oldest living member of the Sudairi Seven.

== Early life and education ==
Abdul Rahman was born in 1928 as the sixteenth son of King Abdulaziz and third son of Hussa bint Ahmed Al Sudairi. He was the first of King Abdulaziz's sons to study in the West and received a bachelor's degree in economics and business administration from the University of California, Berkeley. He also graduated from the California Military Academy.

== Career ==
Prince Abdul Rahman was the counsellor for royal family affairs during the mid-1970s. He replaced his brother, Prince Turki, as the deputy minister of defense and aviation in 1978 when Turki resigned. Prince Abdul Rahman also involved in business activities.

During Prince Sultan’s absence from the Kingdom for medical treatment, he increased his activity at the ministry. Abdul Rahman was often described as becoming more irritable with age.

He was relieved from his post as deputy minister on 5 November 2011. According to Al-Quds Al-Arabi, he was dismissed by King Abdullah when, unhappy at being bypassed as crown prince in favor of Prince Nayef, he refused to declare allegiance to Nayef.

== Views and succession ==
Following the Gulf War, Prince Abdul Rahman, as deputy defense minister, objected to the request of Prince Khalid bin Sultan to be named as the chief of staff of the Saudi army.

== Personal life and death ==
Prince Abdul Rahman married Maha Al Ibrahim, sister of King Fahd's wife Al Jawhara Al Ibrahim and Al Ibrahim's brothers (including Waleed Al Ibrahim). Another wife was Munira bint Turki bin Ahmed Al Sudairi. His son-in-law is Nayef bin Fawwaz Al Sha'lan. One of Abdul Rahman's son, Mohammed, was named the deputy governor of Riyadh in 2017.

Abdul Rahman died on 13 July 2017 at the age of 89. Funeral prayers were performed at the Grand Mosque in Mecca on 15 July, and he was buried at Al Adl cemetery. One of his sons, Saud, died in November 2021, just a few years after Abdul Rahman.
