= Luluwah bint Abdulaziz Al Saud =

Saudi royal (1928–2008)

- Born: 1927
- Died: 17 September 2008 (aged 80–81)
- Burial: 18 September 2008; Mecca
- Spouse: Faisal bin Turki bin Abdullah bin Saud Al Saud
- Issue: 7, including Abdullah bin Faisal
Names
- Luluwah bint Abdulaziz bin Abdul Rahman bin Faisal Al Saud
- House: Al Saud
- Father: King Abdulaziz
- Mother: Hassa bint Ahmad Al Sudairi

Luluwah bint Abdulaziz Al Saud (Arabic: لؤلؤة بنت عبد العزيز آل سعود; 1927 – 17 September 2008) was a member of the House of Saud and a daughter of King Abdulaziz and Hassa bint Ahmad Al Sudairi.

== Early life ==
Luluwah bint Abdulaziz was born in 1927. Her parents were King Abdulaziz and Hassa bint Ahmad Al Sudairi. She was the full sister of the Sudairi Seven.

== Personal life ==
Princess Luluwah was married to her second cousin once removed, Faisal bin Turki bin Abdullah bin Saud Al Saud, a descendant of the 19th-century Saudi ruler Saud bin Faisal bin Turki, who was a brother of Princess Luluwah's grandfather Abdul Rahman bin Faisal. Princess Luluwah and Prince Faisal had seven children, four sons and three daughters, including Abdullah bin Faisal.

Luluwah's daughter Abeer is the spouse of Saud bin Nayef. Her other daughter, Al Jawhara, is married to Prince Sultan bin Fahd and the third, Nouf, is the wife of Abdul Rahman bin Abdullah Al Faisal. Luluwah's son, Mohammed bin Faisal, was an advisor at the Ministry of Foreign Affairs. Another son, Sultan, was an aviation officer and a businessman. He was killed in a car crash at age 41 on 23 July 2002 while coming from Jeddah to Riyadh to attend the funeral prayers for Prince Ahmed, son of Luluwah's brother Prince Salman bin Abdulaziz (later king). Princess Luluwah's son Khalid was named Saudi Arabia's ambassador to Jordan in October 2015.

== Death and legacy ==
Princess Luluwah died on 17 September 2008 at the age of 80. Her funeral prayers were performed by her half-brother King Abdullah, with the attendance of a number of senior royals and Saudi citizens, at the Grand Mosque in Mecca on 18 September 2008. One of her full brothers, Crown Prince Sultan, received condolences on her death at his palace in Al Khaldiah district in Jeddah on 18 and 19 September 2008.

In 2015 the Women's Committee at the Council of Saudi Chambers initiated the Princess Luluwah bint Abdulaziz Award to recognise successful women in the fields of family, business and young leaders.
