= Khalid bin Abdullah Al Saud (1937–2021) =

Saudi businessman and royal (1937–2021)

- Born: 1937; Ta'if, Saudi Arabia
- Died: January 2021 (aged 83–84)
- Spouse: Al Jawhara bint Abdulaziz Al Saud
- Issue: List: Prince Fahd Princess Fadwa Prince Salman Prince Saud Prince Ahmad Princess Nuf Princess Fahda
Names
- Khalid bin Abdullah bin Abdul Rahman bin Faisal bin Turki bin Abdullah
- House: Saud
- Father: Abdullah bin Abdul Rahman Al Saud
- Mother: Noura bint Fahd Al Muhanna Aba Al Khail

Khalid bin Abdullah Al Saud (Arabic: خالد بن عبدالله آل سعود Khalid bin ʿAbdullāh Āl Suʿūd; 1937 – January 2021) was a member of the House of Saud. He had extensive business interests, run through Mawarid Holding, but is probably best known as the owner of Juddmonte Farms. As such, he was one of the leading figures in the world of thoroughbred horseracing and the list of outstanding horses to have competed in his racing colours includes Arrogate, Dancing Brave, Enable, and Frankel.

== Early life ==
Prince Khalid was one of the sons of Abdullah bin Abdul Rahman, a younger half-brother of King Abdulaziz, the founder of Saudi Arabia. His mother was Noura bint Fahd Al Muhanna Aba Al Khail.

Prince Khalid was born in Ta'if in 1937. He studied history in the United States and Riyadh, and was employed for a time at the Ministry of Foreign Affairs. He then embarked on an extremely successful career in business, serving an apprenticeship under the guidance of Sulaiman Olayan.

== Business career ==
In October 1980 Khalid bin Abdullah and Suleiman Olayan bought stocks from First Chicago Corporation. They also had stocks of various American banks, including Mellon Bank, Pittsburgh; Western Bancorp, Los Angeles; Valley National Bank, Phoenix; Hawaii Bancorp, Honolulu; Southeast Bancorp, Miami; National City Bank, Cleveland and First Bank Systems, Minneapolis.

The main business vehicle of Khalid bin Abdullah was Mawarid Holding, one of Saudi Arabia's largest and most diversified private businesses, with extensive dealings in financial services, manufacturing, construction, medical supplies, catering, telecommunications and the media. A study of the commercial activities of members of the House of Saud published in 2001 listed 65 separate entities in which Prince Khalid held an interest. He was the owner of Orbit Communications Company, a privately owned Pay TV network operating in Bahrain. Until 8 February 2009 he served as chairman of the Saudi Chemical Company's board of directors and as chairman of Saudi Arabian Amiantit Company.

By the early 2000s responsibility for running his business had passed, in part, to Prince Khalid's four sons.

In 1990, Prince Khalid's wealth was estimated by Fortune magazine at $1.0 billion.

== Horseracing career ==
=== Development ===
Although Prince Khalid's father had owned horses, he had not kept them for racing. Prince Khalid's introduction to the sport came on a trip to Longchamp with friends in 1956. Even so, he did not start owning race horses himself until the late 1970s. Prince Khalid's purchases of yearlings at that time heralded the start of the largescale investment in horseracing by owners from the Middle East that was to transform the sport.

In 1977 Prince Khalid's first racing adviser, the former trainer Humphrey Cottrill, bought for him four yearlings at the Newmarket sales. The following year Prince Khalid bought the top two lots in the Houghton Sales at Newmarket, although the top-priced yearling, Sand Hawk, for whom he paid a record 264,000 guineas, proved largely a disappointment; as would Convention, for whom he paid 1.4 million guineas in 1983. However, Cottrill and the trainer Jeremy Tree had also paid $225,000 for a dark bay colt by In Reality at the Keeneland Sales of 1978, their single purchase, who as Known Fact won the Middle Park Stakes in the autumn of 1979 and then, after Nureyev's disqualification, the 2,000 Guineas of 1980, following up his victory with a win in the Queen Elizabeth II Stakes.

Known Fact's victory in the 2,000 Guineas was not only Prince Abdullah's first victory in an English Classic race but also the first by any Arab owner. His first winner of any kind had come the previous season, when Charming Native came home first at Windsor, while Abeer had provided his first victory at Royal Ascot with her win in the Queen Mary Stakes.

=== Success ===
Khalid bin Abdullah's racing colours.

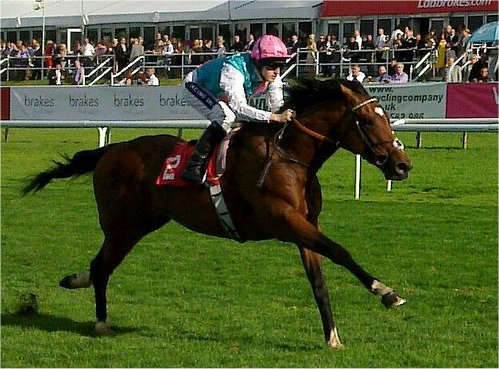
Frankel

Prince Khalid's colours, of green silks with white sleeves and a pink sash and cap, soon became a regular feature of the winner's enclosure in all the Classic races of the world. In 1985, Rainbow Quest won the Prix de l'Arc de Triomphe. The following year, Dancing Brave repeated that success and also won the 2,000 Guineas and the King George VI and Queen Elizabeth Stakes. Furthermore, Dancing Brave failed only narrowly to add a victory in the Derby to this remarkable season.

In 1982 Prince Khalid had his first homebred winner with Fine Edge at Newmarket. His Juddmonte breeding operation soon produced Warning, by Known Fact out of the broodmare Slightly Dangerous, who became Europe's Champion Miler in the 1988 season. Remarkably, Prince Khalid went on to win all five British Classic races with homebred horses: Quest For Fame, sired by Rainbow Quest, won Juddmonte's first Epsom Derby in 1990, followed by Commander In Chief (a son of Dancing Brave) in 1993, and finally the fourth-generation Juddmonte-bred Workforce, who broke the course record at Epsom with the victory in 2010. Toulon won the St Leger of 1991 and Zafonic carried off the 2,000 Guineas two years later, as did Frankel in 2011. Reams of Verse won The Oaks in 1997 and Enable won The Oaks in 2017. Wince won the 1,000 Guineas in 1999, followed by Special Duty's victory in the same race in 2010.

The winner of not just the 2,000 Guineas, but also of multiple Group One races, including the Juddmonte-sponsored International Stakes at York, Frankel was bred by Prince Khalid through three generations via his mare Kind. He is named after Bobby Frankel, who had trained Prince Khalid's horses in America. Many regard him to be one of the greatest racehorses of all time.

Juddmonte also bred a clean sweep of French Classic winners. Sanglamore won the Prix du Jockey Club in 1990 and New Bay won it in 2015, whilst Houseproud, Zenda and Special Duty won the Poule d'Essai des Pouliches in 1990, 2002 and 2010. Jolypha and Nebraska Tornado won the Prix de Diane, in 1992 and 2003 respectively, and Raintrap and Sunshack were the winners of the Prix Royal-Oak in 1993 and 1995, before American Post took the Poule d'Essai des Poulains in 2004. Finally, there was victory for Rail Link in the Prix de l'Arc de Triomphe of 2006, a success repeated by Workforce in 2010 (making this horse only the sixth horse in history to win both the Derby and the Arc) and Enable in 2017 and 2018.

In Ireland, the list of Juddmonte-bred successes includes Irish Oaks winners Wemyss Bight and Bolas in 1993 and 1994 and Irish 2,000 Guineas winner Kingman in 2014. In North America, the winning horses include Empire Maker, winner of the Belmont Stakes of 2003 and Flute, the Kentucky Oaks winner in 2003. Juddmonte-purchased Arrogate, winner of four Grade One races including the Dubai World Cup, was crowned Longines World's Best Horse for 2017. Eclipse Award champion mares include Ryafan in 1997, Banks Hill in 2001 and Intercontinental in 2005. The last two of these both won the Breeders' Cup Filly & Mare Turf, which was also won in 2009 by Midday, a three-time winner of the Nassau Stakes at Goodwood.

At the Breeders' Cup in 2018, homebreds Enable and Expert Eye won the Breeders' Cup Turf and Breeders' Cup Mile respectively.

=== Recognition ===
In North America, Prince Khalid was the recipient of an Eclipse Award as Top Owner in 1992, 2003, 2016 and 2017, and received five awards as the Top Breeder: in 1995, 2001, 2002, 2003 and 2009. In 2003, Prince Khalid finished third in the American owners' championship.

In Europe, Prince Khalid's 78 winners in Britain and 58 winners in France made him the champion owner in both those countries in 2003, and he was British flat racing's champion owner again in 2010, with 74 winners and prize money of more than £3 million. He took the British title once more in 2011, when he had 63 winners and won more than £3.4 million in prize money.

In 1983 he was made an honorary member of The Jockey Club. In 2023, he was posthumously inducted into the QIPCO British Champions Series Hall of Fame as a 'Special Contributor'.

=== Trainers ===
Prince Khalid's horses were initially trained mainly by Jeremy Tree, to whom he was introduced by Humphrey Cottrill, and by Guy Harwood, who trained Dancing Brave. The circle of European trainers widened to include Henry Cecil, Barry Hills and Criquette Head-Maarek, and now comprises André Fabre, Francis-Henri Graffard and Henri-François Devin in France, Dermot Weld and Ger Lyons in Ireland and John and Thady Gosden, Sir Michael Stoute, Hugo Palmer, Roger Charlton, Charlie Hills, and Ralph Beckett in England. In the US, his horses were for a long time in the care of Bobby Frankel and are now with Bill Mott, Bob Baffert, Brad Cox and Chad Brown.

=== Juddmonte Farms ===
In 1982, Khalid bin Abdullah purchased Cayton Park Stud at Wargrave in Berkshire, renaming it Juddmonte Farms. That property was sold in 2017. From the early 1980s he built up a collection of carefully selected mares, in the early days buying from Robert Sangster. By 2011 these represented, according to Lord Grimthorpe in an interview given to the Financial Times, "one of the greatest brood-mare bands in the history of breeding".

The British arm of the Juddmonte operations came to include Estcourt Estate in Gloucestershire, as well as Juddmonte Dullingham, Side Hill Stud and Banstead Manor Stud in Newmarket in Suffolk. There, Prince Khalid stood a number of leading stallions, notably Dansili, Oasis Dream, Frankel and Kingman (current).

Juddmonte also owns Ferrans Stud and New Abbey Stud in Ireland, as well as Juddmonte Farm in Lexington, Kentucky.

The Juddmonte Group's CEO is Douglas Erskine Crum. The studs in England are managed by Simon Mockridge, in Ireland by Barry Mahon (also European Racing Manager) and in the US by Garrett O'Rourke.

Prince Khalid was responsible for the allocation of horses to trainers and for approval of mating lists. In a rare interview in 2010 he told The Racing Post: "When I was at the sales I realised that it would be easier to buy horses and race them, but I got the feeling that this was not enough, that it would be more fun to do what people like the Aga Khan and Lord Howard de Walden did and build up your own families." He said that he had his stud book with him all the time.

In 2017, the Juddmonte operation employed around 250 people and extended to 700-800 horses around the world, with a racing stock of about 250.

== Personal life and death ==
Prince Khalid was married to his cousin Al Jawhara bint Abdulaziz, daughter of King Abdulaziz and Hassa bint Ahmed Al Sudairi. They had four sons and three daughters. Prince Khalid's daughter Nuf married Prince Fahd, son of King Salman. She died on 20 July 2021. Another daughter, Fadwa bint Khalid, is married to Mohammad bin Nawwaf, former Saudi ambassador to the United Kingdom.

Prince Khalid was one of the closest friends of King Fahd, his brother-in-law. He was widely reported to be studiously courteous and personally unassuming.

His son, Saud, serves as deputy chairman of the board of directors of Al Mawarid Holding and as vice chairman of the board of directors of the Orbit Satellite Television and Radio Network.

Prince Khalid died on 12 January 2021.

== Homes ==
Prince Khalid had homes in Saudi Arabia and overseas, close to his various stables or to the Classic racecourses. In the United States, he had a home in Kentucky, in Europe, a townhouse in France, on the Parc Monceau in Paris, an estate at Lake Mondsee in Austria, and in the United Kingdom, houses in London, Newmarket, Gloucestershire where he owned Estcourt Park, Long Newnton and Kent where he owned the 1,000-acre Fairlawne Estate, adjoining Plaxtol, near Shipbourne. He has also owned Newabbey House in Kildare since 1990.
