= Bandar bin Muhammad Al Saud =

Saudi prince and businessman (1924–2020)

- Born: 1924
- Died: 21 January 2020 (aged 95–96); Riyadh, Saudi Arabia
- Spouse: Al Bandari bint Abdulaziz Al Saud; Mamiya bint Al Shazli Al Hanin
- Issue: List: Princess Fahda Princess Al Jawhara Prince Saud Princess Mudhi Princess Noura Prince Muhammad Princess May Prince Mutaib Prince Turki Prince Fahd Princess Nouf Prince Salman Princess Noor Prince Sultan
- Bandar bin Muhammad bin Abdul Rahman Al Saud
- House: Al Saud
- Father: Muhammad bin Abdul Rahman Al Saud
- Mother: Munira bint Abdullah Al Sheikh

Bandar bin Muhammad Al Saud (Arabic: بندر بن محمد بن عبد الرحمن آل سعود) (1924– 21 January 2020), was a Saudi prince and businessman. He was a son of Prince Muhammad bin Abdul Rahman, a grandson of Abdul Rahman bin Faisal, Emir of Nejd, and a nephew of King Abdulaziz.

== Biography ==
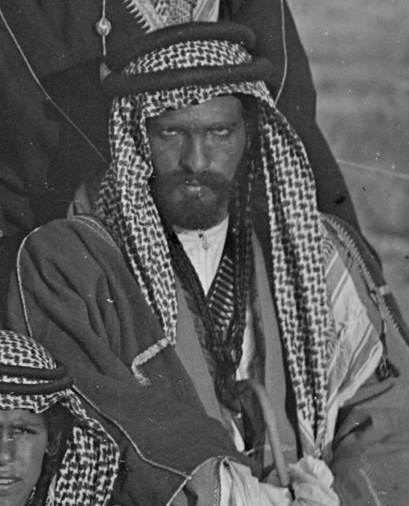
Muhammad bin Abdul Rahman, Prince Bandar's father

Bandar bin Muhammad was the twenty-first child of Muhammad bin Abdul Rahman, younger half-brother of King Abdulaziz. His mother was Munira bint Abdullah who was from the Al Sheikh family and was the sister of Tarfa bint Abdullah Al Sheikh, mother of King Faisal. This made Prince Bandar a maternal and paternal cousin of King Faisal. Prince Bandar married his cousin Princess Al Bandari, the daughter of King Abdulaziz. They had eleven children, six sons and five daughters. One of their daughters, Noura, married Mohammed bin Abdullah Al Saud.

Prince Bandar's second wife is a Tunisian businesswoman, Mamiya bint Al Shazli Al Hanin. They had four children, two sons and two daughters.

Prince Bandar was a businessman and the owner-designate of Bangladeshi Rupali Bank. He was also the owner of Alraed Ltd Investment Holding Company WLL. He was one of the founders of the Dar Al Maal Al Islami Trust which was initiated by Mohammed bin Faisal Al Saud, King Faisal's son, in 1981.

Prince Bandar was one of the members of Al Saud Family Council which was established by then Crown Prince Abdullah in June 2000 to discuss private issues, including business activities of princes and marriages of princesses to nonroyals. The Royal Court announced Bandar's death on 21 January 2020 at the age of 95, and his funeral was held the same day at Imam Turki bin Abdullah Mosque in Riyadh.
