= DMI Trust =

Dar al-Maal al-Islami دار المال الإسلامي
- Company type: Private
- Industry: Islamic banking
- Founded: 1981
- Headquarters: Switzerland
- Key people: Abdulkarim Khaled Yusuf Abdulla
- Revenue: over $3.6 billion USD
- Number of employees: over 1,400 in three continents
- Website: www.dmitrust.com

Dar al-Maal al-Islami Trust (Arabic: دار المال الإسلامي) ("The House of Islamic Money"), founded in Switzerland in 1981, is a leading Islamic financial institution with affiliates on four continents and assets under management of over US$3.6 billion, operating in accordance with Zakat principles of Islamic banking.

== Overview ==
DMI Trust was cofounded by a group of leading figures in 1981, including Mohammed bin Faisal Al Saud, Zayed bin Sultan Al Nahyan, Isa bin Salman Al Khalifa and Abdullah bin Faisal Al Saud. It has two main business units, Takafol and Retakafol, for Islamic banking and Islamic insurance/reinsurance respectively; these are based in the Bahamas, Luxembourg, and the United Kingdom. Fund management and financial services in Switzerland and Morocco, investment banking in Bahrain and Pakistan, commercial and retail banking in the Persian Gulf region and other parts of the world. Additionally, DMI Trust operates the Faisal Islamic Bank group of investment companies with affiliates in Bahrain, Egypt, Pakistan, Qatar and the United Arab Emirates.

== Notable personnel ==
- Prince Mohammed bin Faisal Al Saud – founder and chairman after 1983
- Omar A. Ali – CEO from 1986 to 1999
