= Muhammad bin Abdul Rahman Al Saud =

Saudi royal, soldier, and politician (1877–1943)

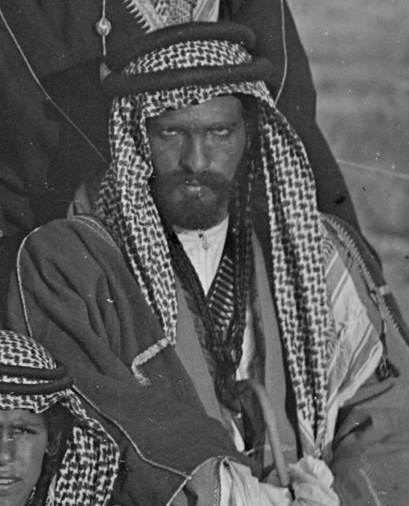
- Photo by Captain William Shakespear, 1911
- Born: c. 1877; Riyadh, Nejd
- Died: 25 July 1943 (aged 65–66); Riyadh, Saudi Arabia
- Burial: Al Oud cemetery, Riyadh
- Spouse: See list: Hussa bint Ahmed Al Sudairi; Munira bint Abdullah Al Sheikh; A daughter of Sultan bin Bajad Al Otaibi; A daughter of Abdullah bin Hasan Al Sheikh
- Issue: See list: Prince Khalid; Prince Fahd; Prince Abdullah; Prince Bandar; 8 other sons; 13 daughters
Names
- Muhammad bin Abdul Rahman bin Faisal
- House: Al Saud
- Father: Abdul Rahman bin Faisal, Emir of Nejd
- Mother: Sara bint Jiluwi bin Turki
- Occupation: Military officer • politician
- Military career
- Branch: Saudi Arabian Army
- Service years: 1901–1921
- Conflicts: Unification of Saudi Arabia

Muhammad bin Abdul Rahman Al Saud (Arabic: محمد بن عبد الرحمن آل سعود Muḥammad bin ʿAbd ar Raḥman Āl Suʿūd; c. 1877 – 25 July 1943) was an Arab soldier and politician who played a role in the conquests of his half-brother Abdulaziz that led to the formation of the Kingdom of Saudi Arabia.

Muhammad was the son of the last emir of Nejd, Abdul Rahman bin Faisal, and Sara bint Jiluwi, both from the House of Saud. Muhammad was an early supporter of his half-brother, King Abdulaziz, but they had a falling-out after both attempted to place their sons in line for kingship. This conflict may have led to the death of Muhammad's son Khalid in 1938. Muhammad later became a virtual non-entity in Saudi politics and died in Riyadh in 1943.

== Early life ==
Muhammad bin Abdul Rahman was the son of Abdul Rahman bin Faisal, twice Emir of Nejd, and his cousin Sara bint Jiluwi. His paternal grandfather was Emir Faisal bin Turki, and his maternal grandfather was Emir Faisal's brother Jiluwi bin Turki. He had a number of half-siblings from his father's other marriages; his half-brother Abdulaziz would become the king of Saudi Arabia, while his half-brothers Abdullah, Ahmed, and Musaid would have a role in the Saudi government. Muhammad was said to be particularly close to his half-brother Abdulaziz and his half-sisters Noura and Al Jawhara. Muhammad and Abdulaziz were fond of their sister Noura, and both men were known to say, "I am the brother of Noura."

There is some controversy regarding Muhammad's date of birth, with some sources making him older than Abdulaziz, an important factor in his later maneuvering for the succession. In a publication by his family his birth year is given as 1877. It is also stated that he was born in Riyadh and was younger than Abdulaziz. After his father lost power in 1891, the family went into exile in Kuwait.

== Activities and career ==
Muhammad accompanied his brother Abdulaziz on the latter's raid from November 1901 to January 1902, which resulted in Abdulaziz retaking the Masmak Castle and regaining control over Riyadh. Muhammad and his cousin Saud Al Kabeer bin Abdulaziz led the forces which helped Abdulaziz in the battle of Kanzan in 1915. In that battle the Al Ajman tribe wounded Abdulaziz and killed Muhammad's younger half-brother Saad bin Abdul Rahman. The Al Ajman then surrounded Abdulaziz's forces for almost six months before Abdulaziz managed to escape from them with the assistance of Muhammad and Saud Al Kabeer. In 1917 Muhammad went to Hajj being the first Al Saud member who made the pilgrimage after the establishment of the Kingdom of Hejaz in 1916. He headed a group of 12,500 Najdi, and 7,000 of them were armed. In 1920 Muhammad and his nephew Prince Saud, eldest surviving son of Abdulaziz, were sent to capture the Hail Province. Next year Muhammad also accompanied Prince Saud against the Al Rashidi forces.

After Abdulaziz took control over most of Arabia and proclaimed himself king, Muhammad was appointed governor of Mecca. He aspired to gain a much more powerful position in the government for himself and his son Khalid. To achieve his goals Muhammad attempted to eliminate Prince Saud, son of King Abdulaziz, in 1927 and in 1930, but both attempts were unsuccessful. When Saud was made crown prince in May 1933, King Abdulaziz asked the members of the Al Saud to pledge allegiance to Saud. Muhammad did not declare his allegiance and left Riyadh and settled in Mecca. However, his son Khalid attended the ceremony to pledge allegiance to Saud.

Prince Muhammad and other senior family members met with King Abdulaziz upon the latter's request in late December 1934 to reaffirm their allegiance to Crown Prince Saud. However, Muhammad and his brothers Abdullah and Ahmed told the king that their allegiance to him was still active, but they did not renew their allegiance to the crown prince. Then they sent a letter to King Abdulaziz explaining the reasons for their views about Crown Prince Saud.

== Personal life and death ==
One of the early palaces following the establishment of the Kingdom was built by Muhammad bin Abdul Rahman outside the walls of Riyadh which is called Atiqah Palace or Qaṣr 'Atīqa.

Muhammad married many times. One of his wives was Hussa bint Ahmed Al Sudairi, who King Abdulaziz married twice and who later became the mother of the Sudairi Seven. Muhammad had a son, Abdullah bin Muhammad, with Hussa.

When King Abdulaziz first married Hussa bint Ahmed in 1913, she was thirteen-years-old. They divorced after a few years, but remarried in 1919. It was the period between their first and second marriages that Hussa bint Ahmed married King Abdulaziz’s younger half brother, Muhammad. It is assumed that King Abdulaziz remained in love with Hussa bint Ahmed, and therefore, forced his half-brother to divorce her so that he could remarry her. Hussa bint Ahmed remained married with King Abdulaziz until the latter's death in 1953.

Another spouse of Muhammad bin Abdul Rahman was Munira bint Abdullah Al Shaikh, who was the sister of Tarfa bint Abdullah, mother of King Faisal. Muhammad also married a daughter of Sultan bin Bajad Al Otaibi who was from a leading family in the Ghut Ghut branch of the Otaibi tribe and one of the rebellious Ikhwan leaders. Following his settlement in Mecca in 1935 Muhammad, married a daughter of Abdullah bin Hasan Al Sheikh, chief qadi of the country.

Muhammad had twenty-five children: twelve sons and thirteen daughters. His eldest son, Khalid, married King Faisal's only full sister, Noura, in 1934. He was killed in a car crash on the Al Dahna to Kuwait road. One of Khalid's daughters, Al Jawhara, married Abdullah bin Faisal, the eldest son of King Faisal.

Muhammad's second eldest son was Fahd (1904–?) who married King Abdulaziz's daughter Sheikha and was the governor of Al Qassim Province who was appointed to the post on 29 June 1969. One of Fahd's daughters is Al Jawhara who is a member of the Consultative Council. Muhammad's grandson Fahd bin Abdullah bin Muhammad was deputy defence minister.

One of Muhammad's great-grandsons, Khalid bin Saud bin Khalid, was a high-ranking official at the ministry of foreign affairs. The daughter of Khalid bin Saud is married to Saud bin Khalid, son of Khalid bin Faisal, governor of Mecca Province. Other great-grandchildren of Muhammad are directors of the King Faisal Foundation. For instance, as of 2012 Bandar bin Saud bin Khalid Al Saud was the deputy managing director of the foundation.

Muhammad bin Abdul Rahman died in Riyadh on 25 July 1943 and was buried in Al Oud cemetery there.
