= Al Bandari bint Abdulaziz Al Saud =

Saudi royal (1928–2008)

- Born: 1928
- Died: 8 May 2008 (aged 79–80); King Faisal Specialist Hospital, Riyadh, Saudi Arabia
- Spouse: Bandar bin Muhammad Al Saud
- Issue: List: Princess Fahda Princess Al Jawhara Prince Saud Princess Mudhi Princess Noura Prince Muhammad Princess May Prince Mutaib Prince Turki Prince Fahd
Names
- Al Bandari bint Abdulaziz bin Abdul Rahman Al Saud
- House: Al Saud
- Father: King Abdulaziz
- Mother: Jawhara bint Sa'ad bin Abdul Muhsin Al Sudairi

Al Bandari bint Abdulaziz Al Saud (Arabic: البندري بنت عبد العزيز آل سعود; 1928 – 8 May 2008) was a daughter of King Abdulaziz of Saudi Arabia.

== Early life ==
Al Bandari was born in 1928. She was the daughter of King Abdulaziz and Jawhara bint Sa'ad bin Abdul Muhsin Al Sudairi. Her mother had been married to Sa'ad bin Abdul Rahman, the brother of King Abdulaziz. After Sa'ad's death in the battle of Kanzan in 1915, Abdulaziz married her and had four children with her, Al Bandari, Saad, Abdul Muhsin and Musa'id.

== Personal life ==
Al Bandari was married to Bandar bin Muhammad bin Abdul Rahman Al Saud, the owner designate of the Rupali Bank. One of their daughters, Noura, was the spouse of Mohammed bin Abdullah bin Faisal.

In August 1984 Al Bandari had a skin surgery in New York City which was performed by dermatologist Joseph Eller.

== Death ==
Al Bandari died on 8 May 2008 at the age of 80 at the King Faisal Specialist Hospital in Riyadh. Her funeral was held at the city's Imam Turki bin Abdullah Mosque. Messages of condolences were sent from throughout the Middle East to King Abdullah and the Saudi royal family. Condolences came from Sabah Al-Ahmad Al-Jaber Al-Sabah, the Emir of Kuwait, Sultan Qaboos of Oman, King Hamad of Bahrain, Emir Hamad bin Khalifa of Qatar and his son Sheikh Tamim bin Hamad.
