= Abdullah bin Abdul Rahman Al Saud =

Saudi royal, statesman, and soldier (1893–1976)

- Born: 1893
- Died: 4 December 1976 (aged 82–83)
- Issue: List: Yazid; Abdul Rahman; Muhammad; Khalid; Fahd; Sa'd; Saud; Bandar; Turki; Bader; Ahmad; Sultan; Mansour; Musab; Abdulaziz; Salman; Fawwaz; Abdul Muhsin; Thirteen daughters
Names
- Abdullah bin Abdul Rahman bin Faisal
- House: Al Saud
- Father: Abdul Rahman bin Faisal, Emir of Nejd

Abdullah bin Abdul Rahman Al Saud (Arabic: عبد الله بن عبد الرحمن آل سعود ʿAbd Allāh bin ʿAbd ar Raḥman Āl Suʿūd; 1893 – 4 December 1976) was a Saudi Arabian statesman, soldier, and royal counsellor. He was a prominent advisor and member of the inner council of his elder half-brother, King Abdulaziz. After Abdulaziz died in 1953, Prince Abdullah continued to be involved in state affairs during the reigns of his nephews Saud, Faisal, and Khalid. He died in 1976.

== Early life ==
Abdullah bin Abdul Rahman was born in 1893. He was the seventh son of Abdul Rahman bin Faisal, Emir of Nejd, and one of the grandsons of Emir Faisal bin Turki. He had a number of half-siblings on his father's side; his half-brother Abdulaziz would become the king of Saudi Arabia, while his half-brothers Muhammad, Ahmed, and Musaid would all play an important role in the Saudi government.

== Career ==
Abdullah bin Abdul Rahman was prominent in the military campaigns of his elder half-brother Abdulaziz as he laid the foundations of the future state of Saudi Arabia. He led the Saudi forces in the capture of Hijaz in 1924. He was responsible for the capture and destruction of the Ikhwan centre of Ghat Ghat during the Ikhwan Revolt of 1929. He became a frequent participant in the political committee formed by the King in 1932 following the establishment of Saudi Arabia. Prince Abdullah and other senior family members met with King Abdulaziz upon the latter's request in late December 1934 to reaffirm their allegiance to Crown Prince Saud who had been appointed to the post in May 1933. However, Abdullah and his half-brothers Muhammad and Ahmed told the king that their allegiance to him was still active, but they did not renew their allegiance to the crown prince. Then they sent a letter to King Abdulaziz explaining the reasons for their views about Crown Prince Saud.

However, Abdullah continued to be the key counsellor of the King, a member of the privy council, and one of the king's official advisors until the King's death in 1953. He was a participant at the meeting with the British prime minister Winston Churchill in 1945, and was given a left-hand drive Rolls-Royce. He also accompanied King Abdulaziz to the meeting with U.S. president Franklin D. Roosevelt on 14 February 1945.

Abdullah was part of the council of ministers with the title of chief advisor to King Saud. During the rivalry between King Saud and Crown Prince Faisal, Abdullah first supported the former in 1960. However, from 1961 he endorsed the actions of the latter, facilitating Faisal's attempts to be successful. Upon Prince Abdullah's endorsement of Crown Prince Faisal, King Saud reduced his allowance in April 1961.

On 6 January 1965 Prince Abdullah accompanied Saud in the latter's declaration of allegiance to King Faisal. At the beginning of King Faisal's reign, Prince Abdullah became a member of the council which had been established by him to guide the succession issues.

Abdullah bin Abdul Rahman was among five senior princes who met immediately after the assassination of King Faisal and proclaimed then Crown Prince Khalid the king of Saudi Arabia.

== Views, personal life and death ==
Abdullah bin Abdul Rahman was conservative, and opposed some new policies of King Faisal, including reduction of financial support to tribal leaders, religious figures and older members of the royal family as well as educational reforms.

Noura bint Fahd Al Muhanna Aba Al Khail was one of his spouses and the mother of Khalid bin Abdullah. His son, Abdul Rahman, was one of the members of Al Saud Family Council which was established in June 2000 by Crown Prince Abdullah to discuss private issues, including business activities of princes and marriages of princesses to non-royals. Abdul Rahman bin Abdullah married Noura bint Musaid, who was the daughter of his uncle Prince Musaid and died in July 2016.

Abdullah bin Abdul Rahman's son, Khalid bin Abdullah, married Al Jawhara bint Abdulaziz, full sister of the Sudairi Seven. One of his daughters, Jawhara bint Abdullah, married Saud bin Faisal, former foreign affairs minister of Saudi Arabia. Another, Noura, was the spouse of Turki bin Abdulaziz, her cousin.

Abdullah bin Abdul Rahman died on 4 December 1976.
