= Sudairi Seven =

Alliance of seven Saudi royal siblings

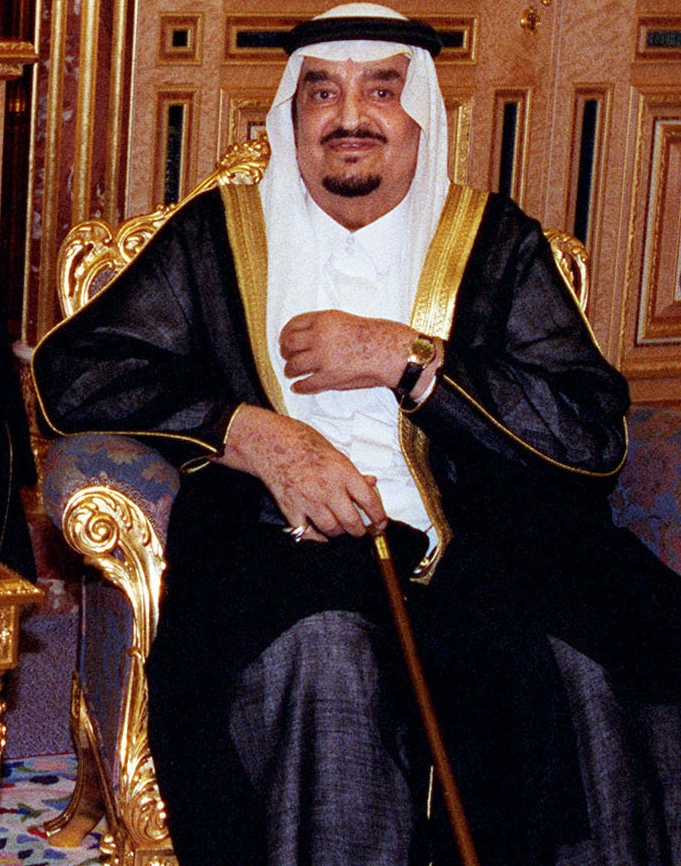
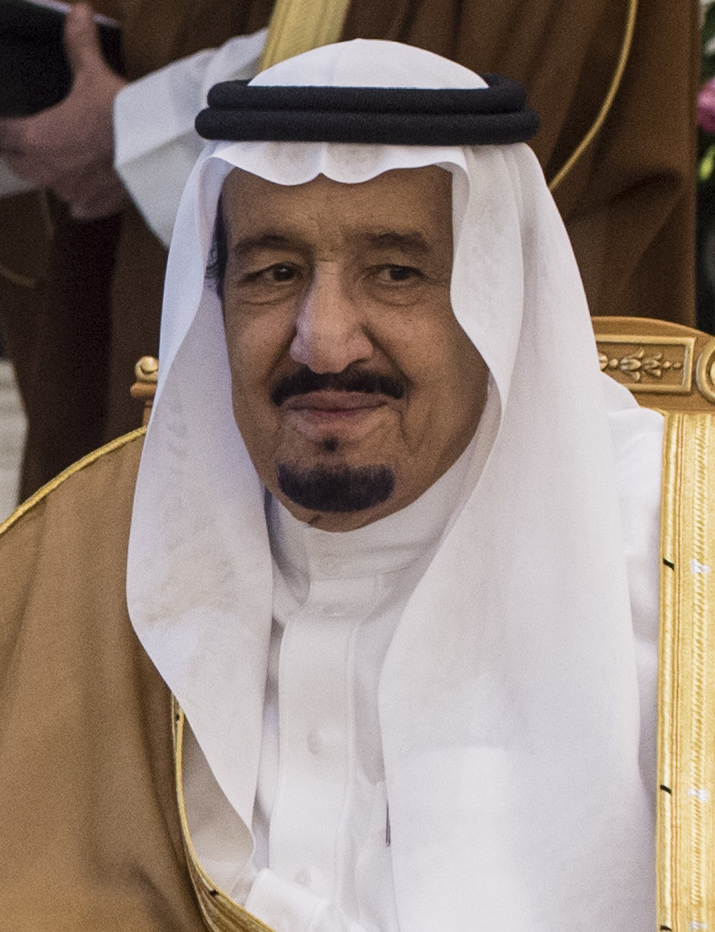
The eldest of the Sudairi Seven, Fahd (top), and the sixth, Salman, served as King of Saudi Arabia.

The Sudairi Seven (Arabic: السديريون السبعة, As Sudayriyyūn as Sabʿah), also spelled Sudairy or Sudayri, is the commonly used name for a powerful alliance of seven full brothers within the Saudi royal family. They are also sometimes referred to as the Sudairi clan (Arabic: عائلة السديري ʿĀʾilat as-Sudayrī) or the Sudairi faction. They are among the forty-five sons of the country's founder, King Abdulaziz. The King had more sons with their mother, Hussa bint Ahmed Al Sudairi, than he did with any of his other wives.

The oldest of the Sudairi Seven (Fahd) served as King of Saudi Arabia from 1982 to 2005; the second- and fourth-oldest (Sultan and Nayef) served as Crown Prince of Saudi Arabia, but predeceased King Abdullah; and the sixth-oldest (Salman) succeeded Abdullah as king in 2015. One of the Sudairi Seven, Prince Turki, had broken off with his brothers in 1978. Following the death of Prince Abdul Rahman in 2017 only the two youngest of the Seven (Salman and Ahmed) survive, with the youngest brother, Prince Ahmed, under house arrest by order of King Salman.

== Origins and composition ==
In the early twentieth century, King Abdulaziz rapidly expanded his power base in Nejd to establish the Kingdom of Saudi Arabia in 1932, and became its first king. As part of this process of expansion, he married women from powerful Nejdi and other Arab families to cement his control over all parts of his new domain. It is believed he married as many as 22 women as a result. One of these marriages was to Hussa bint Ahmed Al Sudairi, a member of the powerful Al Sudairi clan to which King Abdulaziz's mother, Sara bint Ahmed Al Sudairi, belonged.

The number of children that King Abdulaziz fathered in total, with all his wives, is unknown. One source indicates that he had 37 sons. The Sudairi Seven – the seven sons of King Abdulaziz and Hassa bint Ahmed – were the largest bloc of full brothers and as a consequence, were able to wield a degree of coordinated influence and power. King Abdulaziz and Hassa bint Ahmed married twice; their first marriage started in 1913 and may have produced a son, Prince Sa'ad (1914–19). Hassa then married Muhammad bin Abdul Rahman, the half-brother of King Abdulaziz, with whom she had a son, Prince Abdullah, the father of Fahd bin Abdullah bin Mohammed Al Saud. Hassa and King Abdulaziz married again in 1920, and their second marriage produced seven sons and four daughters.

== The Seven ==
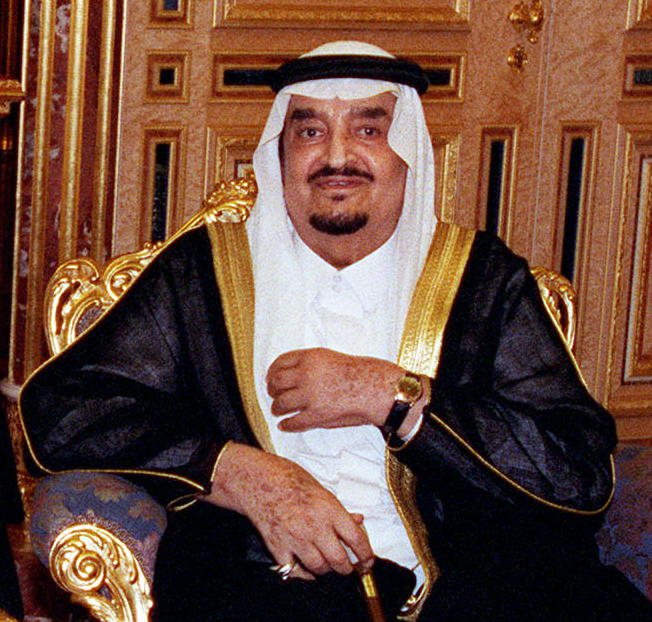
Fahd
(1921–2005)
- King of Saudi Arabia
  (1982–2005)
- Crown Prince
  (1975–82)
- 2nd Deputy Prime Minister
  (1967–75)
- Minister of the Interior
  (1963–75)

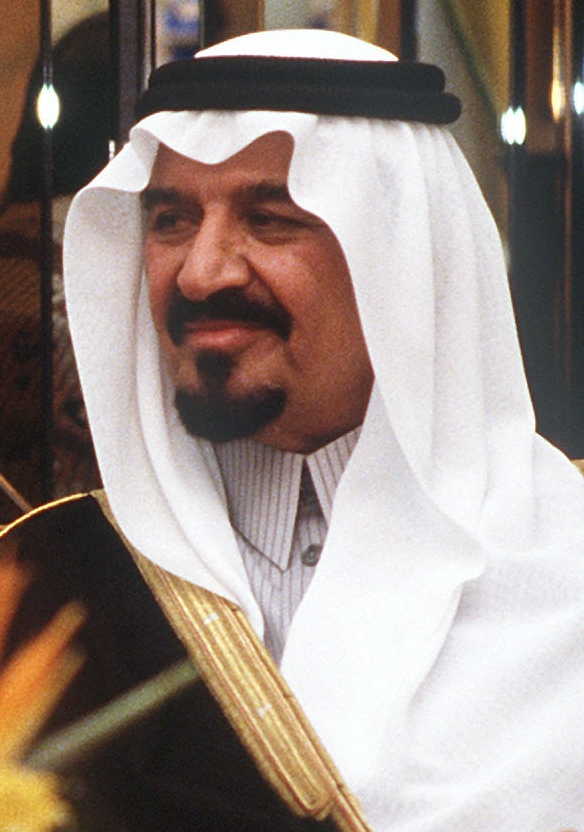
Sultan
(1925–2011)
- Crown Prince
  (2005–2011)
- 2nd Deputy Prime Minister
  (1982–2005)
- Defense Minister
  (1962–2011)

Abdul Rahman (1928–2017)
- Removed from succession
- Deputy Defense Minister
  (1978–2011)

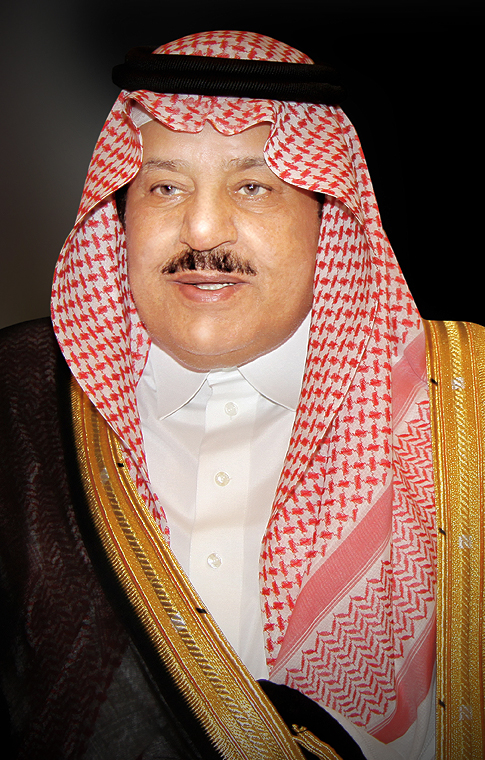
Nayef
(1933–2012)
- Crown Prince and First Deputy Prime Minister
  (2011–2012)
- Interior Minister
  (1975–2012)

Turki II
(1934–2016)
- Removed from succession
- Deputy Defense Minister
  (1968–78)

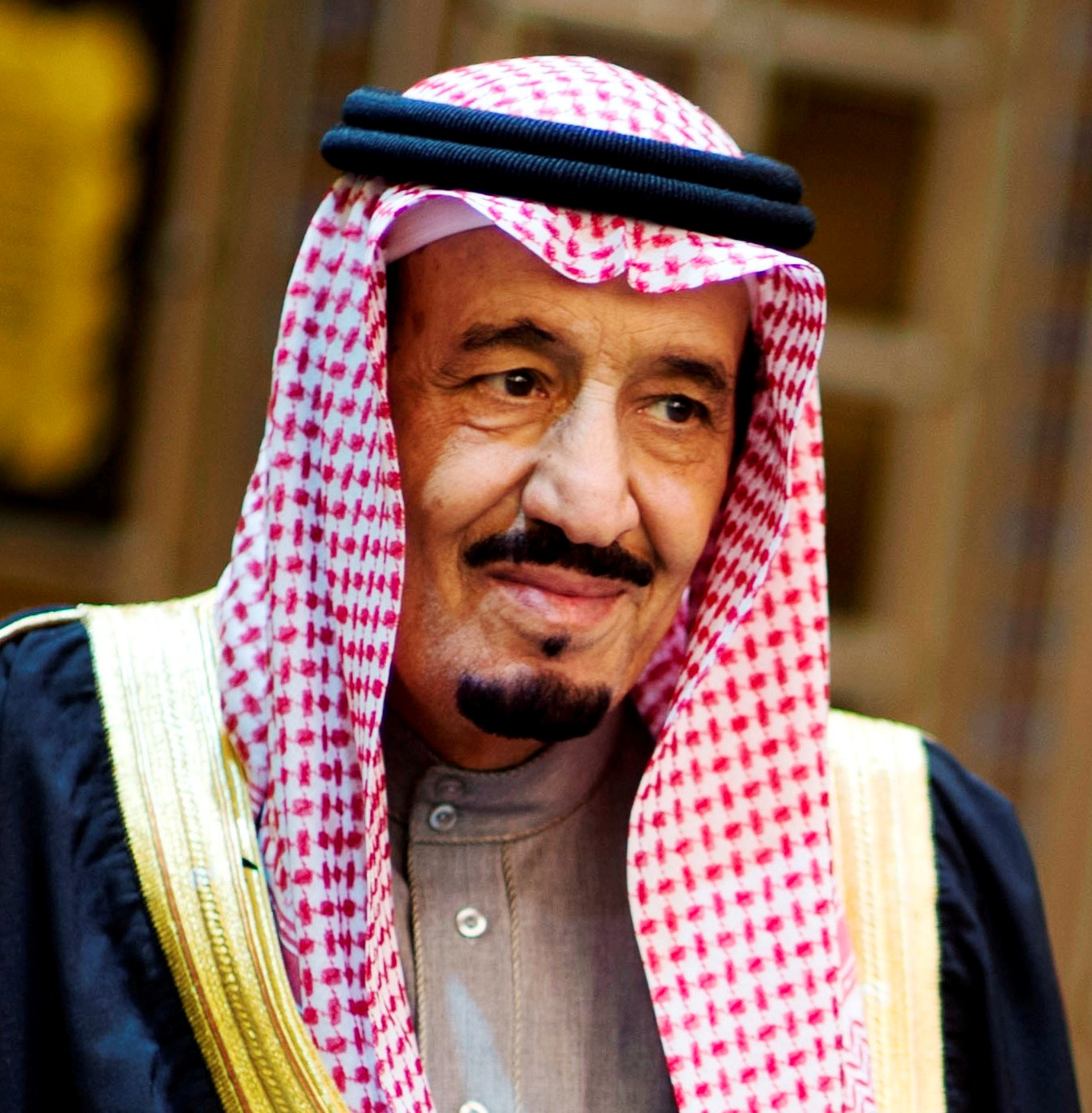
Salman
(born 1935)
- King of Saudi Arabia
  (2015–present)
- Crown Prince
  (2012–2015)
- Minister of Defense
  (2011–2015)
- Governor of Riyadh
  (1963–2011)

Ahmed
(born 1942)
- Removed from succession
- Interior Minister
  (2012–2012)
- Deputy Interior Minister
  (1975–2012)

=== Their sisters ===
- Princess Luluwah (1928–2008) was married to Faisal bin Turki bin Abdullah bin Saud Al Saud
- Princess Latifa (died September 2024)
- Princess Al Jawhara (died 2023) was married to Prince Khalid bin Abdullah bin Abdul Rahman Al Saud
- Princess Jawahir (died June 2015)

== Rise to power ==
The influence of the Sudairi Seven, which can be termed as asabiyya (group spirit) following the Khaldûnian terminology, grew constantly after the accession of its leader, Prince Fahd, to crown prince in 1975 and then king in 1982. They represented one out of five of King Abdulaziz’s sons. However, they gained influence and power not solely because of their number. Unlike many of King Abdulaziz's other sons who dealt much more with business activities, the Sudairi Seven tended to be interested in politics.

The Sudairi Seven's rise to power can be traced back to the accession of King Faisal and his earlier struggle with King Saud. Although not a Sudairi himself, Faisal, in his struggle to overthrow Saud, relied heavily upon the seven Sudairi brothers. One of the earliest significant roles played by the Sudairi Seven was in March 1962 when they collaborated with Crown Prince Faisal. They threatened five members of King Saud's cabinet to submit their resignations following the announcement of the constitution by the king which had been drafted by the members of the Free Princes movement with the help of Egyptian lawyers. The ministers, including Oil Minister Abdullah Tariki, resigned from the office as a result of their extensive campaign against them. Then in 1962, as prime minister and heir apparent, Prince Faisal appointed Prince Fahd as interior minister, Prince Sultan as defense minister, and Prince Salman as governor of Riyadh. All were key posts. Following his accession to the throne after King Saud's deposition in 1964, King Faisal continued to favor the Sudairi Seven as his allies.

In 1975, following the death of King Faisal and the accession of King Khalid, Prince Fahd became Crown Prince and Prince Nayef succeeded him at the ministry of interior. King Khalid reduced Sudairi Seven's power concerning succession in 1977 when he was in London for treatment. Following their unsuccessful attempt to overthrow King Khalid and to install Prince Sultan as crown prince instead of Prince Abdullah, King Khalid asked Crown Prince Fahd and Prince Abdullah to fully obey the existing succession plan without any change.

The Sudairis consolidated their hold over these fiefs by appointing their brothers and sons to their own ministries and other key positions. Prince Sultan appointed one of his younger Sudairi brothers – Prince Abdul Rahman – and one of his own sons – Prince Khalid – as his deputies. Another of Prince Sultan’s sons, Prince Bandar, served for two decades as Saudi ambassador in Washington and then head of the Saudi National Security Council. His other son Prince Khalid, the co-commander with U.S. General Norman Schwarzkopf in the Gulf War (1991), became vice defence minister. Prince Nayef also appointed one of his sons – Muhammad – as his deputy at the ministry of the interior.

The Sudairis’ rise to power and hold over government brought continuity to the system. It also prompted other princes to align quietly against them. The main opposition to the Sudairis came from Prince Abdullah prior to his accession to the throne. He cultivated allies among his other brothers and with King Faisal’s sons. Upon Prince Abdullah's accession to the throne, he created a new family council, the Allegiance Commission, to determine the future succession. The Sudairis filled a fifth of the council’s seats which is seen as a dilution of Sudairi power since their overall control over the state is perceived as proportionately greater than this.

== Reign of King Abdullah (2005–2015) ==
Mai Yamani argues that the Sudairi brothers, previously known as the Sudairi Seven, since King Fahd’s death in August 2005 reduced to al-Thaluth (‘the trio’), referring only to Prince Sultan, Prince Nayef and Prince Salman. Prince Sultan became the leader of the group after King Fahd's demise.

On 28 October 2011, Prince Nayef became the Crown Prince after the death of Prince Sultan, and his other full brother Prince Salman, who had been a long-term Riyadh governor, was appointed the minister of defence. However, the eldest surviving member of the Sudairi brothers, Prince Abdul Rahman, was replaced by Prince Sultan's son Prince Khalid as deputy minister of defence.

Prince Abdul Rahman was reported to argue that he should have been promoted instead of Prince Salman. On the other hand, the youngest of the Sudairi brothers, Ahmed, who had been Prince Nayef's deputy at the ministry of interior since 1975, was reported to complain about that Prince Nayef was actively promoting the interest of his own son, Prince Mohammed. Lastly, another Sudairi Prince Turki, who returned to Riyadh in early 2011 after a long and at least partly voluntary exile in Cairo, was said to agitate for a more senior position. On the other hand, Prince Turki fully supported the appointment of Prince Nayef as Crown Prince, indicating that the decision was completely right and that Prince Nayef had wisdom, sound management and long history in serving the country. However, although the Sudairi brothers support each other against other princes, each attempts to form, with his sons, another power group.

On 16 June 2012, Crown Prince Nayef died in Geneva. His posts were filled by his younger full-brothers. Prince Salman was named as the Crown Prince and deputy prime minister, and Prince Ahmed as the minister of interior on 18 June 2012. Prince Salman and Prince Ahmed became the only politically active members of the group. However, on 5 November 2012, Prince Ahmed resigned from his post and was succeeded by Mohammed bin Nayef, son of Prince Nayef. On 23 January 2015, King Abdullah died at the age of 90 and was succeeded by Prince Salman.

== Reign of King Salman (2015–present) ==
King Salman immediately began to consolidate power on behalf of the clan. His son Mohammad bin Salman became both minister of defense and secretary general of the Court, combining two of the most powerful offices in the government, and Mohammed bin Nayef bypassed hundreds of senior princes to become the first of the third generation to be officially placed in the line of succession.

On 28 April 2015, Mohammed bin Nayef was named crown prince, replacing Prince Muqrin bin Abdulaziz, the younger half-brother of the Sudairi Seven. Mohammad bin Salman Al Saud was named as deputy crown prince by his father, thus effectively putting the future of the throne in the Sudairi Seven clan's firm grip.

On 21 June 2017 Mohammad bin Salman was made crown prince, and Mohammed bin Nayef was removed from his posts and stripped of his titles. The interior minister was succeeded by Abdulaziz bin Saud, the grandson of Prince Nayef bin Abdulaziz. Thus the lines of Nayef and Salman, if not those of the other Sudairi brothers, maintain strong influence.

== See also ==
- Descendants of Abdulaziz of Saudi Arabia
- Succession to the Saudi Arabian throne
- Allegiance Council – Institution of succession to the Saudi throne

== Bibliography ==
- Madawi Al-Rasheed, A History of Saudi Arabia, Cambridge University Press, 2002, ISBN 0521644127
