= Al Faisaliah Group =

Saudi-based conglomerate

Al Faisaliah Group مجموعة الفيصلية
- Company type: Private
- Industry: Information Systems; food and beverage; multimedia
- Founded: 1970
- Headquarters: Riyadh
- Key people: Abdullah Al Faisal (Founder); Mohammed bin Khalid bin Abdullah Al Faisal (Group President); Ziad Al Tunisi (CEO)
- Revenue: $800 million (2005)
- Number of employees: 1000 to 5000 (2017)
- Website: alfaisaliah.com

The Al Faisaliah Group (Arabic: مجموعة الفيصلية), is a Saudi-based conglomerate established in 1970. Its name is derived from the name of its founder, Abdullah Al Faisal, eldest son of the late King Faisal.

Al Faisaliah Group includes 13 subsidiaries divided into several business units:

- Food and beverage – Al-Safi Danone dairy products; Alfa Co For Operation Services Ltd. meat products and restaurants
- Consumer Electronics – Medical, Measurement and Media Equipment, IT and Communications (IT networking and consulting), Internet service provider and FBTC Security Systems
- Entertainment and Multimedia – Joint ventures with companies such as SONY, SAP AG, Cisco Systems,
- Specialty Chemicals –Represents the regional interests of Bausch and Lomb.

In 2005, the company reported revenue of about $800 million and had over 5000 employees.

== Subsidiary ==
Alfa Co For Operation Services Ltd. was created in 2003 to develop Al Faisaliah Group food service businesses in Saudi Arabia and the GCC. Today, Alfa Co For Operation Services Ltd owns and operates some of the nation’s restaurant brands. With more than 2,000 employees, ALFA runs its own central commissary, food warehouse & distribution network, serving more than 60 branded restaurants across KSA and the region

== Activities ==
Sulaiman Al-Habib Medical Group has announced the signing of an agreement in Dubai with Al Faisaliah Group Medical Systems Co. in the presence of Prince Mohamed bin Khalid bin Abdullah Al Faisal, president and CEO of Al Faisaliah Group, to equip the "largest cardiac center" in the Kingdom's private sector. The group reported completing the initial phase of the 150-bed Sulaiman Al-Habib Hospital building at a cost exceeding $150 million.
