= Turki II bin Abdulaziz Al Saud =

Saudi royal, politician and businessman (1934–2016)

Deputy Minister of Defense and Aviation
- In office: July 1969 – 1978
- Successor: Abdul Rahman bin Abdulaziz
- Prime Minister: King Faisal; King Khalid
- Born: 1934
- Died: 11 November 2016 (aged 81–82); Riyadh, Saudi Arabia
- Burial: 12 November 2016; Al Oud cemetery, Riyadh
- Spouse: Noura bint Abdullah bin Abdul Rahman; Hind Al Fassi
- Issue: List: Prince Khalid Prince Sultan Prince Faisal Prince Fahd
Names
- Turki bin Abdulaziz bin Abdul Rahman Al Saud
- House: Al Saud
- Father: King Abdulaziz
- Mother: Hassa bint Ahmed Al Sudairi

Turki II bin Abdulaziz Al Saud (Arabic: تركي الثاني بن عبد العزيز آل سعود, Turkī aṯ ṯānī bin ʿAbdulʿazīz ʿĀl Suʿūd) (1934–11 November 2016) was a Saudi Arabian politician and businessman. A member of the House of Saud, he was the full brother of King Fahd and King Salman.

== Early life and education ==
Prince Turki was born in 1934. He was a member of the Sudairi Seven, a powerful faction of brothers within the Al Saud. His parents were King Abdulaziz and Hassa bint Ahmed Al Sudairi. He was known as Turki the second because he was the second son of King Abdulaziz named "Turki". The first Prince Turki was Abdulaziz's first son who died in 1919 due to Spanish flu.

Prince Turki studied at the Princes' School established by his father.

== Career ==
Turki bin Abdulaziz assumed the Riyadh principality delegation on 10 October 1957, because his brother Salman, governor of Riyadh (later King Salman), travelled with King Saud to Lebanon. In 1960 he also served as the acting governor when Prince Salman was on leave. Turki bin Abdulaziz was appointed deputy defense minister on 24 July 1969 by a royal order. His tenure lasted until 1978 when he was forced to resign from office due to his marriage to Hind Al Fassi.

== Controversy ==
After his falling-out with other princes and joining with the free princes group, Turki bin Abdulaziz moved to Cairo and lived there in self-imposed exile for a time. However, other research on the Free Princes Movement does not mention his name as part of this group; so an alternate explanation of his self-exile in Cairo offers that it occurred as a result of an intra-family dispute due to his marriage to Hind Al Fassi (See also below and Personal life section).

In February 1982, Turki bin Abdulaziz and his family, while living in Miami, were accused of holding an Egyptian servant against her will. Officers from the Miami Dade Police Department (MDPD) searched his apartment with a warrant but failed to find the woman. However, the police encountered fierce resistance from Prince Turki's bodyguards. He eventually sued the MDPD for $210 million, wherein the defendant then launched a countersuit. The State Department granted him diplomatic immunity in April 1982, and the lawsuit was dropped in June 1982.

In a letter published by Wagze news agency in July 2010, Prince Turki was reported to have warned Saudi Arabia's ruling family of a fate similar to that of Iraq's executed dictator Saddam Hussein and the ousted Iranian Shah Mohammad Reza Pahlavi, calling on them to escape before people "cut off our heads in streets." He argued that the Saudi royal family was no longer able to "impose" itself on people, arguing that deviations in carrying out the religious concepts that make up the basis of the Saudi government "have gotten out of our hands," so that the opposition views our acts as "interfering in people's private life and restricting their liberties." He further urged "Do it today before tomorrow as long as the money we have is enough for us to live anywhere in the world; from Switzerland to Canada and Australia... we should not return as long as we are able to get out safely, we must take our families quickly and pull out.", continuing "Do not fool yourself by relying on the United States or Britain or Israel, because they will not survive the loss; the only door open is now the exit door of no return. Let us go before it closes." He finally warned against a military coup against the ruling family, saying "no one will attack us from outside but our armed forces will attack us." However, later Turki bin Abdulaziz told Saudi Press Agency that the alleged letter to him circulated by some media and internet sites was nonexistent and fabricated by enemy parties wishing to spread confusion and excitement.

Another controversy he experienced was about the death of his wife Hind al Fassi in August 2010. Her brother Allal al Fassi accused his brother-in-law, Prince Turki as well as his nephew and niece of killing his sister with a drug overdose. He submitted a report to the Attorney General and then, disappeared for 24 hours and reappeared after the medical report proved that there was nothing wrong in her system, leading to the withdrawal of all his accusations to his brother in law. On the other hand, Prince Turki's son, Abdul Rahman, sued his uncle Allal al Fassi claiming that he beat him and his father in the hospital where his mother died.

== Views ==
During the Iraqi invasion of Kuwait in 1990, Prince Turki argued in a press conference that the United Nations' embargo was not enough to drive the Iraqi army out of Kuwait. For him, military action was required to achieve it.

After returning to Saudi Arabia in 2011, Prince Turki fully supported the appointments of his younger brothers, Prince Nayef and Prince Salman, as crown princes. He argued in October 2011 that the decision to appoint Prince Nayef to the post was totally right and that Prince Nayef had wisdom, sound management and long history in serving the country.

== Personal life and death ==
Turki bin Abdulaziz's first wife whom he divorced to marry Hind Al Fassi was Noura bint Abdullah, daughter of his uncle, Abdullah bin Abdul Rahman.

His second wife was Hind Al Fassi, a member of the Saudi Arabian Al Fassi family and daughter of Sheikh Shams ed din Al Fassi, a Sufi religious leader from the Shadhili order, and great-grandson of Moroccan Sufi Imam al-Fassi, a Hasani Idrissi descendant of Prophet Mohammed, who had settled in Mecca in the late 18th-century. Turki bin Abdulaziz sacrificed his position as deputy defense minister and moved from the Kingdom into a self exile because he refused to divorce her in late 1970s. Therefore, he lost not only his position but also his candidacy for the Saudi throne. Later, he and his wife settled in Egypt in the late 1970s and never returned to Saudi Arabia together again. She died in 2010 in Cairo at the age of 57. After her death, Prince Turki returned to Saudi Arabia in 2011.

Prince Turki had four sons from his first marriage, Prince Khalid (born December 1957), Prince Sultan (born May 1968), Prince Faisal (born January 1965) and Prince Fahd (born August 1959). In 1975, Prince Turki's elder sons took $1.1 million loan from the U.S. Export-Import Bank (Eximbank) to finance their business in relation to rice mills in Saudi Arabia. Prince Khaled is the cofounder of Arab National Bank.

One of Prince Turki's daughters is married to Khalid bin Sultan. His son, Sultan, was "kidnapped" in Geneva and placed under house arrest in Riyadh in 2004 after he spoke out in favour of reform in Saudi Arabia. Another son, Faisal bin Turki, was an adviser at the ministry of petroleum and natural resources in the mid-2000s.

Prince Turki died on 11 November 2016. He was buried at Al Oud cemetery in Riyadh on 12 November 2016.
