= List of international presidential trips made by Ahmed al-Sharaa =

Ahmed al-Sharaa has made a total of 30 public international trips to 16 countries as the President of Syria since 29 January 2025. The state-owned Syrian Arab News Agency classifies these trips as either official visits or working visits.

Unless otherwise stated, the President was accompanied on all of his trips by Foreign Minister Asaad al-Shaibani and members of the Syrian delegation.

== Summary ==
The number of visits per country where he has traveled are:

- One: Azerbaijan, Bahrain, Brazil, Cyprus, Egypt, France, Germany, Jordan, Kuwait and the United Kingdom
- Two: Russia
- Three: United States
- Four: United Arab Emirates
- Five: Qatar
- Six: Saudi Arabia and Turkey

Map of international trips made by Ahmed al-Sharaa as president, as of 2026: Syria One visit Two visits Three visits Four or more visits

== 2025 ==
	Country	Areas visited	Dates	Details
1	Saudi Arabia	Riyadh; Jeddah; Mecca	2–3 February	Met with Crown Prince Mohammed bin Salman, accompanied by Foreign Minister Asaad al-Shaibani. It was the first official trip abroad since the fall of the Assad regime. He later went to Jeddah to head for Mecca to perform Umrah.
2	Turkey	Ankara	4 February	Met with Turkish president Recep Tayyip Erdoğan.
3	Jordan	Amman	26 February	Official visit. Met with Abdullah II of Jordan, accompanied by Foreign Minister Asaad al-Shaibani.
4	Egypt	Cairo	4 March	President al-Sharaa attended the Arab League's emergency summits. On the sidelines of the summits, he met with President Abdel Fattah el-Sisi, European Council president António Costa, Palestinian president Mahmoud Abbas, Lebanese President Joseph Aoun, United Nations Secretary-General António Guterres, and Yemeni Presidential Leadership Council Chairman Rashad al-Alimi.
5	Turkey	Antalya	11–13 April	President al-Sharaa and First Lady Latifa al-Droubi attended the fourth Antalya Diplomacy Forum. On the sidelines of the Antalya Diplomacy Forum, he met with Azerbaijani president Ilham Aliyev, Kosovan president Vjosa Osmani, Kurdistan Region president Nechirvan Barzan, Libyan prime minister Abdul Hamid Dbeibeh, Qatari prime minister Mohammed bin Abdulrahman al-Thani, and Turkish president Recep Tayyip Erdoğan.
6	United Arab Emirates	Abu Dhabi	13 April	Official visit. Met with UAE president Mohamed bin Zayed Al Nahyan and his accompanying delegation.
7	Qatar	Doha	15 April	Official visit. Met with Emir Tamim bin Hamad Al Thani, accompanied by Foreign Minister Asaad al-Shaibani. He later met with the Syrian community group, followed by an official meeting with Iraqi Prime Minister Mohammed Shia' Al Sudani and Emir Tamim bin Hamad Al Thani.
8	France	Paris	7 May	Official visit. Met with President Emmanuel Macron, accompanied by Foreign Minister Asaad al-Shaibani, Disaster Management and Emergency Response Minister Raed al-Saleh, and Director of the General Intelligence Service Hussein al-Salama. It was the first official visit to Europe since taking office as president.
9	Bahrain	Sakhir	10 May	Official visit. Met with King Hamad bin Isa Al Khalifa, accompanied by the Syrian delegation. Upon arrival, he met Nasser bin Hamad Al Khalifa.
10	Saudi Arabia	Riyadh	14 May	Met with US President Donald Trump. It was the first meeting between the American and Syrian heads of state since Bill Clinton and Hafez al-Assad convened in Geneva in 2000. Crown Prince Mohammed bin Salman and Turkish president Recep Tayyip Erdoğan took part in the meeting.
11	Turkey	Istanbul; Ankara	24–25 May	Met with Turkish president Recep Tayyip Erdoğan, Foreign Minister Hakan Fidan, Defense Minister Yaşar Güler, and Intelligence Director İbrahim Kalın at the Dolmabahçe Palace, accompanied by Foreign Minister Asaad al-Shaibani, Defense Minister Murhaf Abu Qasra. He later met with U.S. Ambassador to Turkey, Tom Barrack.
12	Kuwait	Kuwait City	1 June	Official visit. Met with Emir Mishal Al-Ahmad Al-Jaber Al-Sabah, accompanied by the Syrian delegation. He later met with the Syrian delegation from the Syrian community and a Kuwaiti businessman, followed by an expanded meeting with Kuwait's First Deputy Prime Minister and Minister of Interior, Fahad Yusuf Al-Sabah, and Foreign Minister Abdullah Ali Al-Yahya.
13	United Arab Emirates	Abu Dhabi	7 July	Working and official visit. President al-Sharaa arrived via Al Bateen Airport and was received by UAE Foreign Minister Abdullah bin Zayed Al Nahyan. He met with UAE president Mohamed bin Zayed Al Nahyan, accompanied by the Syrian delegation, to discuss the advancement of Syria–United Arab Emirates relations.
14	Azerbaijan	Baku	12 July	Working visit. Met with Azerbaijani president Ilham Aliyev, accompanied by the Syrian delegation, for an expanded meeting between the two countries.
15	Qatar	Doha	15 September	President al-Sharaa attended the Arab–Islamic extraordinary summits. On the sidelines of the summits, he met with Emir Tamim bin Hamad Al Thani, Crown Prince Mohammed bin Salman, Lebanese President Joseph Aoun, and Turkish president Recep Tayyip Erdoğan.
16	United States	New York City	21–26 September	President al-Sharaa arrived in New York City to attend the 80th opening of the United Nations General Assembly. On the following day, al-Sharaa met with Marco Rubio, the U.S. Secretary of State, at the Lotte New York Palace Hotel. He later met with members of the Syrian community and eleven members of the Jewish community. He then participated in the 2025 Concordia Annual Summit and met with former U.S. General David Petraeus. He then participated in the Two-State Solution Conference at the UN. On 24 September, he addressed the general debate of the 80th session of the United Nations General Assembly, becoming the first Syrian leader to do so since Nureddin al-Atassi in 1967. (Note: Nureddin al-Atassi spoke after the Six-Day War, not during the general debate. Neither Hafez al-Assad nor Bashar al-Assad spoke at the UNGA during their presidencies.) On the sidelines of the UN general assembly, President al-Sharaa met separately with US President Donald Trump, US First Lady Melania Trump, United Nations Secretary-General António Guterres, Latvian President Edgars Rinkēvičs, Czech President Petr Pavel, Greek Prime Minister Kyriakos Mitsotakis, Turkish president Recep Tayyip Erdoğan, Italian Prime Minister Giorgia Meloni, Netherlands Prime Minister Dick Schoof, Norwegian Prime Minister Jonas Gahr Støre, King Felipe VI of Spain, French President Emmanuel Macron, and Ukrainian President Volodymyr Zelenskyy. Following these meetings, Zelenskyy and al-Sharaa announced the restoration of diplomatic relations between their countries, which had been severed after the Assad regime recognized the independence of the Donetsk and Luhansk People's Republics in June 2022. President al-Sharaa participated in a discussion with Charles Lister at the Middle East Institute.
17	Russia	Moscow	15 October	Official visit. President al-Sharaa arrived in Moscow, accompanied by Foreign Minister Asaad al-Shaibani, Defense Minister Murhaf Abu Qasra, General Intelligence Director Hussein al-Salama, and Secretary-General to the Presidency Maher al-Sharaa. He later met with Russian President Vladimir Putin at the Kremlin Palace. He also met the Syrian community in Russia with al-Shaibani. It was the first official visit since the fall of Kremlin ally Bashar al-Assad and his subsequent exile to Russia.
18	Saudi Arabia	Riyadh	28–29 October	Official visit. President al-Sharaa arrived in Riyadh to attend the ninth Future Investment Initiative Institute conference. He later held a meeting with Saudi Foreign Minister Faisal bin Farhan Al Saud, Interior Minister Abdulaziz bin Saud Al Saud, Nayef bin Sultan Al Kabeer, Chairman of the Board of Directors of Saudi Arabia's Almarai Company, and Olayan M. Alwetaid, CEO of the Saudi Telecom Company; and Abdullah Alswaha, Minister of Communications and Information Technology of Saudi Arabia. The meeting was also attended by Foreign Minister Asaad al-Shaibani. On the sidelines of the Future Investment Initiative Institute conference, President al-Sharaa met with several prominent figures, including Mazin Abdulrazzak al-Rumaih, Chairman of the Board of Directors of the Banque Saudi Fransi; Abdulmalek bin Abdullah al-Hoqail, CEO of Alinma Bank; Ahmed Shahini, Deputy CEO of the Saudi SALIC Company; Saudi Minister of Investment Khalid al-Falih; FIFA President Gianni Infantino; Richard Attias, Chairman of the Executive Committee and member of the Board of Trustees of the Future Investment Initiative Institute; Éric Martel, President and CEO of Bombardier; Omeed Malik and Chris Buskirk, Co-founders of the American investment firm 1789 Capital; Patrick Pouyanné, Chairman and CEO of the French energy company TotalEnergies; Christopher J. Nassetta, President and CEO of Hilton Worldwide; Sébastien Bazin, Chairman and CEO of Accor; Mary Callahan Erdoes, CEO of Asset and Wealth Management at J.P. Morgan & Co; Eren Schmidt, CEO of the American aerospace company Relativity Space; and Matteo Renzi, former Prime Minister of Italy and current member of the Italian Senate. He later met with Crown Prince Mohammed bin Salman and Kosovan President Vjosa Osmani, during which Syria officially recognized the Republic of Kosovo as an independent and sovereign state, following a trilateral meeting in Riyadh that included officials from Syria, Saudi Arabia, and Kosovo. President al-Sharaa participated in a plenary session dialogue at the ninth edition of the Future Investment Initiative Conference.
19	Brazil	Belém	6–7 November	President al-Sharaa arrived in Brazil to attend the 2025 United Nations Climate Change Conference. This marks the first time a Syrian President has participated in the annual climate summit since its establishment in 1995. He was received by Brazilian President Luiz Inácio Lula da Silva. On the sidelines of the 2025 United Nations Climate Change Conference, President al-Sharaa held meetings with several key leaders, including Italian Deputy Prime Minister and Foreign Minister Antonio Tajani, World Bank Group President Ajay Banga, Turkish Vice President Cevdet Yılmaz, Yemeni Presidential Leadership Council Vice President Tareq Saleh, Spanish Prime Minister Pedro Sánchez, Finnish President Alexander Stubb, and WHO Director-General Tedros Adhanom Ghebreyesus. The meeting was also attended by Foreign Minister Asaad al-Shaibani.
20	United States	Washington, D.C.	8–10 November	Main article: November 2025 visit by Ahmed al-Sharaa to the United States Official visit. President al-Sharaa arrived in the United States and visited the White House. He met with US President Donald Trump, US Vice President JD Vance, US Secretary of State Marco Rubio, the US envoy to Syria Tom Barrack, and Congressman Brian Mast. This visit marked the first time a Syrian president had visited the White House since Syria gained independence in 1946. Previously, al-Sharaa met with representatives of Syrian-American organizations in Washington and held discussions with Kristalina Georgieva, the Managing Director of the International Monetary Fund. The meeting was also attended by Foreign Minister Asaad al-Shaibani. He held an open dialogue meeting with the Syrian community in Washington, D.C., attended by Foreign Minister Asaad Hassan al-Shaibani and US Special envoy to Syria Tom Barrack.
21	Qatar	Doha	5 December	Official visit. President al-Sharaa visited the Qatari capital, Doha, to take part in the Doha Forum 2025. Al-Sharaa was accompanied by Foreign Minister Assad Hassan al-Shaibani and Minister of Higher Education and Scientific Research Marwan al-Halabi. He met with members of the Syrian national football team who were participating in the 2025 FIFA Arab Cup. He also attended the 2025 World Arabian Horse Championship Supreme in Doha alongside Emir Tamim bin Hamad Al Thani. Al-Sharaa participated in the Newsmaker Interview, led by Christiane Amanpour, who is the Chief International Anchor for CNN. The president was asked a variety of questions, ranging from Syria being integrated into the International community, Al-Sharaa's reaction to Israel's invasion and bombing of southern Syria, and the 2025 massacres of Syrian Alawites. He visited the Al Jazeera Media Network, where he met with the Director General, Sheikh Nasser bin Faisal Al Thani, and other staff members of the channel.

== 2026 ==
	Country	Areas visited	Dates	Details
22	Russia	Moscow	28 January	Official visit. President al-Sharaa arrived in Moscow, accompanied by Foreign Minister Asaad al-Shaibani, Defense Minister Murhaf Abu Qasra, and Secretary-General to the Presidency Maher al-Sharaa. He later met with Russian President Vladimir Putin at the Kremlin Palace. The agenda included the status and prospects for developing bilateral relations in various areas, as well as the current situation in the Middle East.
23	Germany	Berlin	29–30 March	Official visit. President al-Sharaa arrived in Berlin accompanied by a ministerial delegation. He met a delegation representing the Syrian community in Berlin in the presence of Foreign Minister Asaad al-Shaibani. Al-Sharaa met German President Frank-Walter Steinmeier at Bellevue Palace. He later met German Chancellor Friedrich Merz at the Federal Chancellery in Berlin.
24	United Kingdom	London	31 March—1 April	Official visit. President al-Sharaa arrived in London accompanied by a ministerial delegation. He met Prime Minister Keir Starmer at 10 Downing Street in London. Al-Sharaa became the first Syrian head of state to visit London since former president Bashar al-Assad visited the United Kingdom in 2002. Then, he was received by King Charles III at Buckingham Palace. President al-Sharaa participated in a Chatham House event led by Bronwen Maddox.
25	Turkey	Antalya	16–17 April	President al-Sharaa arrived on Turkey to participate in the fifth edition of the Antalya Diplomacy Forum. On the sidelines of his official visit, President al-Sharaa received US Special Envoy for Syria Tom Barrack at his residence in Antalya. Syrian Foreign Minister Asaad al-Shaibani and the Director of the General Intelligence Service, Hussein al-Salama, attended the meeting. Al-Sharaa met with Azerbaijani President Ilham Aliyev and Yemeni Prime Minister and Foreign Minister Shaya al-Zindani, in the presence of the Syrian Foreign Minister and the Director of the General Intelligence Service. He later met with the President of the Kurdistan Region of Iraq, Nechirvan Barzani, and his accompanying delegation. Al-Sharaa also met with Turkish President Recep Tayyip Erdoğan and the accompanying Turkish delegation on the sidelines of the Antalya Diplomacy Forum. Al-Sharaa met with the UN High Commissioner for Refugees, Barham Salih. President al-Sharaa participated in a panel discussion during the fifth Antalya Diplomacy Forum.
26	Saudi Arabia	Jeddah	21 April	Official visit. President al-Sharaa arrived in Jeddah as part of a Gulf tour. He met Saudi Arabia's Crown Prince Mohammed bin Salman. He later met Mohammed bin Abdullah Abu Nayan, the Chairman of the Saudi-Syrian Business Council.
27	Qatar	Doha	22 April	President al-Sharaa met in Doha with Qatar’s Emir, Tamim bin Hamad Al Thani. The meeting was attended by Syrian Foreign Minister Asaad al-Shaibani and Qatar’s Prime Minister and Foreign Minister, Mohammed bin Abdulrahman bin Jassim Al Thani, along with several officials from both countries.
28	United Arab Emirates	Abu Dhabi	22 April	Official visit: President al-Sharaa and the accompanying delegation arrived in Abu Dhabi. He was received upon arrival by UAE Foreign Minister, Abdullah bin Zayed Al Nahyan. He met with UAE President Mohamed bin Zayed Al Nahyan. The meeting was attended by Syrian Foreign Minister Asaad al-Shaibani, the UAE Foreign Minister, and senior officials from both sides.
29	Cyprus	Nicosia	24 April	President al-Sharaa attended a European Council summit with regional partners held at the Filoxenia Conference Center in Nicosia. He met with a number of presidents and leaders on the sidelines of the Informal Meeting of European Union Heads of State and regional partners in Nicosia, in the presence of Foreign Minister Asaad al-Shaibani. Al-Sharaa met with French President Emmanuel Macron on the sidelines of the informal meeting of European Union Heads of State.
30	Turkey	Ankara	8 July	President al-Sharaa arrived at the Presidential Complex in Ankara to attend the NATO Summit.
31	Qatar	Doha	13 July	Met with Sheikh Tamim bin Hamad Al Thani and Prime Minister Mohammed bin Abdulrahman bin Jassim Al Thani and offered condolences on the death of former Emir Hamad bin Khalifa Al Thani.
32	United Arab Emirates	Dubai	15 September	Syria's al-Sharaa opens the biggest Arab Media Summit yet.
33	United States of America	New York City	21 September	President Al-Sharaa arrives in New York for UN general Assembly.
34	Saudi Arabia	Riyadh	6 October	Saudi Crown Prince meets Syria's President Al Sharaa in Riyadh.
35	Saudi Arabia	Riyadh	4 November	Syria, Saudi Arabia sign defence deal.
36	Turkey	Antalya	11 November	Syrian President arrives in Turkiye for COP31 Climate Summit.

== Future trips ==
Country	Location	Date	Details
Saudi Arabia	Jeddah or Riyadh	To be announced	Sharaa is scheduled to attend the 2026 AL summit.
Switzerland	Davos	January 2027	Sharaa is scheduled to attend the Davos Forum.
Azerbaijan	Baku	23-24 June 2027	Sharaa is scheduled to attend the 16th OIC summit.
Morocco	Rabat	To be announced	Official visit.
Oman	Muscat	To be announced	Official visit.
Pakistan	Islamabad	To be announced	Official visit.
Malaysia	Kuala Lumpur	To be announced	Official visit.
Indonesia	Jakarta	To be announced	Official visit.
Algeria	Algiers	To be announced	Official visit.

== Gallery ==
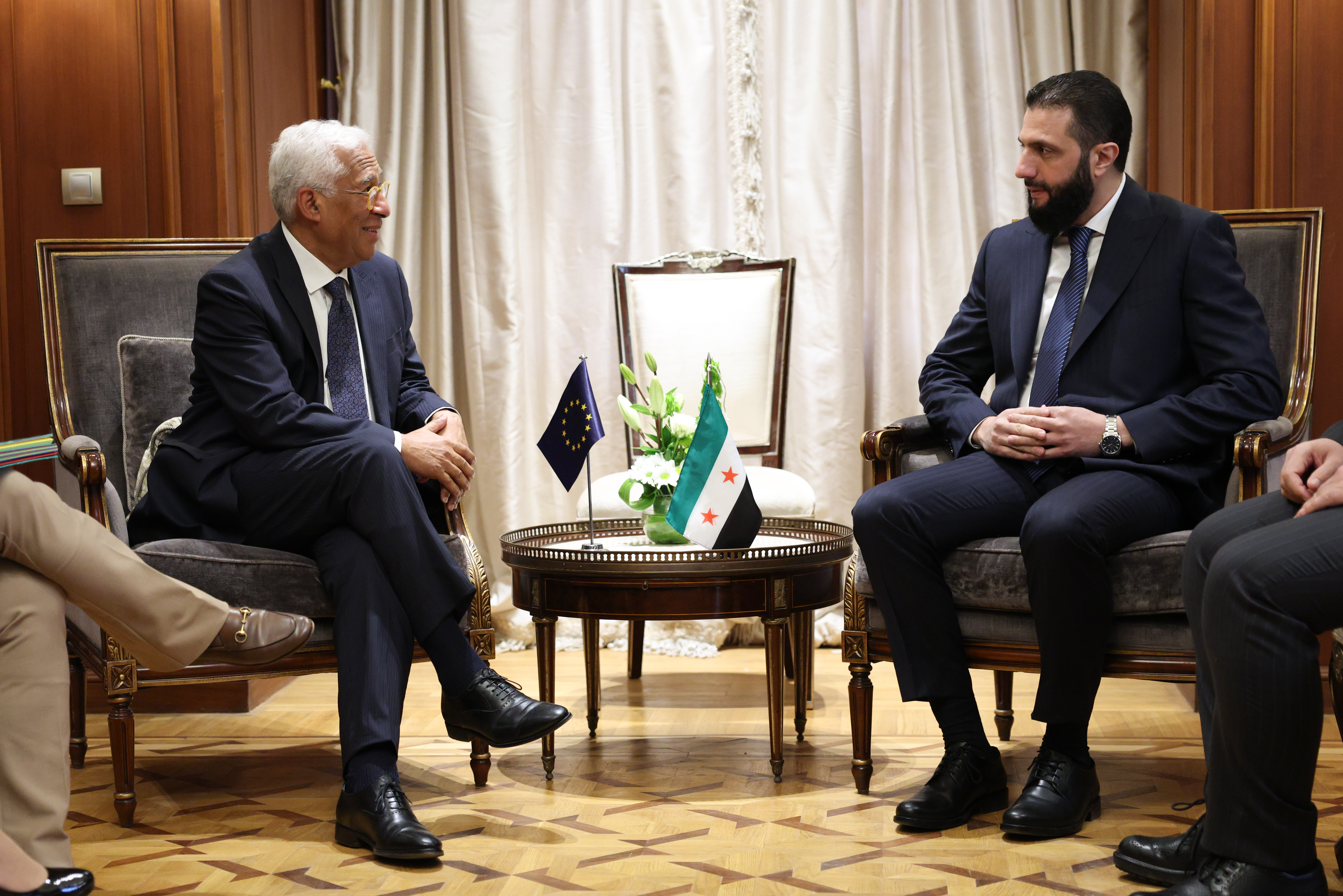
Al-Sharaa with European Council President António Costa, 3 March 2025

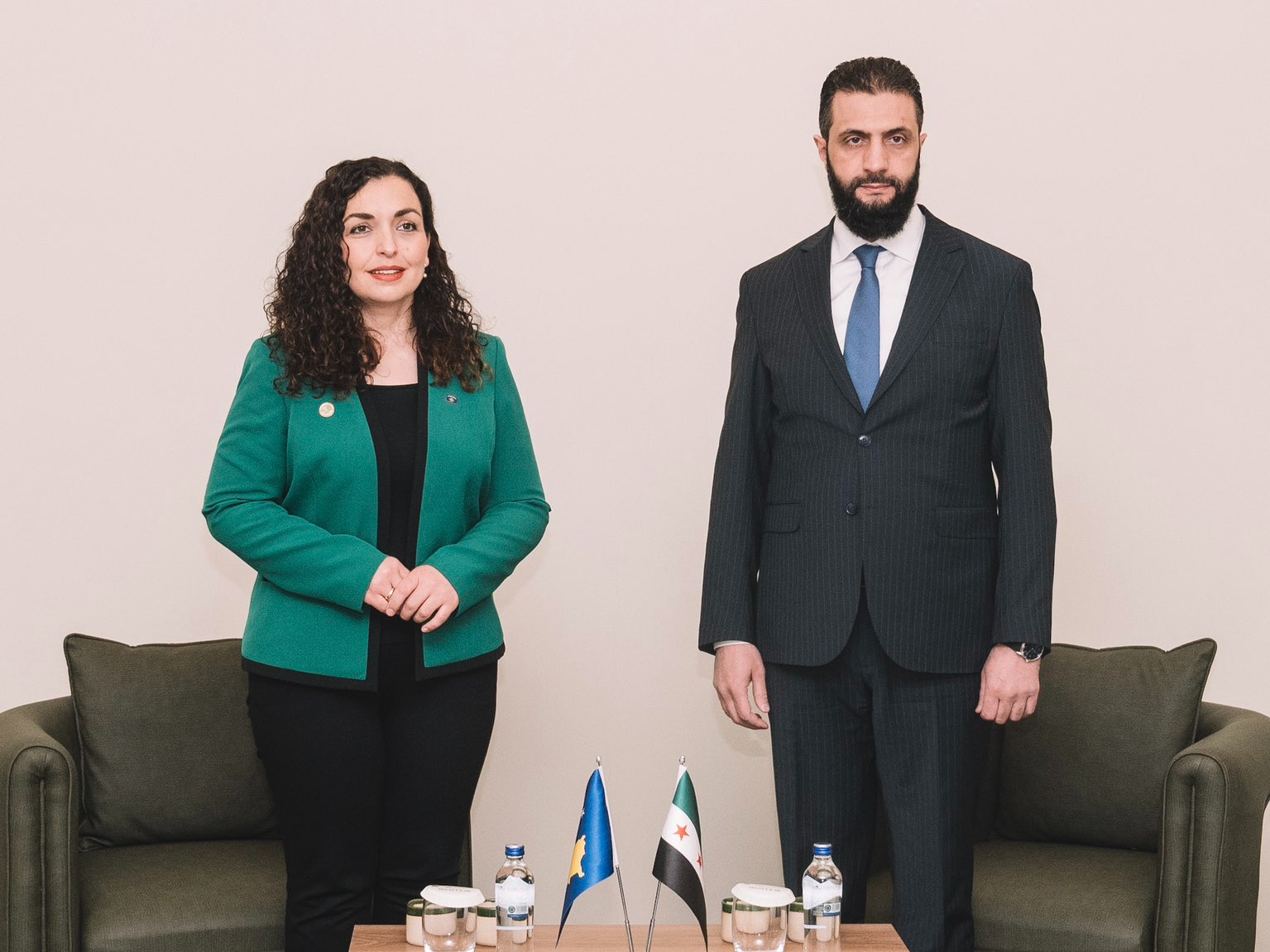
Al-Sharaa with Kosovan president Vjosa Osmani, 11 April 2025

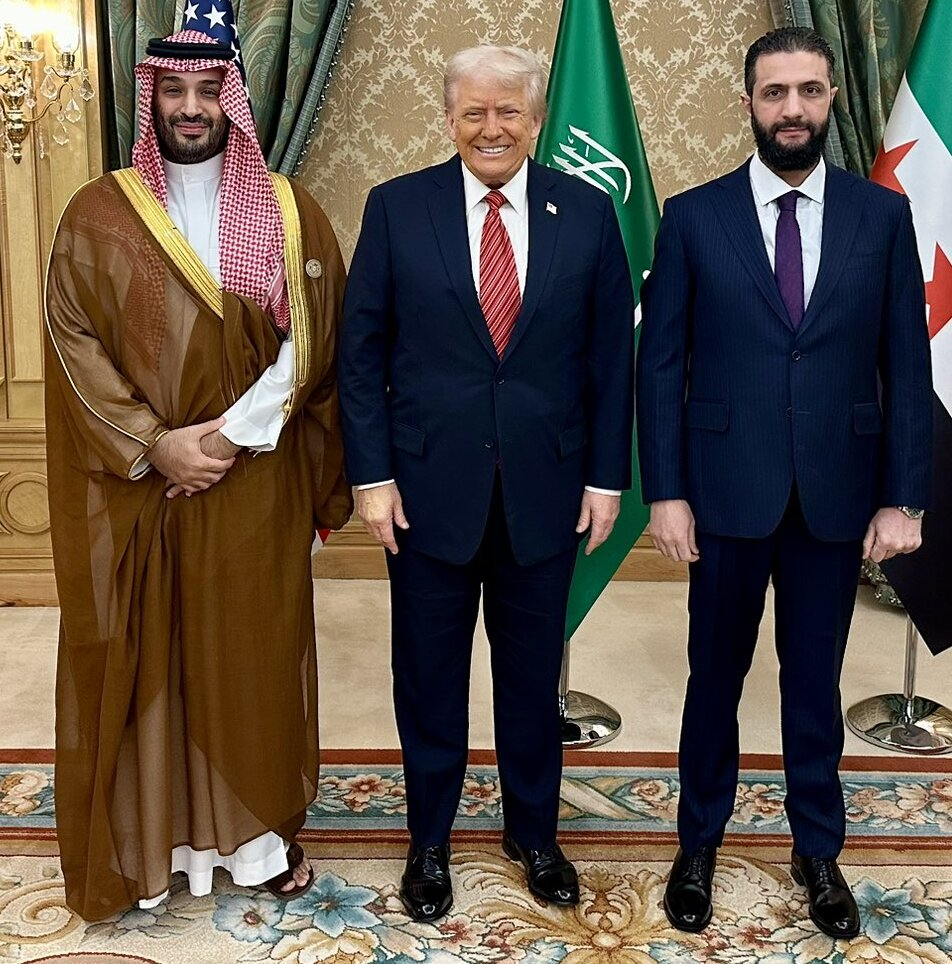
Al-Sharaa with US President Donald Trump and Crown Prince of Saudi Arabia Mohammed bin Salman, 14 May 2025

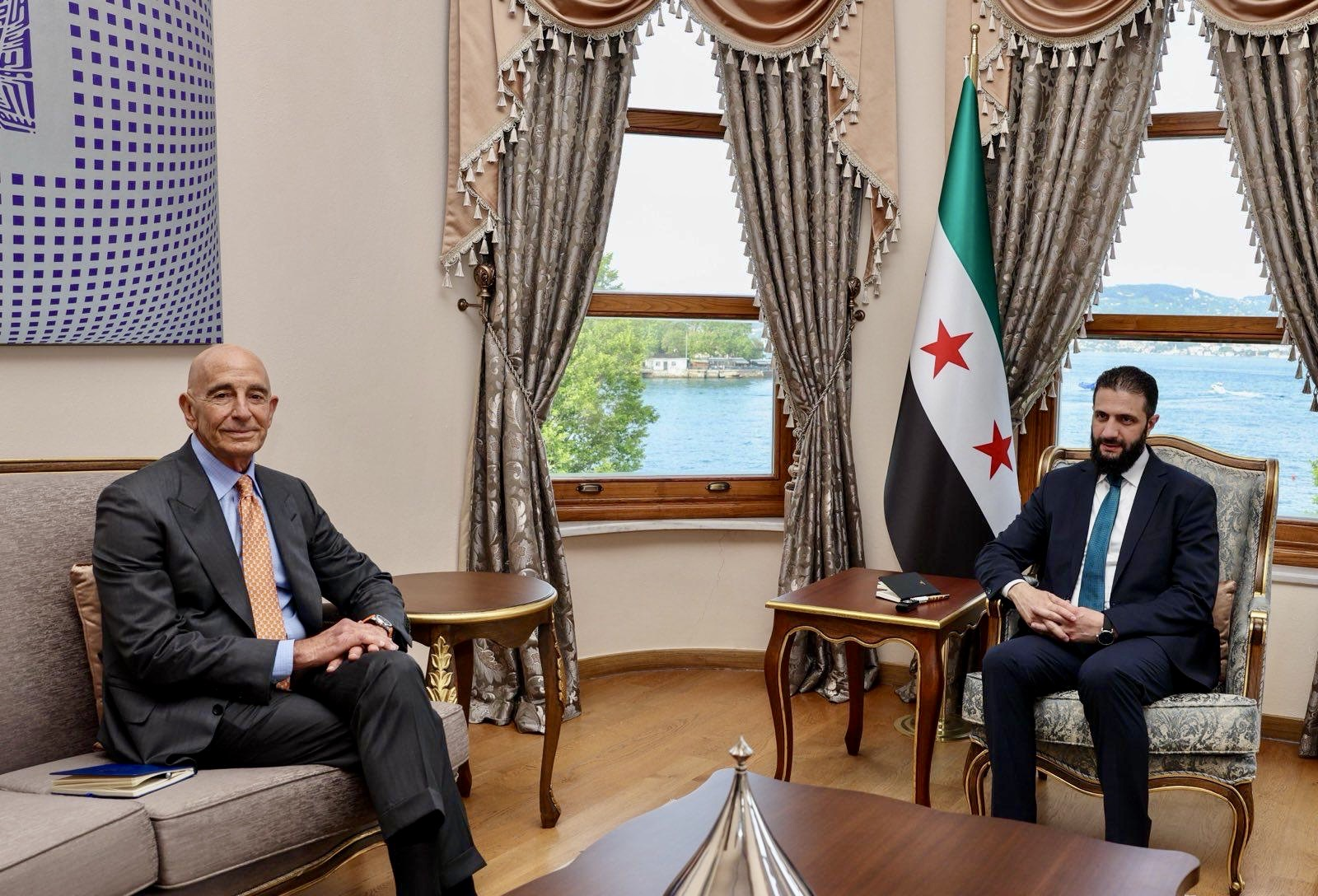
Al-Sharaa with US Special Envoy for Syria Tom Barrack, 25 May 2025

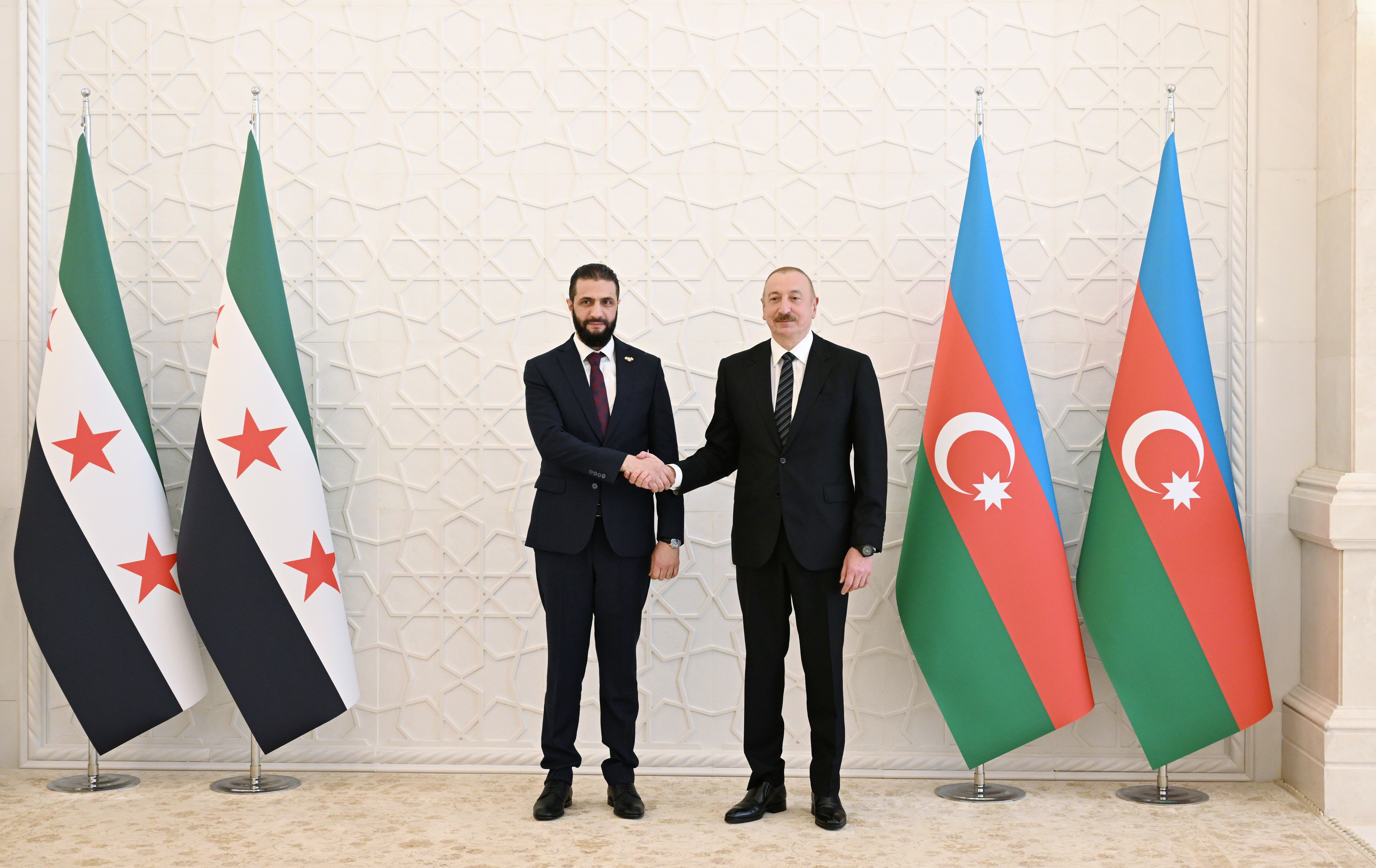
Al-Sharaa shakes hands with Azerbaijani President Ilham Aliyev, 12 July 2025

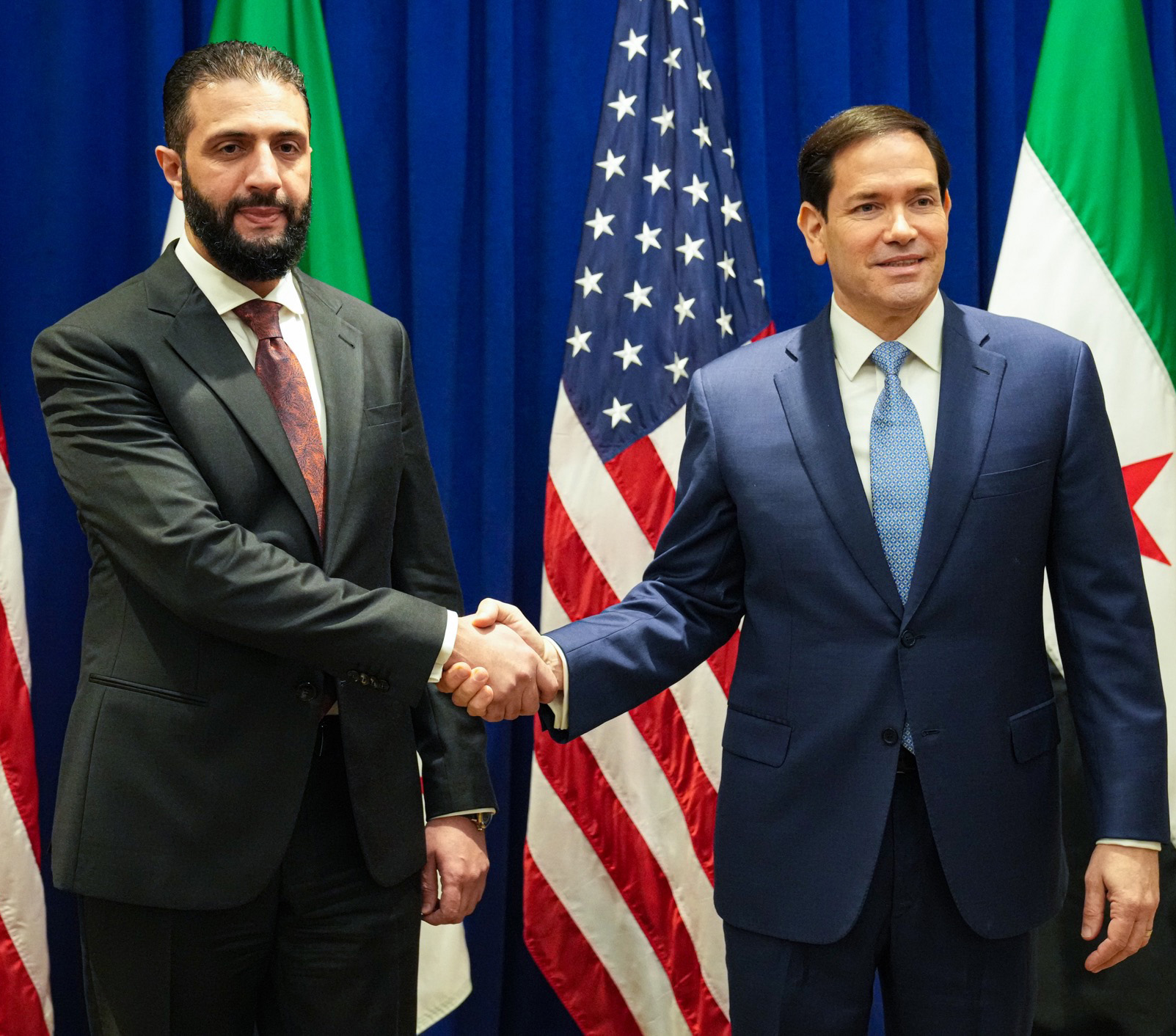
Al-Sharaa shakes hands with U.S. Secretary of State Marco Rubio, 22 September 2025

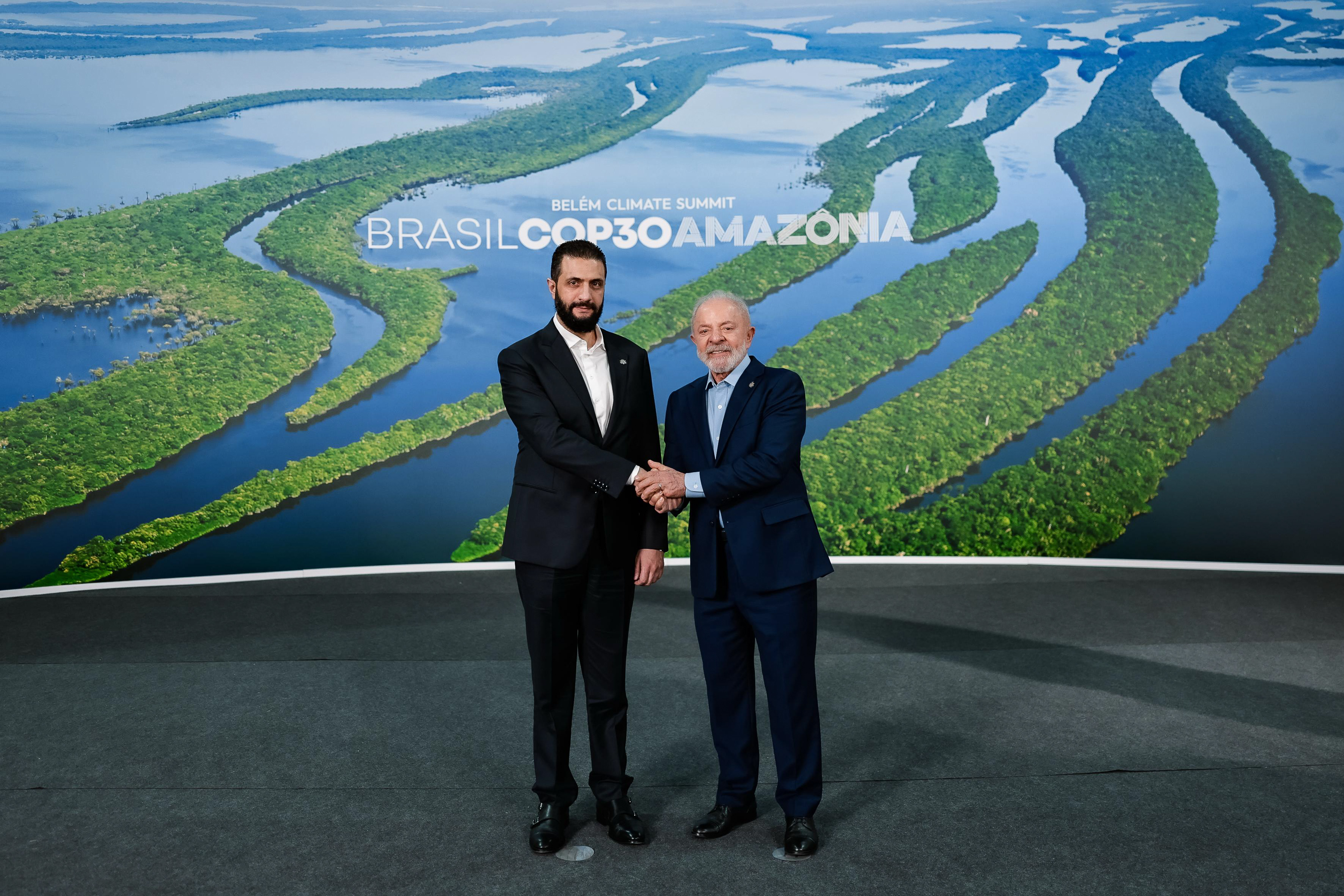
Al-Sharaa with Brazilian President Luiz Inácio Lula da Silva, 6 November 2025

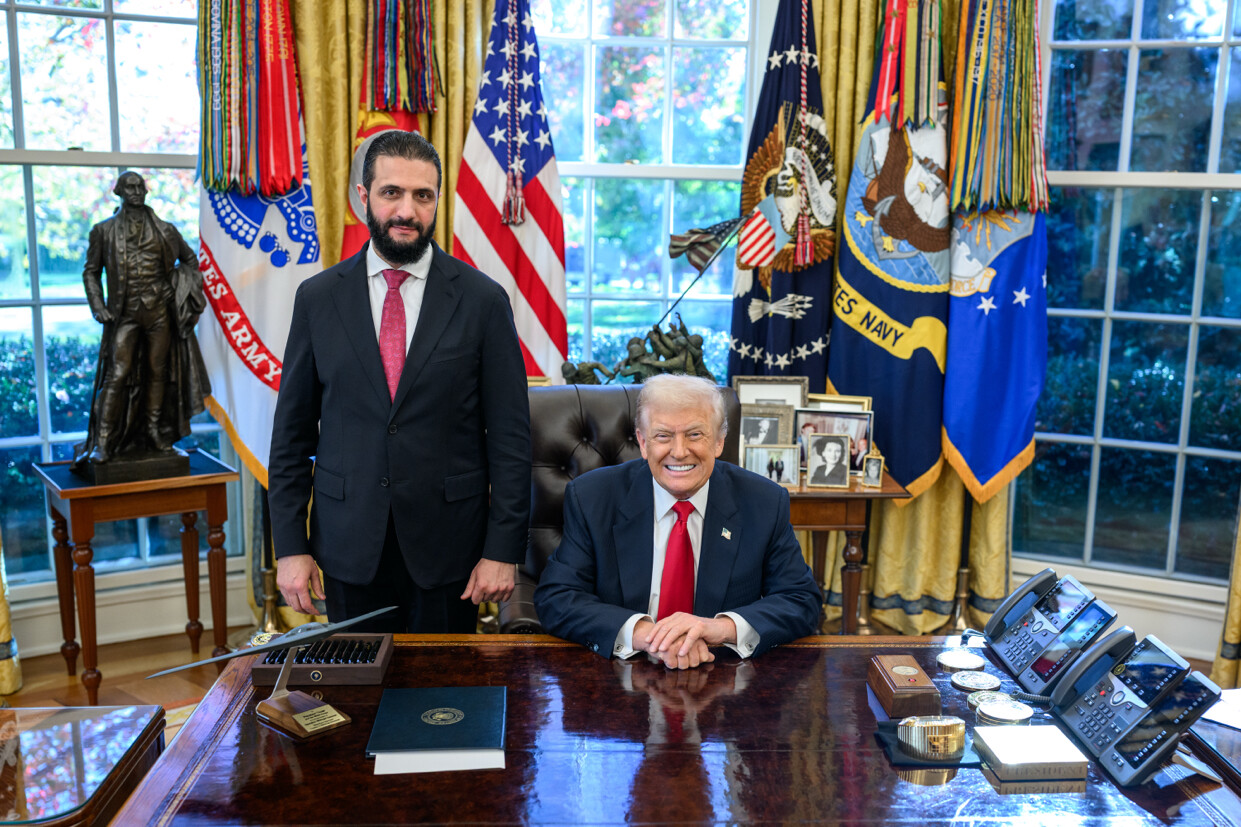
Al-Sharaa with US President Donald Trump in the Oval Office, 10 November 2025

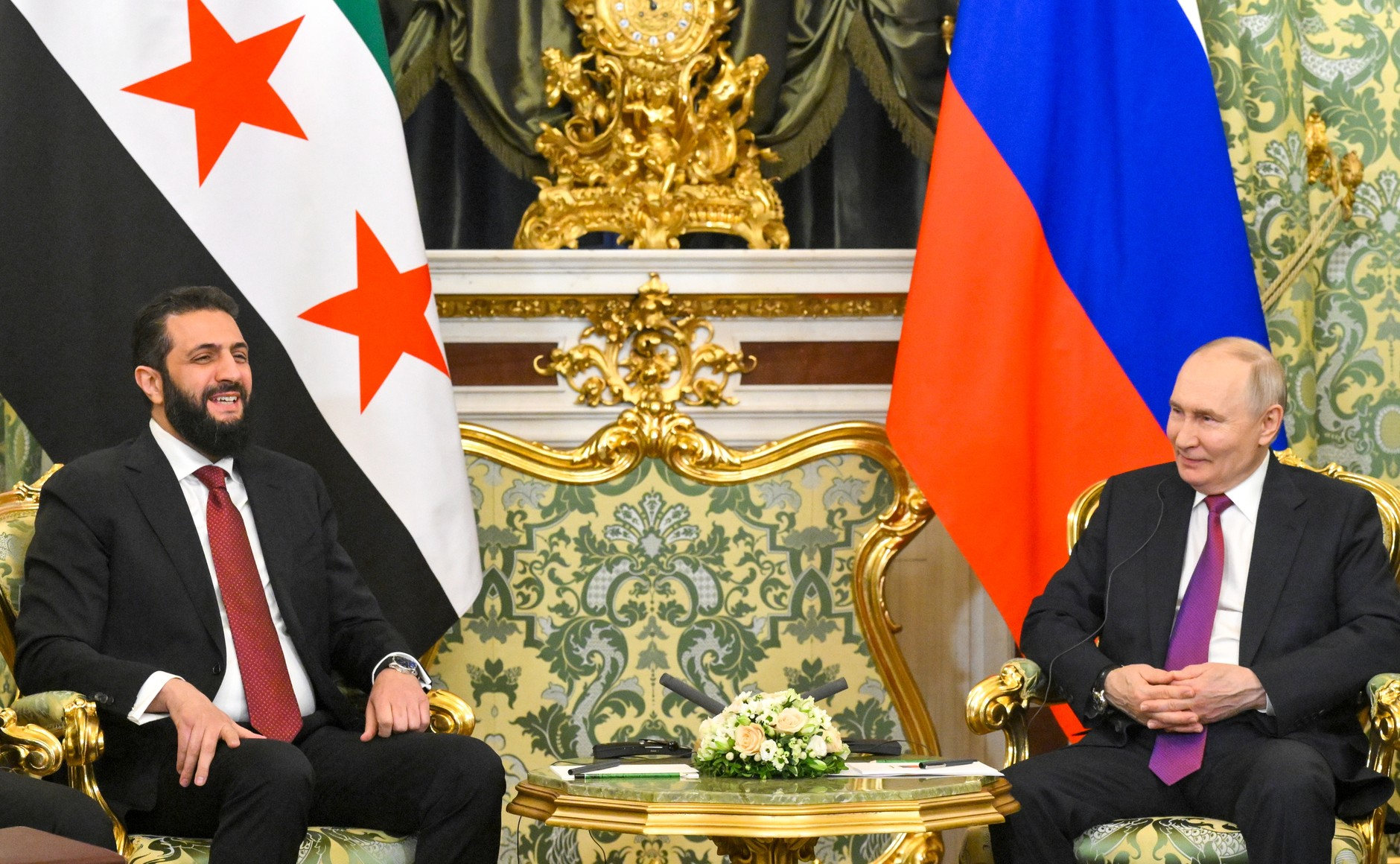
Al-Sharaa with Vladimir Putin, 28 January 2026

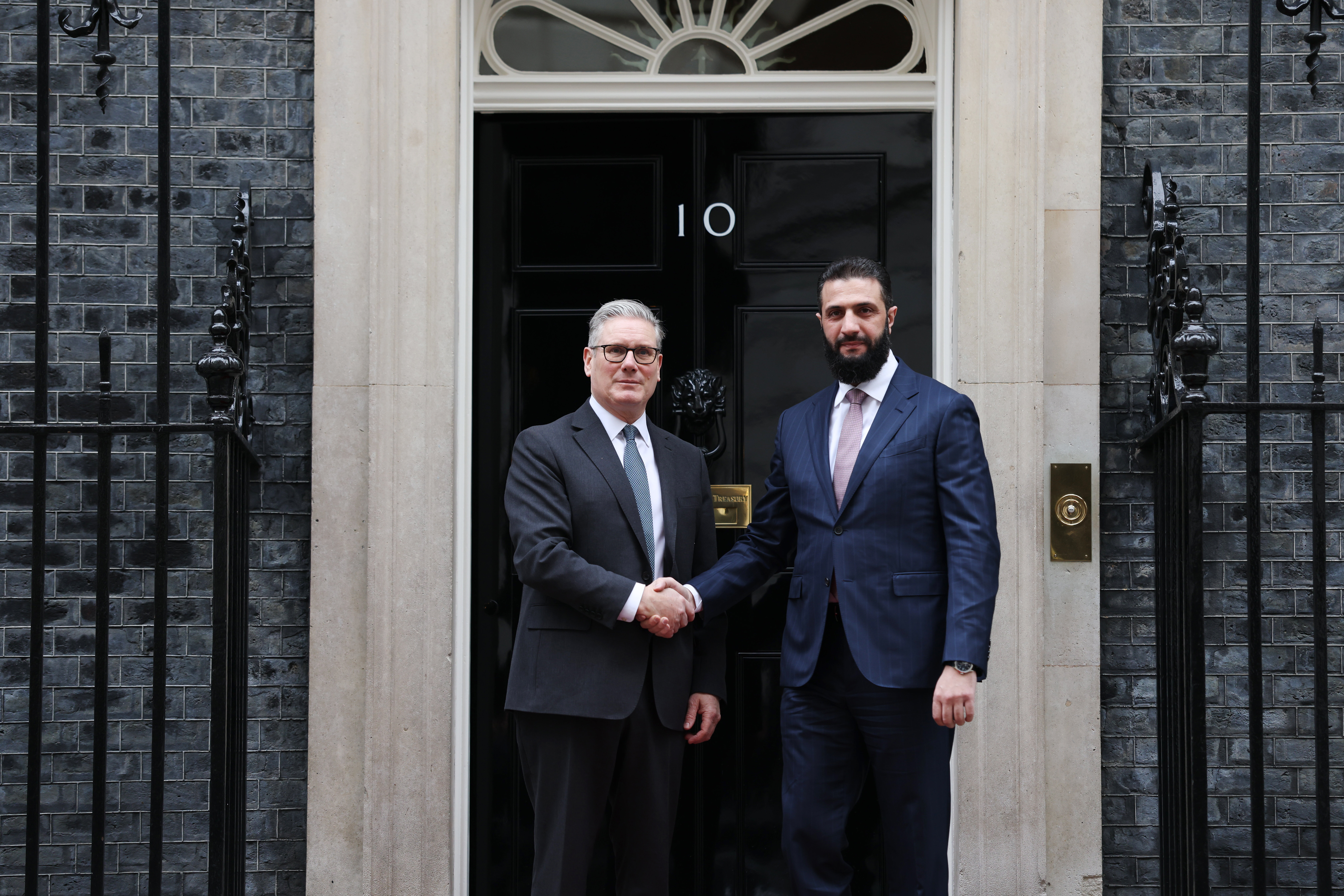
Al-Sharaa with Prime Minister Keir Starmer, 31 March 2026

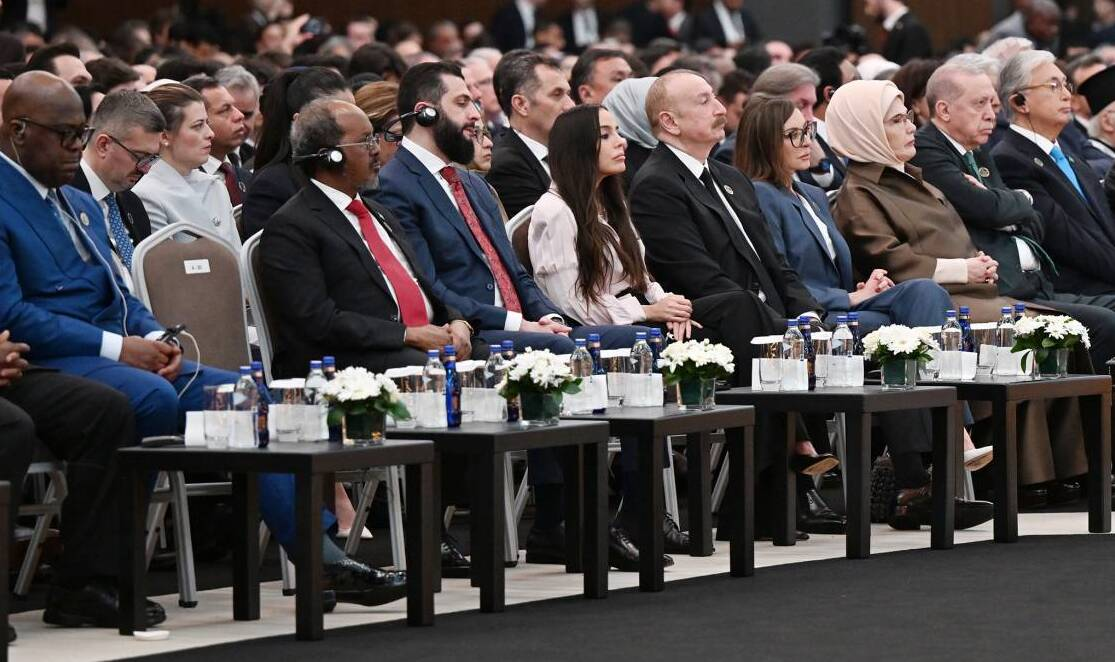
Al-Sharaa at the Antalya Diplomacy Forum with Somali President Hassan Sheikh Mohamud, Azerbaijani President Ilham Aliyev, Turkish President Recep Tayyip Erdoğan, and Kazakh President Kassym-Jomart Tokayev, 17 April 2026

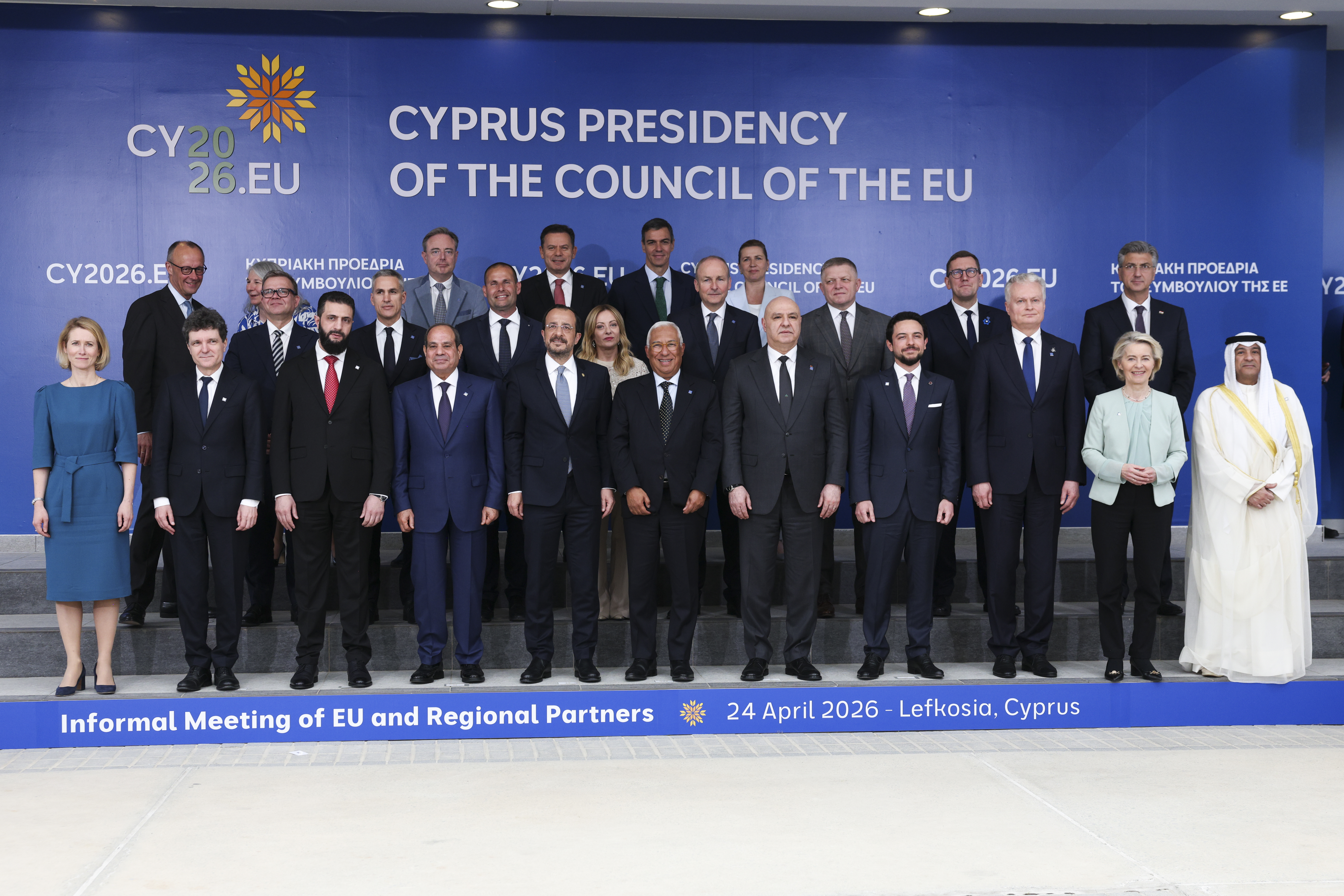
Al-Sharaa attended the informal meeting of the Heads of State or Government of the European Union in Cyprus, 24 April 2026

== Multilateral meetings ==
Multilateral meetings of the following intergovernmental organizations to which Syria is a member or has been invited are scheduled to take place during al-Sharaa's presidency.

Group	Year					
Group	2025	2026	2027	2028	2029	2030
Arab League	4 March (Note: Emergency summits) (Egypt) Cairo	TBA	TBA	TBA	TBA	TBA
Arab League	17 May (Note: Arab summits) (Iraq) Baghdad^{[a]}	TBA	TBA	TBA	TBA	TBA
UNGA	24 September (United States) New York City	TBA	TBA	TBA	TBA	TBA
COP	6–7 November (Brazil) Belém	TBA	TBA	TBA	TBA	TBA
Others	Arab–Islamic extraordinary summit, 15 September (Qatar) Doha	Informal meeting of the European Council summit, 24 April (Cyprus) Nicosia	TBA	TBA	TBA	TBA
Others	Arab–Islamic extraordinary summit, 15 September (Qatar) Doha	52nd G7 summit 15–17 June (France) Évian-les-Bains, Haute-Savoie (Note: On 21 May 2026, Reuters reported that Syria had been invited to participate in the G7 Summit in France as a guest nation and would be represented by President Ahmed al-Sharaa, which would have marked Syria's first participation in a G7 summit since the forum was founded in 1975. The invitation to al-Sharaa was hand-delivered to Syrian Finance Minister Mohammed Yisr Barnieh, who attended the group's financial talks in Paris. However, al-Sharaa ultimately did not attend the summit.)	TBA	TBA	TBA	TBA
██ = Did not attend; ██ = Future event^a Foreign Minister Asaad al-Shaibani attended in the president's place.

== See also ==
- Foreign relations of Syria
- List of international presidential trips made by Bashar al-Assad, his predecessor
