= Mark Stoddart =

Scottish sculptor and furniture designer

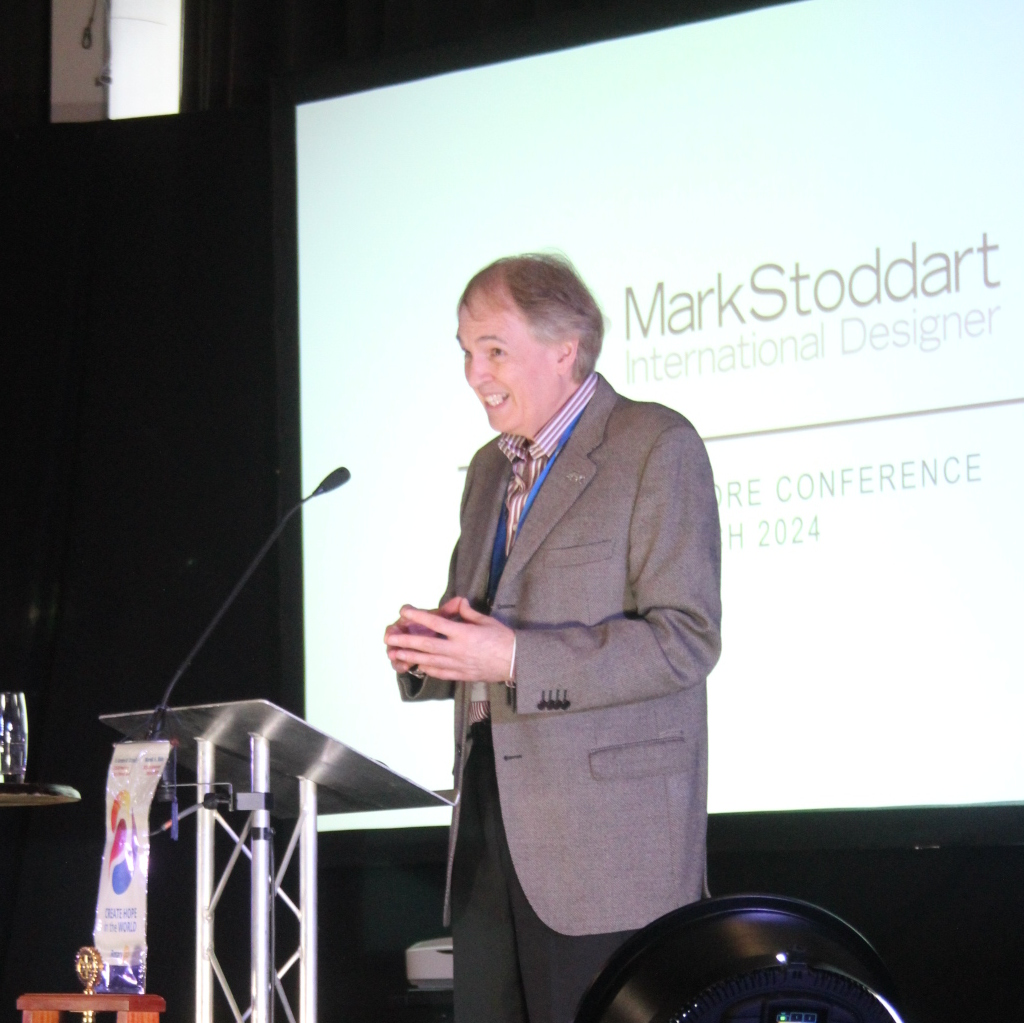
Mark Stoddart at a Rotary conference in 2024

Mark Stoddart (born 1960) is a Scottish sculptor and furniture designer. He is known for his glass topped coffee and dining tables which incorporate bronze sculptures. Having had a difficult schooling until his severe dyslexia was picked up, he has become an ambassador for those affected by the condition.

== Early life ==
Born in 1960 in Troon, he attended various schools until, at the age of twelve, teachers discovered he was dyslexic. He was then sent to Frewen College, a school in Sussex which offered specialised teaching.

== Career ==
After leaving school he returned to Scotland and in 1994 set up his own business, Sculpt Art Creations where he began to produce works inspired by his travels. After some success, Sculpt Art gave way to the company that bears his name today, Mark Stoddart International Designer.

He has produced several table designs which feature a bronze cast sculpture acting as the base, appear to be emerging from the water surface, created by the glass. Some of his designs were made to a limited edition of only 99.

In 2008 Sultan bin Mohammed bin Saud Al Kabeer purchased three tables that had horse-themed designs.

Stoddart produced tables which featured a bronze sculpture of the Apollo Lunar Module as the base and a glass top inscribed with the words spoken by Neil Armstrong as he stepped onto the lunar surface in 1969. One of these tables is kept in the Scottish Parliament, others were purchased by astronomer Sir Patrick Moore and American astronaut Buzz Aldrin.

Other high-profile clients include, Eric Clapton, the jockey Frankie Dettori and Elton John.

In 2014 he retrieved a sculpture after a dispute over ownership with a local hotel.

== Charity connections ==
The 99th piece of his "Walk on the Wildside" table was auctioned in 2007 and the proceeds donated to a wildlife charity. He has donated the sale price of seven works to the David Shepherd Wildlife Foundation.

He has worked as a dyslexia ambassador and his story was included in the book "Dyslexia and Us: A collection of personal stories".

== Personal life ==
Stoddart now lives in Turnberry in Ayrshire. Stoddart owns a Gordon Keeble car, of which only 99 were ever produced.
