= 2025 visit by Ahmed al-Sharaa to the United States =

Official visit by the Syrian President

Official visit by Ahmed al-Sharaa to the United States
- Part of Syria–United States relations
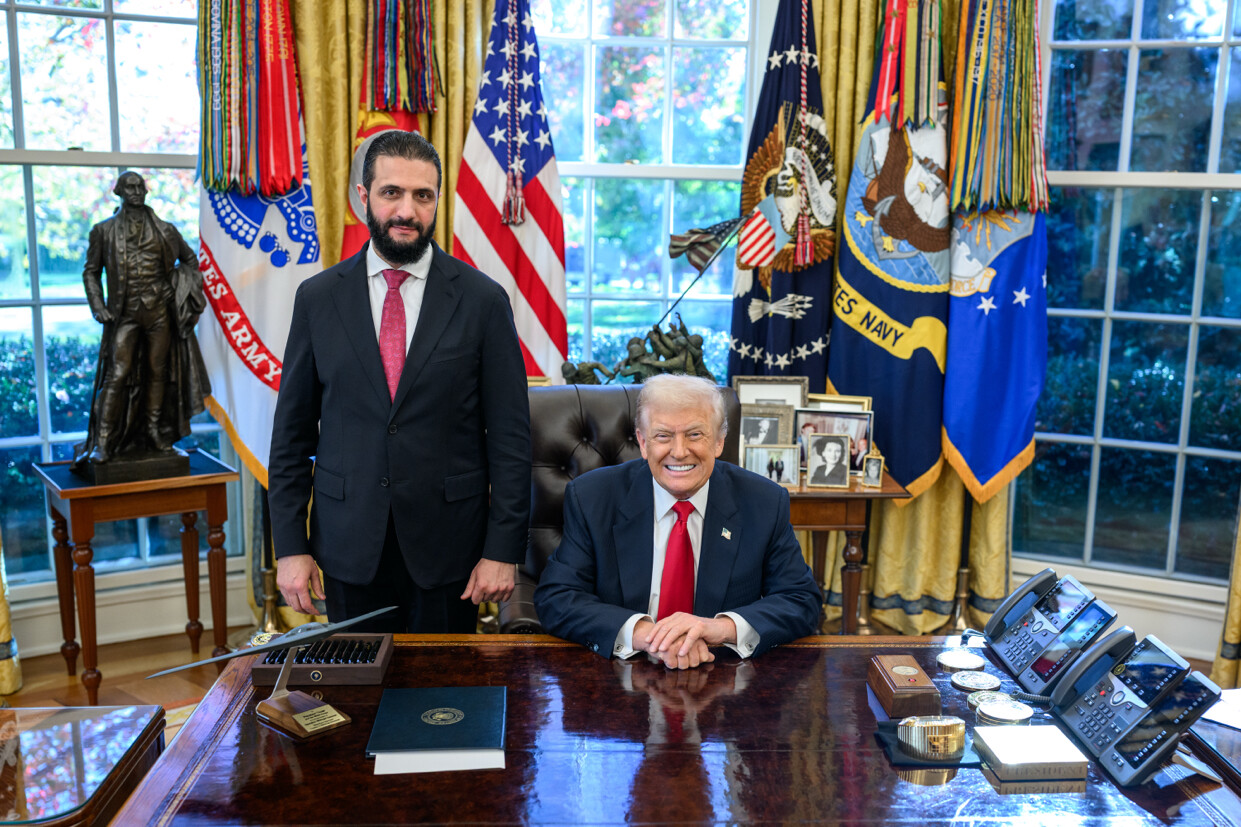
- Al-Sharaa with Donald Trump in the Oval Office
- Date: 8 to 10 November 2025
- Location: Washington, D.C., United States
- Type: Official visit

Ahmed al-Sharaa, the president of Syria, visited the United States from 8 to 10 November 2025. The visit marked the first time a Syrian president had visited the White House since Syria's independence in 1946. It was also his second visit to the United States, following his attendance at the United Nations General Assembly in New York in September 2025, and his 20th foreign trip since his appointment as president of Syria in January 2025. The visit came six months after the two leaders first met in Saudi Arabia during Trump's state visit in May 2025.

Prior to the visit, the United Nations Security Council removed al-Sharaa and Syrian Interior Minister Anas Khattab from its ISIL (Da'esh) and Al-Qaida sanctions list, and on 7 November, the United States delisted them from its Specially Designated Global Terrorist sanctions list, while the United Kingdom also removed them from its consolidated sanctions list, and Syria also formally joined the U.S.-led coalition against the Islamic State.

During the visit, al-Sharaa was not greeted by U.S. President Donald Trump at the White House entrance, a protocol usually observed for foreign leaders. He met with Trump and held a closed-door meeting attended by Vice President JD Vance, Secretary of State Marco Rubio, and other U.S. officials. After the two-hour meeting, al-Sharaa left the White House and entered his motorcade. After the meeting, U.S. Secretary of State Marco Rubio declared a 180-day pause on certain sanctions imposed under the Caesar Syria Civilian Protection Act.

Analysts said al-Sharaa's U.S. visit aimed to boost his legitimacy and secure sanctions relief, giving Syria a chance to end its international isolation and rebuild its economy. They also viewed Trump as a partner in limiting Iranian influence, managing the Iraq–Syria border, and promoting stability between Turkey and Israel, with the U.S. viewing Turkey as a key ally in managing Syria.

== Background ==
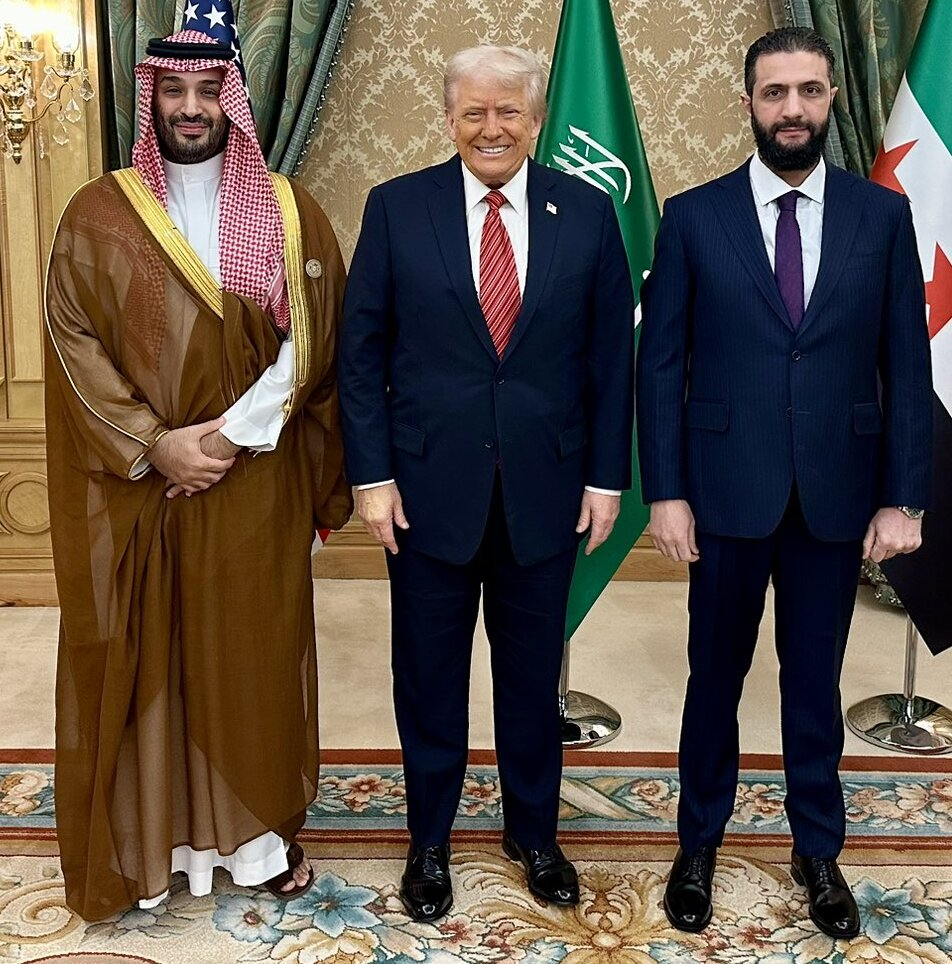
Al-Sharaa with U.S. president Donald Trump and Crown Prince of Saudi Arabia Mohammed bin Salman in Riyadh, Saudi Arabia, 14 May 2025

Before the visit, al-Sharaa met with Donald Trump in Saudi Arabia on 14 May 2025 during Trump's state visit. The meeting marked the first time American and Syrian heads of state had met since Bill Clinton and Hafez al-Assad held talks in Geneva in 2000. Later, on 22 September 2025, al-Sharaa traveled to the United States and visited New York City to attend the 80th session of the United Nations General Assembly. On 24 September, al-Sharaa addressed the general debate of the 80th session of the UN General Assembly, becoming the first Syrian leader to do so since Nureddin al-Atassi in 1967. (Note: Nureddin al-Atassi spoke after the Six-Day War, not during the general debate. Neither Hafez al-Assad nor Bashar al-Assad spoke at the UNGA during their presidencies.) The following day, he met with Marco Rubio, the U.S. Secretary of State, at the Lotte New York Palace Hotel. On the sidelines of the UNGA, al-Sharaa also met separately with Donald Trump and U.S. First Lady Melania Trump. In an exclusive interview with 60 Minutes in September 2025, al-Sharaa said he would like to meet with President Trump again because they "must restore relations in a good and direct way."

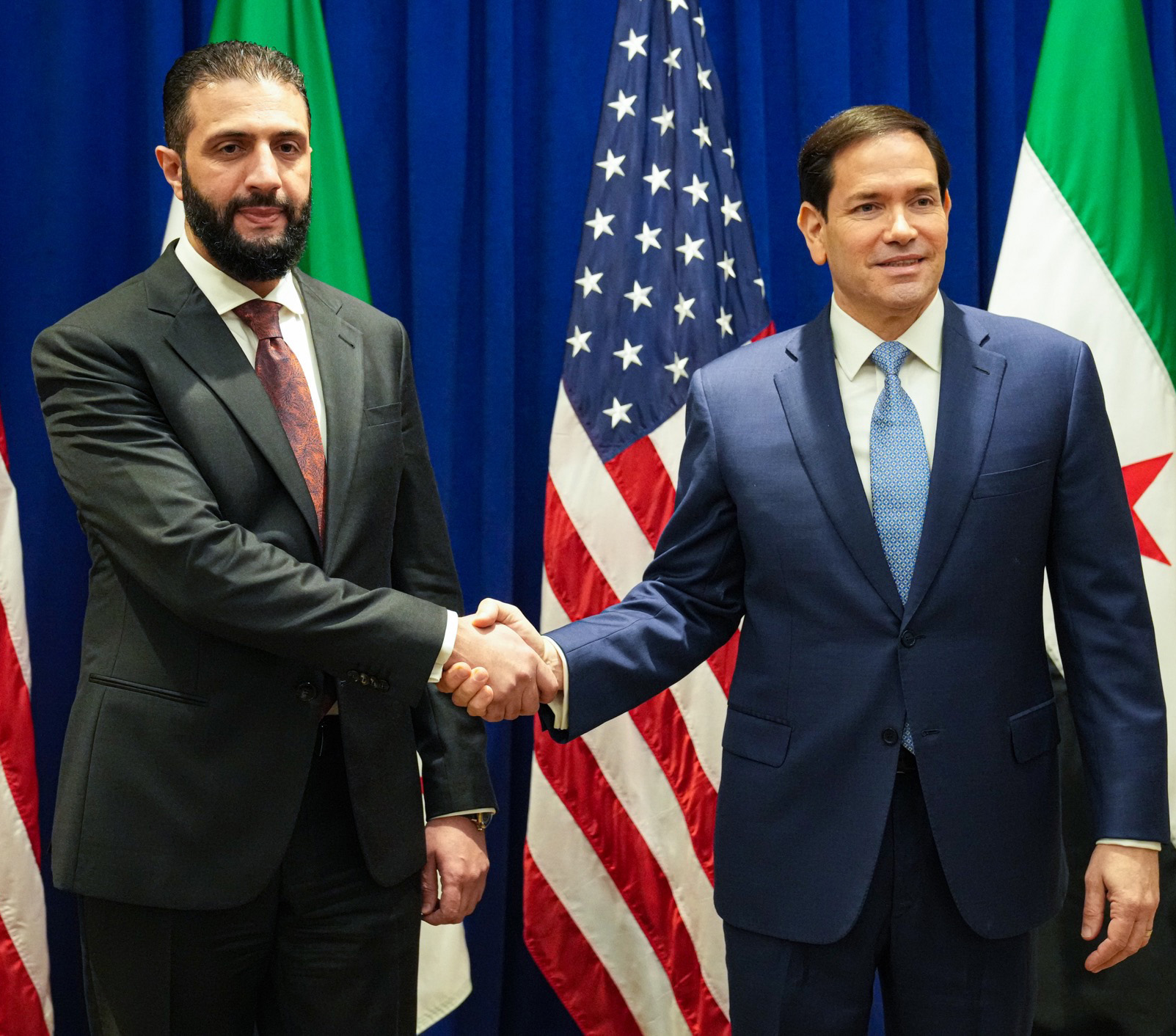
U.S Secretary of State Marco Rubio with Syrian president Ahmed al-Sharaa in New York City on 23 September 2025

On 1 November 2025, U.S. envoy to Syria, Tom Barrack, announced that President al-Sharaa would visit Washington, D.C. on 10 November to meet with U.S. President Donald Trump at the White House. Speaking to reporters on the sidelines of the Manama Dialogue in Bahrain, Barrack said that al-Sharaa was expected to sign a document in Washington with Trump for Syria to join the U.S.-led coalition against the Islamic State. The visit was confirmed by Foreign Minister Asaad al-Shaibani, who stated that it included discussions on Syria's reconstruction. On 4 November 2025, Reuters reported that the United States was preparing to establish a military presence at an airbase in Damascus to help enable a security pact that Washington was brokering between Syria and Israel, citing six sources familiar with the matter. The Syrian Foreign Ministry denied the Reuters report, saying it was "false," the Syrian Arab News Agency reported on 6 November 2025.

On 3 November, White House Press Secretary Karoline Leavitt confirmed that President Trump would meet with al-Sharaa, describing the meeting as part of the administration's diplomatic efforts to promote peace around the world.

On 6 November, before the visit, the United Nations Security Council adopted a resolution to remove al-Sharaa and Syrian Interior Minister Anas Khattab from the sanctions list of the ISIL (Da'esh) and Al-Qaida Sanctions Committee.

On 7 November, the United States delisted both al-Sharaa and Khattab from its Specially Designated Global Terrorist sanctions list, while the United Kingdom announced their removal from its consolidated sanctions list, stating that they were no longer subject to asset freezes. Prior to the visit, Syria formally joined the U.S.-led coalition against the Islamic State, an announcement made by Syrian Information Minister Hamza al-Mustafa and U.S. officials.

== Visit ==
=== 8–9 November ===
On 8 November, President al-Sharaa arrived in the United States on an official visit and met with representatives of Syrian-American organizations in Washington. Syrian Foreign Minister Asaad al-Shaibani also attended the meeting. The President praised the organizations' contributions to raising awareness of Syrian issues and strengthening Syria's presence in American society. He emphasized the importance of their role in supporting national causes and deepening ties with the homeland. He also met with Kristalina Georgieva, Managing Director of the International Monetary Fund, to discuss potential areas of cooperation aimed at supporting Syria's economic development. The meeting was attended by al-Shaibani.

On 9 November, al-Sharaa held an open dialogue with the Syrian community in Washington, D.C., attended by al-Shaibani and U.S. Special Envoy to Syria, Tom Barrack. He highlighted the vital role that Syrians abroad play in staying connected to their homeland and in conveying Syria's true image, praising their efforts and initiatives as expressions of pride and strong attachment to their country.

Trump–Al-Sharaa Oval Office meeting
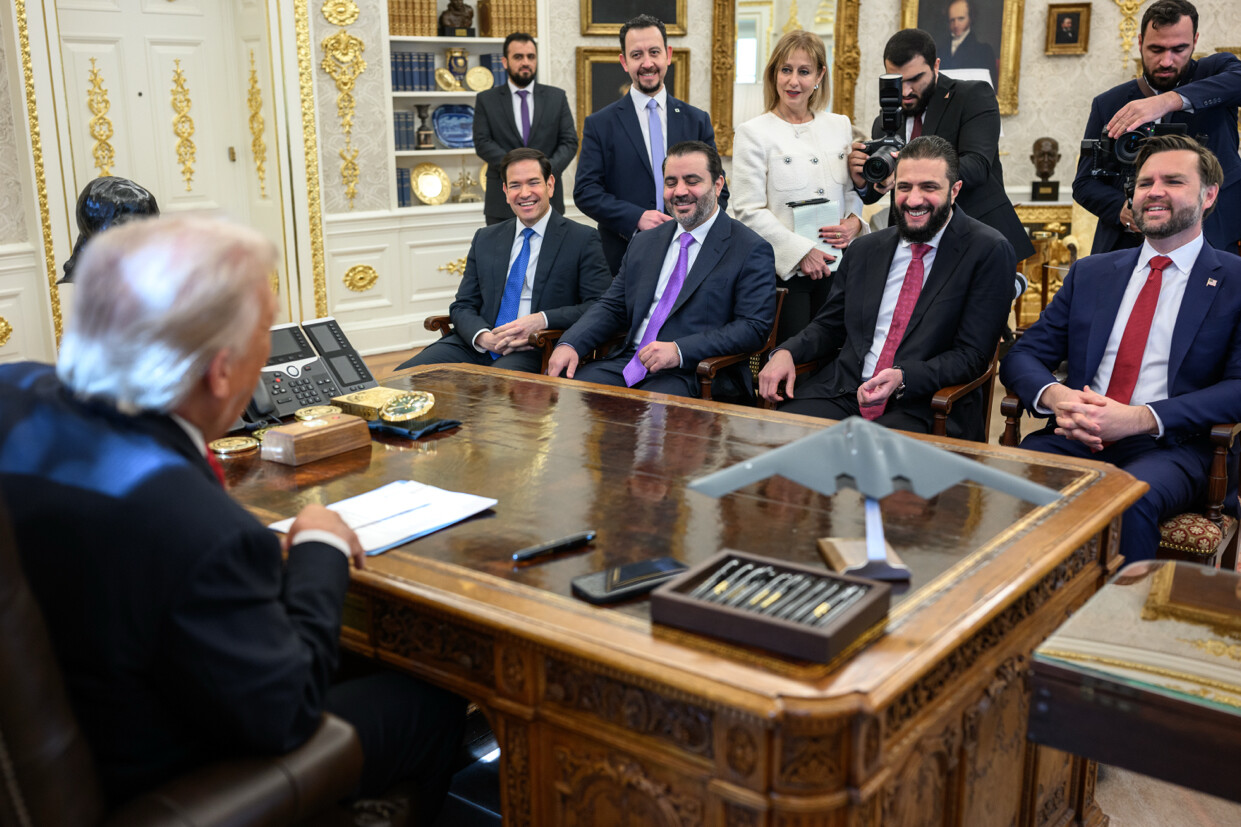
- Al-Sharaa with Marco Rubio, Asaad al-Shaibani, JD Vance, and U.S. President Donald Trump
- Date: 10 November 2025
- Venue: Oval Office, White House
- Location: Washington, D.C., United States

=== 10 November ===
On 10 November, President al-Sharaa entered the building via West Executive Avenue, which was off-limits to reporters, and footage of him was captured behind the steel bars of the dividing fence, adjacent to the White House, instead of the West Wing driveway typically used for other foreign leaders. Al-Sharaa was not greeted by President Trump at the White House entrance, a protocol usually observed for foreign leaders. He then held a closed-door meeting in the Oval Office with President Trump—an unusual move for a U.S. president, who frequently allows cameras and reporters into the Oval Office when meeting foreign leaders—marking the first time a Syrian leader had visited the White House since Syria's independence in 1946. The meeting was attended by al-Shaibani and Syria's UN representative, Ibrahim Olabi, along with U.S. officials, including Vice President JD Vance, Secretary of State Marco Rubio, Barrack, Secretary of Defense Pete Hegseth, and Joint Chiefs Chairman General Dan Caine. Turkey's Foreign Minister Hakan Fidan also joined the meeting for part of the talks, noting that he had been invited 'at a certain point in the meeting.'"

At the Oval Office, Trump gifted al-Sharaa a bottle of his 'Victory' perfume and jokingly asked, "How many wives? One?" to which al-Sharaa replied, "One," and Trump said, "You never know, right?" Al-Sharaa left the White House, waved to supporters outside, and entered his motorcade after the two-hour meeting.

== Aftermath ==
After the visit, in an interview with Fox News, al-Sharaa said, "For the past sixty years, Syria has been isolated from the rest of the world, with relations between Damascus and Washington severed." He added, "We also discussed lifting sanctions during the meeting with Trump, and there was a United Nations Security Council decision to lift sanctions imposed on me and several others." President Donald Trump said on Truth Social about his meeting with al-Sharaa, "We discussed all the intricacies of peace in the Middle East, of which he is a major advocate. I look forward to meeting and speaking again," and added, "Having a stable and successful Syria is very important to all countries in the region."

President Donald Trump spoke to reporters about his meeting with al-Sharaa, 10 November 2025

Several hours after the meeting in the Oval Office, Trump spoke to reporters and praised al-Sharaa as a "strong leader," expressing confidence in him and saying, "We'll do everything we can to make Syria successful."

On 12 November, in an interview with The Washington Post, al-Sharaa stated that his visit to the United States, including meetings with President Donald Trump and members of Congress, aimed to strengthen the partnership between Damascus and Washington, noting that discussions on lifting sanctions had produced positive results.

After the meeting, U.S. Secretary of State Marco Rubio announced a 180-day suspension of certain sanctions under the Caesar Syria Civilian Protection Act.

=== Reactions ===
At the “Make America Healthy Again” summit in Washington, D.C., on 13 November, Vice President JD Vance, speaking alongside Health Secretary Robert F. Kennedy Jr., stated that during the meeting, Trump asked al-Sharaa, “How many wives do you have?” He described the remark as “an amazing question” with “amazing comedic timing,” adding that it was “meta-humor” and that there was “a lot of good humor” within the Cabinet.

On 19 November, speaking at a press conference following his meeting with Crown Prince Mohammed bin Salman at the White House, U.S. President Donald Trump described his recent discussions with Syrian President al-Sharaa as “constructive.” He added that Saudi Crown Prince Mohammed bin Salman and Turkish President Recep Tayyip Erdoğan had both urged him to lift sanctions on Syria to give the country an opportunity to rebuild.

== Analysis ==
=== Regional implications ===
Observers noted that al-Sharaa's visit to the United States aims to strengthen his legitimacy both domestically and internationally, and to seek the lifting of sanctions in exchange for political and economic support that would consolidate his power. The Institute for International Political Studies characterized al-Sharaa's visit to Washington as the culmination of a year of rebranding and public diplomacy.

Senior analysts Aslı Aydıntaşbaş and Dafna H. Randn of the Brookings Institution said that inviting al-Sharaa to the White House was a bold move. It demanded ongoing diplomatic efforts, building institutional capacity, easing sanctions, and sustained support for inclusive governance.

Îlham Ehmed, co-chair of the Syrian Democratic Council, said the Trump meeting was "an opportunity to redefine the position of the new Syrian state." She added that it was also a chance for Trump to address "the rights of the Kurdish people and the coalition partners who fought terrorism on behalf of the world."

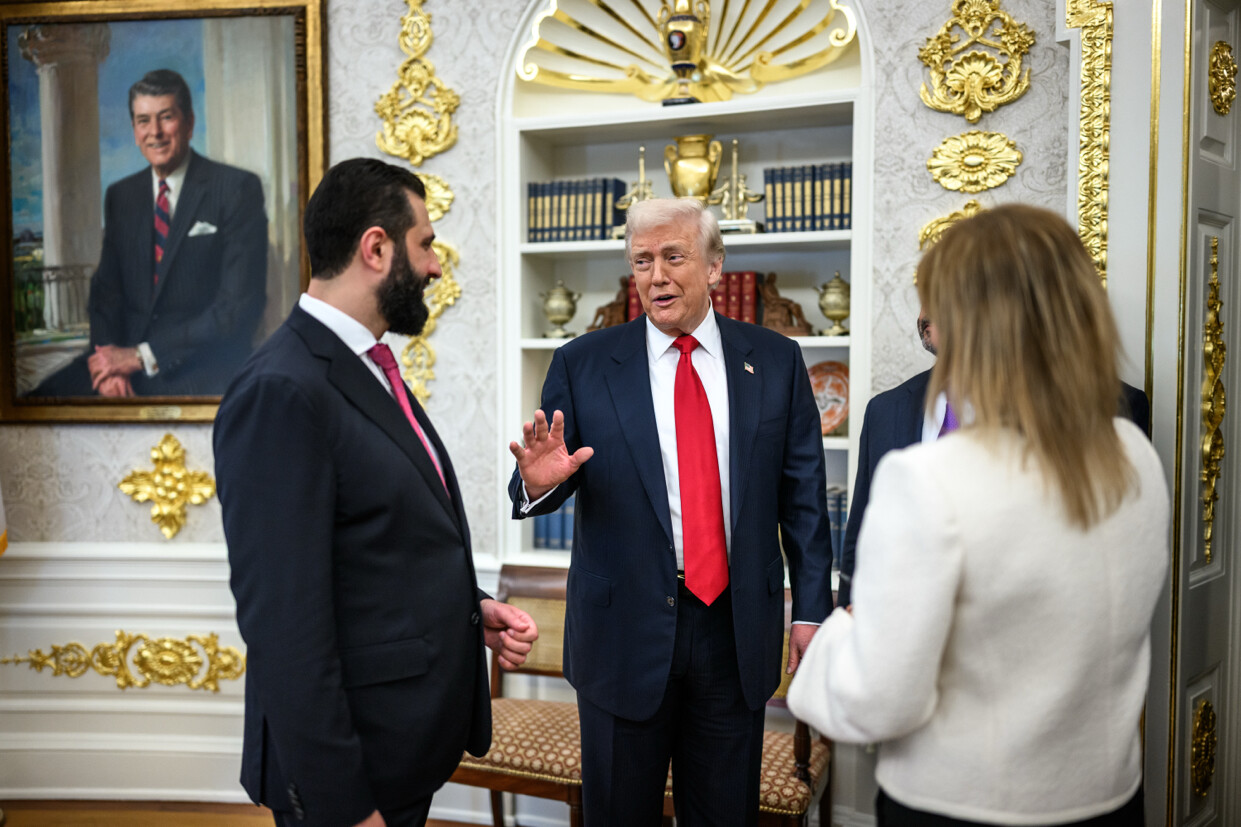
Al-Sharaa with U.S. President Donald Trump at the White House

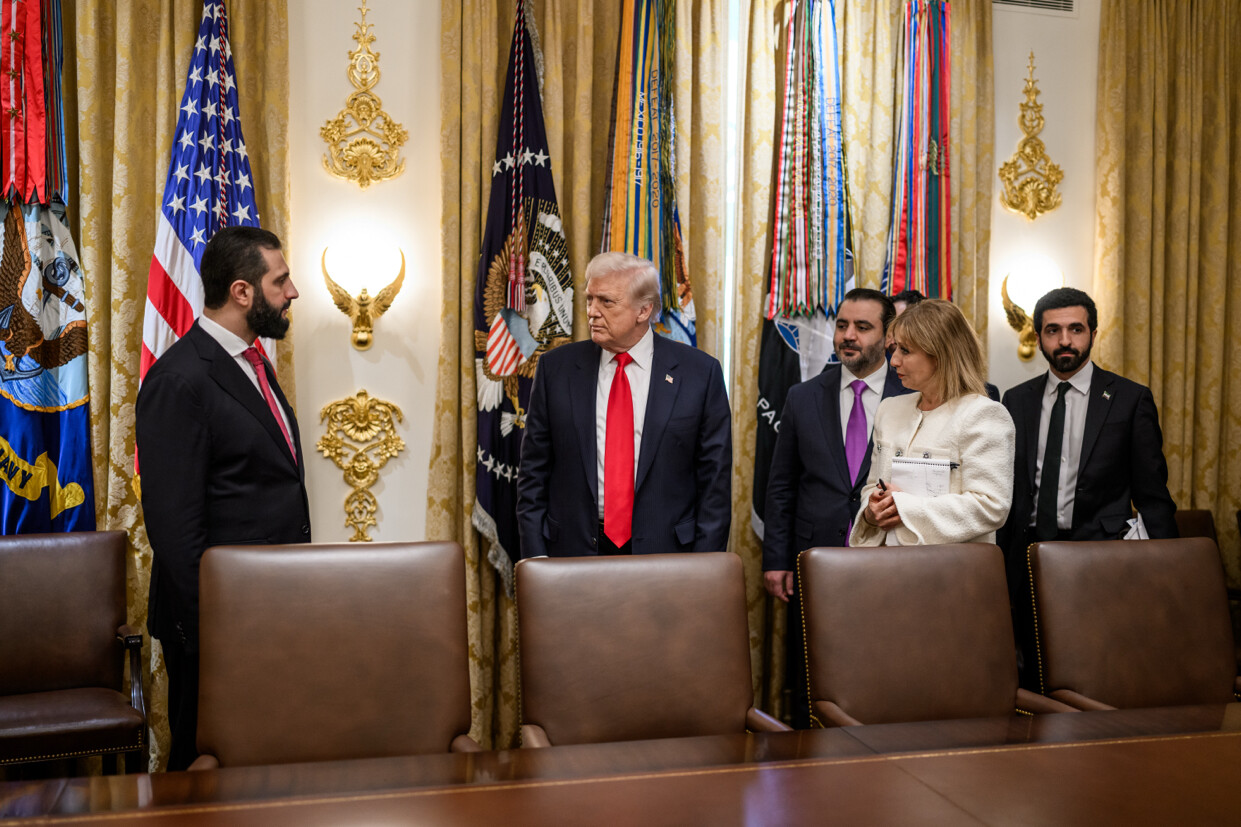
Al-Sharaa, Syria’s UN Ambassador Ibrahim Olabi, and Syrian Foreign Minister Asaad al-Shaibani met with U.S. President Donald Trump at the White House in November 2025.

=== Geopolitical implications ===
Atlantic Council international editor Rich Outzen stated that Syria would remain a key foreign policy priority for Trump, Rubio, Barrack, Cooper, the United States Senate Committee on Foreign Relations, and other officials in Washington. He described Syria as central to Trump's Middle East strategy, noting that developments there could influence counterterrorism efforts, Israel's security, efforts to limit Iranian-backed militias, progress in Gaza, regional trade and development, and humanitarian conditions in Syria and neighbouring countries.

Michael Jacobson of the Washington Institute for Near East Policy stated that al-Sharaa's visit would likely address Syria's designation as a State Sponsor of Terrorism (SST), which it has held since 1979. He noted that although the Trump administration had not confirmed its removal, the step appeared likely because Syria was expected to join the Global Coalition to Defeat the Islamic State, and President Trump had expressed a desire to lift related sanctions to facilitate U.S. assistance in counterterrorism efforts.

Bashar Youssef of Al-Jumhuryah described al-Sharaa's visit as an opportunity for Syria to end its international isolation and begin rebuilding its economy. He added that Washington offered political incentives in exchange for security commitments, viewing Syria as a strategic partner in counterterrorism efforts and in addressing regional threats posed by Iran and other militant groups. He also cautioned that such agreements carried significant risks, including the potential to strengthen authoritarian rule, disregard public demands for democracy and human rights, and provoke violent responses from groups that could lose influence.

Pierre Haski, writing for Worldcrunch, stated that al-Sharaa's visit to Washington marked the consolidation of a new Sunni order in the Middle East, viewing it as inspired by Saudi Arabia and at the expense of Iranian influence. He also noted that the visit placed a limit on the Israeli hegemony that Prime Minister Benjamin Netanyahu had been pursuing following his military successes over the previous two years, representing a turning point in the rapidly transforming "new Middle East."

According to Večernji list, via Eurotopics, Trump regarded al-Sharaa as a strategic partner in advancing U.S. interests in the region, such as limiting Iranian influence, managing the Iraq–Syria border, and promoting stability between Turkey and Israel.

Omer Ozkizilcik stated in Türkiye that Foreign Minister Hakan Fidan's presence at the White House during the Trump–al-Sharaa meeting was deliberate. He said it reflected the Trump administration's approach to Syria and sent a clear message to the region, especially Israel, that the United States considered Turkey a strategic ally and intended to work with it in managing Syria, with the country's future closely tied to Ankara's influence.

Muhittin Ataman, writing in the Daily Sabah, stated that al-Sharaa's visit shifted the balance of power in the Middle East. He noted that the United States aimed to distance Syria from Iran and Russia. He also stated that the Trump administration preferred a Syria aligned more closely with Ankara rather than dependent on Iran and Russia, and that normalization with Syria was expected to reduce Iranian and Russian influence in the region.

== See also ==
- List of international presidential trips made by Ahmed al-Sharaa
- Foreign relations of Syria
- Foreign relations of United States
