= Sultan bin Mohammed Al Kabeer =

Saudi businessman and royal (1954–2024)

- Born: 1954 (age 71–72); Riyadh, Saudi Arabia
- Education: King Saud University
- Occupation: Co-founder of Almarai
- Years active: 1977–2020
- Spouse: Al Jawhara bint Saad bin Abdulaziz Al Saud
- Parent: Mohammed bin Saud Al Kabeer (father)

Sultan bin Mohammed Al Kabeer (born 1954) is a Saudi prince and businessman. He is one of the founders of Almarai which is the largest vertically integrated dairy foods company in the world. Prince Sultan is a great-nephew of King Abdulaziz, being the grandson of the King's sister Noura bint Abdul Rahman.

== Early life ==
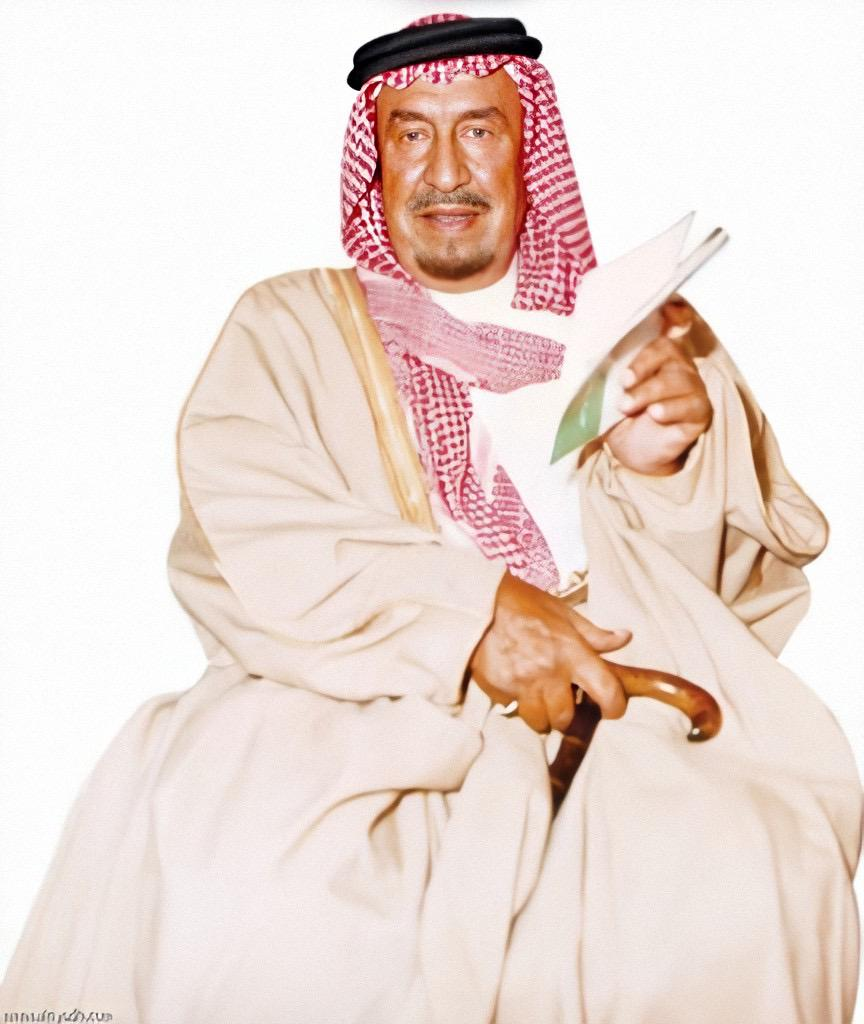
Mohammed bin Saud Al Kabeer, father of Prince Sultan

Prince Sultan belongs to the Al Kabeer branch of the Saudi royal family. This branch is the descendants of Saud bin Faisal bin Turki, Emir of Nejd, who was an uncle of King Abdulaziz, the founder of the present Kingdom of Saudi Arabia. As such, the Al Kabeer family is a cadet branch of the royal family and are not eligible to succeed to the throne. Saud bin Faisal was the great-great-grandfather of Prince Sultan.

Prince Sultan was born in 1954 in Riyadh. His father is Mohammed bin Saud Al Kabeer who was the son of Saud Al Kabeer and Noura bint Abdul Rahman Al Saud, sister of King Abdulaziz.

He was a graduate of King Saud University having a bachelor's degree in commerce and political science.

== Career ==
Prince Sultan founded the dairy company, Almarai, in 1977, and subsequently made it public in 2005 whilst retaining shares of nearly 29%. He also founded Masstock Saudia which was a joint agricultural company with an Irish company in the 1980s. He was the chairman of the board of Arabian shield - Bahrain insurance company and Arabian Union for Cement Industries, and served as vice president and managing director of Yamama Saudi Cement. He was one of the founders of Zain Saudi Telecom, Al Salam Bank (Bahrain), Dana Gas based in UAE.

In March 2020 Prince Sultan resigned from his post as chairman of the board of directors of Almarai Company. He was succeeded by his son Nayef bin Sultan Al Kabeer.

=== Arrest ===
On 4 November 2017, Prince Sultan was arrested but not detained. This was following a corruption crackdown conducted by a new royal anti-corruption committee.

In late December 2017 Prince Sultan's sons Nayef and Saud were detained in Riyadh due to their alleged involvement in a protest over the government's decision to stop paying their utility bills.

== Wealth and influence ==
Prince Sultan was the third person in the Forbes Middle East's billionaire ranking in 2017, and Forbes Magazine estimated his net worth at US$3.8 billion. As of January 2018 it listed him the third richest person in Saudi Arabia. However, in March 2018 he was removed from the list due to the fact that it was not clear whether or not he still had the assets.

Gulf Business listed him as the 38th most powerful Arab in 2019. He was also given as one of the most powerful people in Saudi Arabia in the annual Arabian Business Saudi Power List in 2020.

=== Horse breeding ===
Prince Sultan kept a stud farm outside Riyadh, Nofa Equestrian Resort, where he trained around 100 horses. Total Impact, a racehorse which was imported by Sultan from Chile and trained by Laura de Seroux, won the grade-1 Hollywood Gold Cup in 2004. In 2015 Prince Sultan bought Spring At Last, a grade-1 winning race horse.
