= Marwan al-Halabi =

Syrian politician and medical expert (born 1964)

- مروان الحلبي

Minister of Higher Education and Scientific Research
- Incumbent
- Assumed office 29 March 2025
- President: Ahmed al-Sharaa
- Preceded by: Abdel Moneim Abdel Hafez

Personal details
- Born: Marwan Jamil al-Halabi; 1964 (age 61–62) Quneitra Governorate, Syria
- Party: Independent
- Education: Damascus University (MS); University of Franche-Comté (PhD)

Marwan Jamil al-Halabi (Arabic: مروان جميل الحلبي; born 1964) is a Syrian politician, gynecologist and academic who has served as Minister of Higher Education and Scientific Research in the Syrian transitional government since 29 March 2025.

Widely regarded as one of the country’s leading medical experts, al-Halabi has an extensive background in medicine, with a specialization in obstetrics, gynecology, and reproductive biology.

== Early life and education ==
Al-Halabi was born in 1964 in Quneitra Governorate, in southwestern Syria.

He has earned several degrees in the medical field over the course of his career. He received his Doctor of Medicine (MD) degree from Damascus University in 1987, followed by the Syrian Board certification in Obstetrics and Gynecology from the Ministry of Health in 1990. In 1991, he completed a Master of Science in Obstetrics and Gynecology at the University of Damascus.

Al-Halabi pursued further training in France, where he obtained a University Diploma in Modern Obstetrics Techniques from the University of Franche-Comté in 1996, as well as a University Diploma in Applied Biology of Fertilization from the same university that year. He later received an Advanced Specialized Certificate in Obstetrics and Gynecology from Claude Bernard University in 1997 and an Advanced Specialized Certificate in Fertility Medicine from the University of Franche-Comté in 1998. In 1999, he earned a University Diploma in Laparoscopic Surgery for Infertility from Claude Bernard University.

== Scientific activities ==
Al-Halabi has made significant contributions to the field of reproductive medicine. He has published more than 50 research articles in peer-reviewed medical journals focusing on fertility and is the author of five textbooks on embryology and reproductive biology. In addition, he has presented over 100 scientific papers at global, regional, and local medical conferences. Al-Halabi has worked as a professor and supervised numerous doctoral and master’s theses in the fields of human medicine, pharmacy, and the sciences at Damascus University. His work has earned him several local and regional medical awards.

Al-Halabi was also the first Syrian researcher and lecturer to participate in international fertility associations, including the International Federation of Fertility Societies (IFFS), the European Society of Human Reproduction and Embryology (ESHRE), the American Society for Reproductive Medicine (ASRM), and the Middle East Fertility Society (MEFS).

== Career ==
Al-Halabi has held several positions in the field of medicine. He served as Vice Dean of the Faculty of Medicine at Damascus University for Academic Affairs in 2020. He has also been President of the Syrian Society of Obstetricians and Gynecologists and President of the Arab Federation of Obstetrics and Gynecology Societies. In addition, he served as Medical Director of the Fertility Unit at Orient Hospital in Damascus.

On 29 March 2025, al-Halabi was appointed as the minister of higher education in the Syrian transitional government.
