= 2025 Arab–Islamic extraordinary summit =

International meeting in Doha, Qatar

- Host country: Qatar
- Date: 15 September 2025
- City: Doha
- Participants: Arab and Islamic countries (members of the Arab League and the Organization of Islamic Cooperation)
- Chair: Emir of Qatar, Sheikh Tamim bin Hamad Al-Thani (or Qatari leadership)
- Follows: 2024 Arab–Islamic extraordinary summit

The 2025 Arab–Islamic extraordinary summit was an international meeting held between the Arab League and the Organization of Islamic Cooperation on 15 September 2025, in Doha, the capital of Qatar. The urgent meeting was prompted by the Israeli airstrike on Hamas leadership in Qatar.

== Background ==
On September 9, 2025, Israel carried out an airstrike targeting a meeting of Hamas political figures in Doha, which led to the death of five Hamas members and a Qatari officer. The meeting was taking place in the context of US-brokered ceasefire efforts. Reports show that the attack failed in killing senior Hamas leadership. Qatar called the attack a violation of its sovereignty and international norms, calling it "state terrorism" and accusing Israel of deliberately undermining ongoing peace/hostage talks. Netanyahu warned that Qatar must either expel Hamas officials or bring them to justice or face further consequences.

Gulf Cooperation Council (GCC) member states have voiced concerns regarding the reliability of the United States as a long-term security partner. Despite decades of cooperation and substantial defense agreements worth billions of dollars, the U.S. failure to detect or prevent the Israeli strike on Qatari territory has raised serious questions about its role in safeguarding Gulf security. In light of this, regional leaders are reassessing their strategic alignments, with some initiating quiet engagement with alternative partners such as China. There is growing sentiment that the United States is risking long-standing and high-value regional partnerships by prioritizing its alignment with Israel—a significantly smaller actor in the region—at the potential expense of broader Gulf security interests.

Several Gulf leaders, including the UAE president, Mohamed bin Zayed Al Nahyan, had already visited Doha in the days immediately following the strike. Qatar's prime minister had travelled to Washington after the strike and held a meeting with the U.S. president, Donald Trump.

== Plans and preparation ==
The emergency Arab-Islamic summit in Doha was organized to address the Israeli strike on Qatar as a violation of a GCC country's sovereignty, with one anticipated topic being a reduction of American influence in the region following failed safety guarantees by the United States. The reported agenda included exploring alternative defense partnerships with China and Turkey, considering the partial removal of U.S. troops in favor of other safety guarantors and security partners, and reviewing the potential cancellation of multi-billion-dollar American arms deals due to security and reliability concerns.

According to Al-Quds Al-Arabi, their presence signaled growing interest in alternative security partnerships and deepening frustration with the United States, which many participants began to view as an unreliable security partner after its failure to prevent the Israeli breach of Qatari airspace.

A preparatory meeting of Arab and Islamic foreign ministers took place on 14 September to finalise a draft statement on the Israeli attack. The draft statement condemned the Israeli airstrike on Qatar and, in reference to the Gaza war and Israeli policies regarding the West Bank, denounced Israeli actions—described as genocide, ethnic cleansing, starvation, siege, and settlement expansion—stating they threatened regional peace and the normalization process.

== Summit ==
Tamim bin Hamad Al Thani, Emir of Qatar, opened the summit, repeating Qatar's condemnation of the Israeli attack, restating Qatar's role of a mediator, and asserting that the Gaza war "has turned into a genocide". Hissein Brahim Taha, Secretary-General of the Organisation of Islamic Cooperation, urged a unified and firm stance and recommended the participants take "firm decisions". Ahmed Aboul Gheit, Secretary-General of the Arab League, labelled Israel a rogue state and said silence over its actions enables further violations. Abdullah II, King of Jordan said the strike showed that the threat coming from Israel is "without limits" and called for a deterring response. Mohammed Shia' Al Sudani, Prime Minister of Iraq, proposed a NATO-style defense pact for Arab and Islamic states, in addition to forming "a joint Arab-Islamic committee to convey our position to the Security Council and international bodies". Abdel Fattah el-Sisi, President of Egypt, said Israel's actions had "gone beyond diplomatic and military logic" and crossed "all red lines". Recep Tayyip Erdoğan, President of Turkey, said that there is a "greedy, bloodthirsty mentality among Israeli officials", and called for accountability through international law. Mahmoud Abbas, President of the State of Palestine and Palestinian National Authority, called for holding Israel accountable, ending the Gaza war, halting land expropriation in the West Bank, and securing Israeli withdrawal to the 1967 borders. Masoud Pezeshkian, President of Iran, said Israeli attacks on Qatar, Iran, and other states were deliberate, rooted in impunity, and enabled by weak international condemnation. He urged Muslim unity as one body, grounded in shared human values in addition to Islam. Pakistan's prime minister, Shehbaz Sharif called on the United Nations to suspend Israel and proposed the creation of an "Arab‑Islamic task force". Malaysia's prime minister, Anwar Ibrahim argued that symbolic gestures were insufficient. Ahmed al-Sharaa, President of Syria, said that it is rare for a negotiator or mediator to be targeted, calling it a dangerous precedent, while also condemning Israel's ongoing attacks on Gaza and Syria for the past nine months.

The summit exhibited a unified front in support of Qatar and censure of Israel's strike. The dominant through‑lines were the need for enforceable measures to halt further violations of international law and references to the Gaza humanitarian crisis.

== Outcome ==
No immediate political or economic measures were announced at the conclusion of the one-day summit. The final communique condemned "Israel's repeated threats of the possibility of targeting Qatar again", reiterating the countries' and organizations' condemnation of the attack and solidarity with Qatar. Separately from this, Qatar's foreign ministry spokesperson Majed al-Ansari said that the GCC's consultations aimed at strengthening collective deterrence were ongoing, with a session of the GCC Unified Military Command scheduled to convene in Doha.

== See also ==
- 2023 Arab–Islamic extraordinary summit
