= Nayef bin Sultan Al Kabeer =

Saudi businessman and royal

- Born: 29 January 1975 (age 51)
- Education: King Saud University
- Occupation: Chairman of Almarai

Nayef bin Sultan Al Kabeer (born 29 January 1975) is a Saudi businessman who has been the chairman of the board of directors of Almarai Company since March 2020 when his father Sultan bin Mohammed resigned from the post. Nayef bin Sultan is a member of the Al Kabeer cadet branch of the Saudi royal family.

== Biography ==
Nayef was born on 29 January 1975. He is the grandson of Mohammed bin Saud Al Kabeer and great-grandson of Saud Al Kabeer. He received a bachelor's degree in business administration from King Saud University in 1998. Prince Nayef is the chairman and a member in the boards of various companies, including Almarai, Zain Saudi, Al Yamamah Cement Company, Farabi Gulf Petrochemicals Company, the Arabian Shield Insurance Company, Tarabot Investment and Development and the Global Co. for Downstream Industries.

Prince Nayef was named the chairman of Zain Saudi, a telecommunications company, in October 2015, replacing Farhan bin Nayef Al Jarbaa in the post.

On 4 January 2018 Prince Nayef, his brother Prince Saud and other members of the Al Kabeer family were detained due to their protest over the cancellation of the state payment of their water and electricity bills and over the execution of their cousin Prince Turki bin Saud Al Kabeer, in 2016. They were released one week later.
