= Almarai =

Multinational food company of Saudi Arabia

Almarai Company
- Logo in use since 2010
- Native name: شركة المراعي
- Type: Public
- Traded as: Tadawul: 2280
- ISIN: SA000A0ETHT1
- Industry: Food processing
- Founded: July 1, 1977; 49 years ago
- Founders: Sultan bin Mohammed bin Saud Al Kabeer; Alastair McGuckian; Paddy McGuckian
- Headquarters: Riyadh, Saudi Arabia; 24.785614°N 46.707441°E
- Areas served: GCC Countries; Egypt; Jordan
- Key people: Nayef bin Sultan Al Kabeer (Chairman); Fawaz Al-Jasser (CEO)
- Products: Dairy, yogurt, juices, bakeries, poultry and infant formula
- Revenue: ▲US$5.22 billion (2023)
- Operating income: ▲US$718.37 million (2023)
- Net income: ▲US$547.07 million (2023)
- Total assets: ▲US$9.65 billion (2023)
- Total equity: ▲US$4.75 billion (2023)
- Owners: Savola (34.52%); Sultan bin Mohammed bin Saud Al Kabeer (23.69%); PIF through SALIC (16.32%)
- Subsidiaries: 7 Days, L'usine, Alyoum, Farm's Select, Almarai Refresh, One Bean, Ice Leaf, Nuralac, Evolac, Almira, Seama
- Website: www.almarai.com

Almarai Company (Arabic: شركة المراعي, lit. 'The Pasture') is a Saudi multinational dairy company listed on the Tadawul stock exchange.

It specializes in food and beverage manufacturing, including distribution. The company's main offices are located in Riyadh, Saudi Arabia.

== History ==
=== Early years (1977–2010) ===
Almarai started its operations in 1977 by Irish brothers Alastair McGuckian, Paddy McGuckian, and Prince Sultan bin Mohammed bin Saud Al Kabeer. During the early years of the company's history, there was little infrastructure for the production and sale of milk in the Kingdom of Saudi Arabia. Prince Sultan recognized that the area and the wider Middle East could benefit from higher quality milk production and logistics. Almarai set up a number of facilities in regions across Saudi Arabia, which initially helped local farmers produce and distribute milk.

During the early 1990s, Almarai entered a period of restructuring and reinvestment, centralizing its structure. Five decentralized processing plants were replaced with a central processing plant. Ten small dairy farms that were scattered across Saudi Arabia were replaced with four large dairy farms in Al Kharj in the central region.

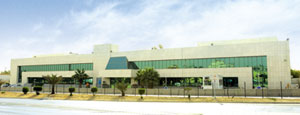
Almarai Head Office in Riyadh, Saudi Arabia

Savola owns a quarter of its shares and the rest has been on the market since 2006. In 2005, Almarai entered a new phase, transformed from a company with limited liability to a joint-stock company. The move was part of the company's IPO, as they floated 30% of the company shares on the Saudi Arabian stock market, the Tadawul. All shareholders, including The Savola Group, diluted their shares for the IPO to take place. However exact figures were never revealed how the 30% of shares were divided.

In 2006, Almarai began to diversify its portfolio by pushing promotions on other dairy products and not just milk. It held a cheddar cheese product promotion throughout the Middle East to try and increase the number of households that bought the cheese on a regular basis. At the beginning of 2007, Almarai signed a memorandum of understanding with the authorized partners in Western Bakeries Company Limited, to acquire up to 100% ownership of these companies. And then raise the capital of the company to (1.090) million Saudi riyals. The current capital is SR 8 billion.

In 2009, Almarai and PepsiCo announced that they would be forming a joint venture, International Dairy and Juice Limited, known as IDJ. They then announced that they would be acquiring Egypt's International Company for Agro-Industrial Projects (Beyti). The company specializes in dairy and juice products, including plain and flavored ultra-high-temperature (UHT) milk, flavored yogurt, cheese and a variety of juices. The brand name was known throughout Egypt and continued to operate under its name as a subsidiary of the IDJ joint venture. During that year, Almarai also moved into the poultry market. This was following the acquisition of Hail Agricultural Development Co. The lucrative poultry business was purchased for $253.2 million in cash and stock to complete the takeover.

As part of the PepsiCo partnership, Almarai also moved into the Jordanian drinks market. IDJ acquired a 75% stake in Teeba, a leading Jordanian dairy producer. This helped strengthen Almarai's presence in the country's dairy market, and Pepsi used the acquisition to launch Tropicana orange juice drinks into the Jordanian market.

The expansion and growth of the dairy producer continued into 2010, when it was announced they planned on expanding its operations into Pakistan. The likelihood was that Almarai would invest in the country's dairy market through acquisition.

=== Recent history (2011–present) ===
Almarai announced in 2011 that they would be investing heavily in Saudi Arabia to increase dairy production in the country. Arab News reported that they would be creating an additional 12,000 jobs in the country over the next five years. The joint venture with Pepsi continued to grow, when Reuters announced that both companies would invest a total of $345 million in Egypt's agriculture industry. It was seen as a positive move in the country, following 3 years of economic turmoil following the 2011 revolution in the country. During the same year, they also made an announcement that they would be acquiring Fondomonte, a large farming company based in Argentina.

By 2014, the company controlled 44% of the dairy market in the Persian Gulf region.

Between 2006 and 2016, the company grew rapidly. It was announced that their total staffing numbers had reached 38,000, which means the company created over thirty thousand jobs in a decade. Later in 2016, Almarai announced that it would be acquiring land in the United States to expand its farming operations. The land would be purchased in a number of locations, predominantly in California for its farm-friendly water laws, acquiring in total around 14,000 acres. In 2017, it was announced that Savola would reduce its stake in Almarai by 2%.

The Kingdom's sovereign wealth fund announced in late 2017 that they would be acquiring a large share in Almarai, increasing their share to 16.32%. Bloomberg valued their investment at $2.4 billion. It was said to be a move by the Saudi Arabian wealth fund to diversify its portfolio away from oil investments. The move proved to be positive with investors, as the shares rose 4% following the announcement.

In 2018, it was announced that Almarai was the most popular brand in the Kingdom of Saudi Arabia for the third year in a row. This was according to a poll carried out by the British market research company, YouGov. Later that year, it was announced that Almarai announced plans to invest $2.8 billion in Middle Eastern production facilities. Between 2019 and 2023, Almarai was said to be focusing on the production facilities at farms in the region, but also its distribution and transportation in the region, so it would be easier to expand geographically throughout the Middle East.

In March 2021, Almarai agreed to buy the UAE and Bahrain operations of Bakemart for $25.5 million.

In 2023, Almarai fully acquired IDJ for $68 million.

Almarai was the first dairy farm in Saudi Arabia to be accredited with ISO 22000. Almarai also received the ISO 9001:2000 across all its operating divisions (farming, procurement, processing, technical research and development, distribution and supply chain).

Almarai was ranked 43rd on Forbes Middle East's Top 100 Listed Companies 2025 list.

== Facilities and sustainability ==
In June 2012, Almarai invited a number of representatives from both the International press and also financial leaders to visit their main facility in Saudi Arabia, located in Al Kharj. The facility is around 60 miles from the Saudi capital of Riyadh.

The Al Kharj facility includes dairy and juice processing operations, along with a bakery facility. It also has the region's first infant nutrition factory. CNN reported on the innovative technology used at the Al Kharj facility, with each cow needing an estimated 300 liters (66 imp gal; 79 U.S. gal) of water each day in the middle of the Saudi Arabian desert, the company uses a method known as the Californian model to run huge dairy productions in some of the driest regions across the globe. The facility can automate temperatures from above 50 °C (122 °F) down to 21–23 °C (70–73 °F) all year round. The milk it produces serves over 55,000 stores in the Persian Gulf region. In 2017, Almarai added a second production facility in Al Kharj, known as CPP3. It is home to a bakery, infant nutrition plant, central processing plant, and a logistics warehouse.
