= Proclamation of the Kingdom of Saudi Arabia =

Official founding of Saudi Arabia

- Part of Unification of Saudi Arabia
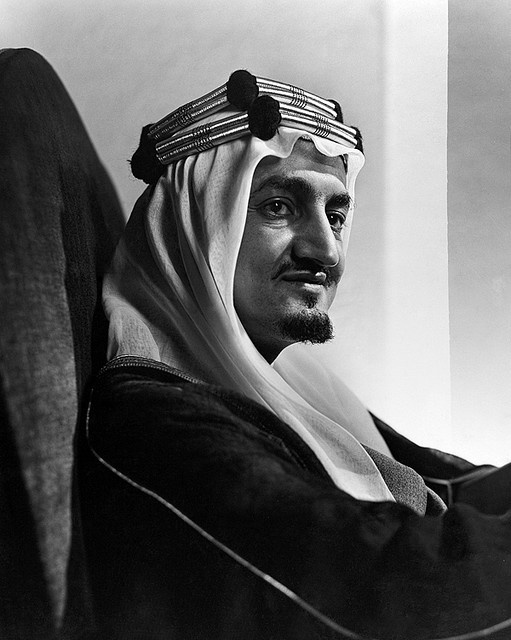
- Prince Faisal in 1942, who announced the unification in 1932 on Ibn Saud's behalf and would later himself become the king in 1964
- Native name: إعلان توحيد المملكة العربية السعودية
- Date: 23 September 1932; 94 years ago
- Venue: Al Hamidiyah Palace
- Location: Mecca, Kingdom of Hejaz and Nejd → Kingdom of Saudi Arabia
- Participants: Ibn Saud; Faisal bin Abdulaziz; Fuad Hamza; Abdullah al-Fadl

Flag of Saudi Arabia, 1932–1934

The Declaration of the Unification of Saudi Arabia (Arabic: إعلان توحيد المملكة العربية السعودية, romanized: Īʿlān Taūḥīd Al-Mamlakah al-ʿArabīyah as-Suʿūdīyah) was officially announced by Prince Faisal bin Abdulaziz, the Viceroy of Hejaz and future monarch on behalf of King Abdulaziz ibn Saud on September 23, 1932 (corresponding to 21 Jumada al-Ula 1351 Hijri), at 9:00 am from al-Hamidiyah Palace in Mecca. Faisal read out the Royal Decree No. 2716 issued by Abdulaziz ibn Saud on September 18, 1932, that renamed the Kingdom of Hejaz and Nejd and its annexes as the Kingdom of Saudi Arabia.

The declaration marked the establishment of the fifth and final iteration of the Third Saudi State as well as the formal culmination of Abdulaziz's nearly thirty-years of political and military campaign to unite the Arabian Peninsula under a single unitary traditionalist Islamic polity. 23 September is commemorated annually by the Saudi National Day (al-Yawm al-Waṭanī), a national holiday established in 2007 on the occasion of the 75th anniversary.

In 1934, nearly two years after the country's proclamation, Saudi Arabia and North Yemen went to war with each other over the territorial claims of al-Hudaydah, Jizan, Asir and Najran. The war ended with swift Saudi victory where Jizan, Asir and Najran came under Riyadh's jurisdiction and a Treaty of Taif was signed between Ibn Saud and Yahya Hamid ed-Din that guaranteed 20 years of peace between the two neighboring states. The war was the last battle for the unification of Saudi Arabia and the borders of the country remained mostly unchanged up until the Buraimi crisis.

== Historical background ==
The debellation of the Second Saudi State occurred in 1891 following the defeat of the House of Saud at the hands of the Rashidis in the Battle of Mulayda. Its last emir, Abdul Rahman bin Faisal al-Saud, alongside his family, fled to the deserts of Rub' al Khali from where he was granted asylum by the ruling al-Khalifa family of Bahrain and lastly by the al-Sabah family of Kuwait when the Ottomans allowed him to settle.

=== Emirate of Riyadh (1902–1913) ===
In November 1901, Ibn Saud, the son of the exiled emir of Nejd Abdul Rahman al-Saud, embarked on a raiding spree into Nejd where he began targeting tribes associated with the Rashidis in an attempt to avenge his father's exile. Within months, he was able to capture Riyadh in January 1902 and subsequently establish the Emirate of Riyadh. Although out of power in Riyadh, Rashidis were still bastioned in their ancestral homeland of Ha'il and elsewhere in northern Arabia in the territories of the pro-Ottoman Emirate of Jabal Shammar and frequently engaged with Ibn Saud's forces during the unification wars.

Ibn Saud's victory in 1902 paved the way for the emergence of a new puritanical irregular Wahhabi religious militia mostly composed of nomadic tribesmen, known as the Ikhwan (transl. the brethren). The Ikhwan formed a crucial part of Ibn Saud's bedouin army and supported much of his expansionist campaigns after the Battle of Riyadh.

=== Emirate of Nejd and Hasa (1913–1921) ===
In 1913, Ibn Saud captured the region of al-Hasa in Eastern Arabia from the Ottomans. He subsequently incorporated al-Hasa into the Emirate of Riyadh before renaming of the latter into the Emirate of Nejd and Hasa. Ibn Saud signed the Treaty of Darin with Percy Cox in 1915 that somewhat attempted to define the emirate's boundaries. The aim of the treaty was make Ibn Saud agree not to attack the British protectorates of Kuwait, Qatar and the Trucial States.

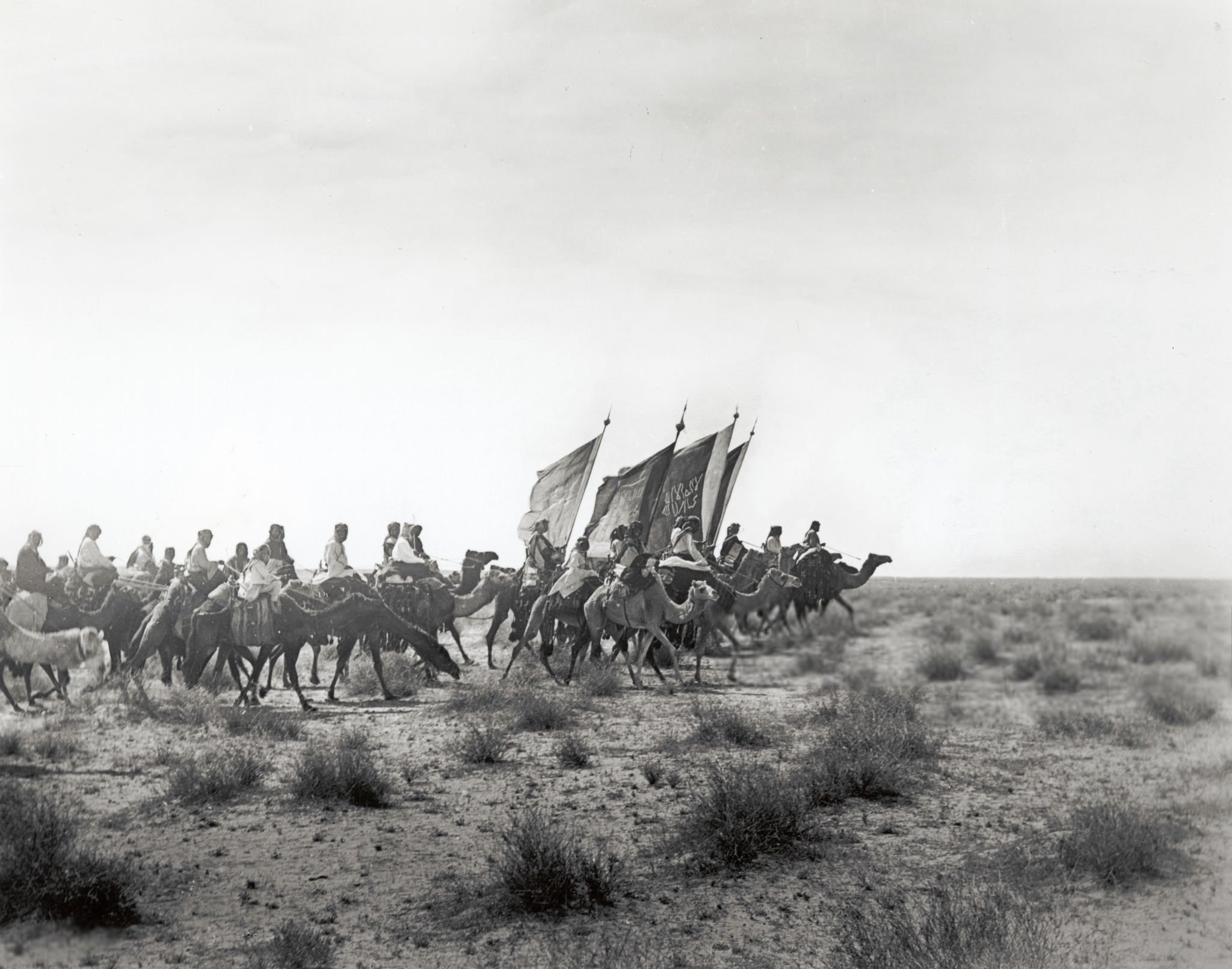
The Ikhwan (c. 1910)

In the outbreak of World War I, Sharif of Mecca Hussein bin Ali declared the Great Arab Revolt against the Ottoman Empire, thereby seceding from the latter and establishing the Kingdom of Hejaz besides joining the side of the Allied forces. He subsequently declared himself as the "King of the Arabs", a move which infuriated Ibn Saud alongside his Western allies. Ibn Saud began demanding negotiations to consider the borders between Hejaz and Nejd. Hussein rejected the demands and insulted Ibn Saud instead which led to the first clashes between the two in the al-Khurma dispute between 1918 and 1919. The war resulted in the defeat of the Hashemites and the capture of al-Khurma by the Ikhwan, however, the British intervention established a ceasefire between the two and averted the immediate collapse of the Hashemite kingdom.

In 1920, following the end of World War I, the Ikhwan engaged with the Kuwaiti forces in the battles of Hamdh and Jahra after Salim al-Sabah demonstrated intentions of building a commercial city in the south of Kuwait, which was now close to the territory of Emirate of Nejd and Hasa. Ibn Saud abandoned his desire to annex Kuwait after a British military intervention on the latter's side that resulted in a huge defeat to the Saudis.

On the northern front, the Ikhwan began plundering Transjordan and massacring villages that came under their sway. The raids posed a serious threat to the throne of Emir Abdullah, who was almost powerless in repelling those incursions. The British then stationed troops and began maintaining a small air force near Amman in order to safeguard its protectorate. The British RAF intercepted the incursions and posed a huge obstacle to the Ikhwan up until 1924 when the Ikhwan withdrew.

The British then appointed Percy Cox, London's envoy to Mandatory Iraq to resolve the territorial disputes between the Emirate of Nejd and Hasa, Sheikhdom of Kuwait and Mandatory Iraq. The agreement was signed in December 1922 that established two neutral zones, one between Iraq and Kuwait and the other with Nejd and Kuwait, resulting in Kuwait losing two-thirds of its land. The convention intended to halt Ikhwan raids and incursions into Kuwaiti and Iraqi territories.

=== Sultanate of Nejd (1921–1926) ===
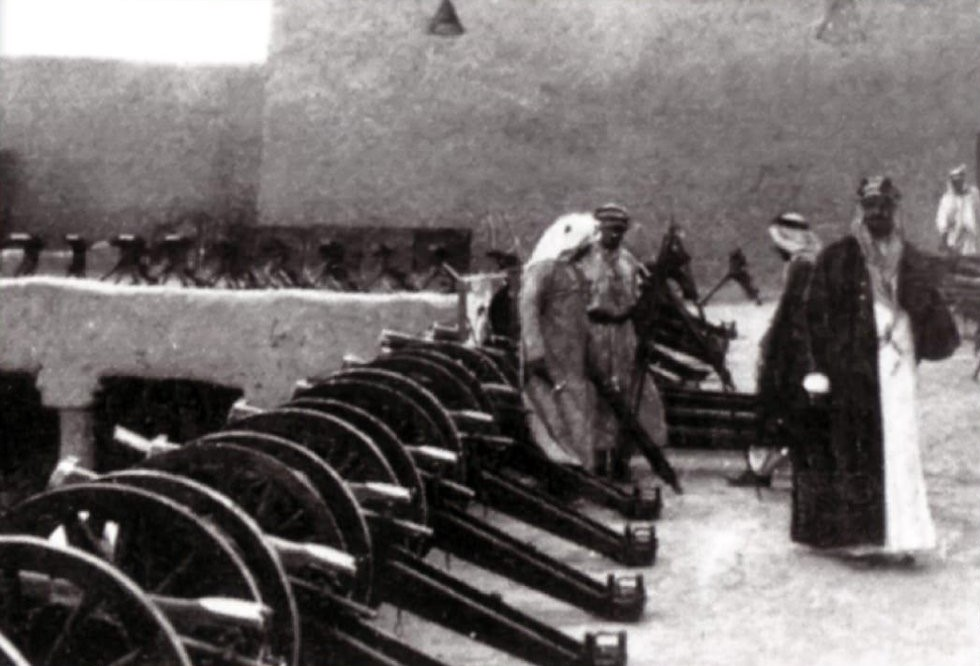
Ibn Saud inspecting the weapons that he had plundered from the Ottoman Empire after Surrender of the Emirate of Ha'il, 1922

Following the death of Abdulaziz al-Rashid in the battle over Qasim and the rampant waning of Ottoman influence in Arabia in the aftermath of World War I, the Rashidis began relying on British support to ward-off external threats to the emirate. The Rashidis and Saudis engaged for the last time in late 1921, when Ibn Saud's forces managed to capture the Rashidi heartland of Ha'il in the second Saudi–Rashidi War, bringing the rule of the Rashidis to a permanent close. Ibn Saud declared himself as the sultan of Nejd and its dependencies, thus renaming the Emirate of Nejd and Hasa as the Sultanate of Nejd in November 1921.

In 1924, Sharif Hussein denied entry to pilgrims entering to Mecca from Nejd which sparked row between the two. In late August 1924, Ibn Saud commenced his campaign against Hejaz by advancing towards Taif. The city capitulated when the Hashemite forces abandoned their posts and the Ikhwan took out their rage on the residents of the city, massacring some 400-1000 civilians. Hussein abdicated his throne to his son, Ali bin Hussein and in the meantime Ikhwan further advanced towards Mecca and the city fell without struggle in December 1924 when Hussein and Ali and the remnants of his forces fled to Jeddah after he was denied assistance from the British, citing a non-intervention policy in religious disputes. After taking over Medina and Yanbu, Ibn Saud besieged the last stronghold of the Hashemites in Jeddah in 1925. Hussein and Ali fled to Amman and Baghdad respectively and the chiefs of the city decided to surrender it to Ibn Saud.

=== Kingdom of Hejaz and Nejd (1926–1932) ===
A month later, Ibn Saud declared himself the ruler of Hejaz and established the Kingdom of Hejaz and Nejd in January 1926. He administered the two parts of his realm as separate units. The British signed a treaty with Ibn Saud that recognized his independence and in exchange he agreed to stop his forces from attacking and harassing neighboring British protectorates. The Soviet Union was the first country to establish full diplomatic ties with Ibn Saud's government following his proclamation in 1926.

However, some Ikhwan leaders defied the orders of Ibn Saud and proceeded to expand the Wahhabi realm into the British protectorates of Transjordan, Iraq and Kuwait. It was primary led by Faisal al-Duwaish. In November 1927, they raided Busaiya in southern Iraq, which marked the beginning of the Ikhwan rebellion. They further raided Kuwait in January 1928 were met with fierce retaliation from the British RAF and Kuwaitis. The relationship between Ibn Saud and Ikhwan nosedived by December 1928 and by March 1929, they faced-off in the Battle of Sabilla. The Ikhwan were outmatched in terms of technological advancement Ibn Saud's troops had and suffered a decisive defeat in the battle. They again clashed in Jabal Shammar in August and lastly in Hafar al-Batin, when the last remnants of the troops alongside Faisal al-Duwaish surrendered to the British in Kuwait in 1930. Duwaish was later extradited to Riyadh where he was imprisoned and died alongside his cohort Sultan bin Bajad al-Otaybi in early 1930s. By 1930, Ibn Saud had also captured Jizan and major combat operations in the unification wars were completed.

In 1932, 17 prominent leading political, ministerial, consultative and administrative figures held multiple meetings at the house of Abdullah bin Muhammad al-Fadl, the chief aide to the Viceroy of Hejaz in al-Salama neighborhood of Taif to sign an official document of 'proposed system' before submitting it to Ibn Saud. The submitted petition included:

- Converting the name of the country (Kingdom of Hejaz and Nejd) to the Kingdom of Saudi Arabia.
- Enacting a Law of Governance and Law of Succession.

=== Kingdom of Saudi Arabia (1932 – present) ===
==== Royal Decree No. 2716 ====
On September 18, 1932, King Abdulaziz ibn Saud issued a royal decree that read:

Royal Decree, No. 2716

September 18th, 1932

Having placed our reliance on God, and in accordance with the telegrams with which our various subjects in the Kingdom of Hejaz, Nejd and its Dependencies have petitioned us, and in compliance with public opinion in our country and because of our desire to unite the sections of this Arabian Kingdom, we have decreed the following:

First Article. The name of the Kingdom of Hejaz and of Nejd and its Dependencies shall be changed to that of the Kingdom of Saudi Arabia; and henceforth our title shall be King of the Kingdom of Saudi Arabia.

Second Article. This change will take effect from the date of its announcement.

Third Article. This change shall have no effect on the existing international treaties, conventions, and obligations, which will retain their value and effectiveness. Similarly, it shall have no effect on individual contracts and covenants, which shall remain effective.

Fourth Article. The rest of the regulations, instructions, and decrees proceeding and ensuing from us shall remain effective after this change.

Fifth Article. Forms of our present government, whether in Hejaz, Nejd or their Dependencies, shall retain their present status temporarily until new forms take their place on the basis of the new constitution.

Sixth Article. Our present Council of Ministers shall immediately formulate a new constitution, a new order for the succession to the throne, and new regulations for governmental organisation, and shall submit them to us that we may issue our orders concerning them.

Seventh Article. The president of our Council of Ministers may add to the members of the Council of Ministers any individual or individuals of wisdom when formulating the above-mentioned regulations, to benefit by their counsels and knowledge.

Eighth Article. We have chosen the day of Thursday, falling on the 21st of Jumada al-Ula and corresponding to the first day of Libra, for the announcement of the unification of the Kingdom of Saudi Arabia, and of God we seek success.

Issued at our palace in Riyadh on this day the seventeenth of the month of Jumada Ula, the year 1351

— Abdulaziz Al-Saud

== Declaration ==
As per the data released by the King Abdulaziz Foundation for Research and Archives (Darah), at almost 9:00 am Mecca Time on September 23, 1932, Prince Faisal announced from al-Hamidiyah Palace the renaming of the Kingdom of Hejaz and Nejd and its annexes to the Kingdom of Saudi Arabia by reciting the Royal Decree No. 2716 issued by King Abdulaziz ibn Saud on September 18, 1932. Faisal had arrived a day earlier from Taif to Mecca after receiving directives from Ibn Saud regarding the announcement of the proclamation. He was followed by Fuad Hamza, advisor to the king and deputy foreign minister and Abdullah al-Fadl, assistant to the Viceroy of Hejaz. Following the declaration, a ceremony was held in the al-Hamidiyah Palace with Faisal and his aides before 101 rounds of artillery fires were shot to salute the historic day.
