= Saudi conquest of Hejaz =

1924–1925 conflict in Arabia

- Part of the Unification of Saudi Arabia and the aftermath of World War I
Date	29 August 1924 – 23 December 1925 (1 year, 3 months, 3 weeks and 3 days)
Location	Hejaz, Kingdom of Hejaz (present-day Saudi Arabia)
Result	Saudi victory
Territorial changes	Annexation of the Hejaz by the Third Saudi State

Belligerents
Third Saudi State; Sultanate of Nejd	Kingdom of Hejaz; Supported by: Weimar Republic; Soviet Union; Transjordan; Mandatory Iraq

Commanders and leaders
(Sultanate of Nejd) Ibn Saud (Sultanate of Nejd) Sultan bin Bajad (Sultanate of Nejd) Eqab bin Mohaya	(Kingdom of Hejaz) Hussein bin Ali (surrendered) (Kingdom of Hejaz) Ali bin Hussein

Units involved
Saudi Arabian Army; Ikhwan Forces	Sharifian Army; Hejaz Air Force

Strength
73,000–77,000 men	10,000 men 8 aircraft 5 tanks

Casualties and losses
~500–1,000 killed	~2,000–3,000 killed 8 aircraft captured/destroyed 5 tanks captured

The Saudi conquest of Hejaz, also known as the Second Hejaz–Nejd War, was a war between the Third Saudi State and the Kingdom of Hejaz from August 1924 to December 1925. It ended with the defeat of the Kingdom of Hejaz and the capture of Hejaz by Ibn Saud's forces, leading to its incorporation into the Third Saudi State. The conflict resulted in the collapse of the Hashemite rule in the region and the proclamation of Ibn Saud as King of Hejaz and the formation of the Kingdom of Hejaz and Nejd.

== Background ==
The 1924 campaign came within the scope of the historic conflict between the Hashemites of Hejaz and the Saudis of Riyadh (Nejd), which had already sparked the First Saudi-Hashemite War in 1919. The decisive moment that led to the conquest of the Hejaz was the decision in late 1923 by the British government as an economic measure to cease paying subsidies to both the feuding families of Arabia, namely the al-Hashemites of the Hejaz and the al-Saud of the Nejd. Without the £60,000 annual subsidy in gold coins paid to him by the British government, the principle restraint on Ibn Saud was removed. Likewise, the end of the subsidies amounting to £25,000 gold coins per month to Hussein bin Ali al-Hashemite, the Sharif of Mecca, spelled the end of the self-proclaimed "King of the Arabs" as Hussein needed British gold coins to bribe Bedouin tribal chiefs to fight for him. During the ensuing campaign of 1924, the Bedouin tribal chiefs of the Hejaz did not rally to the so-called "King of the Arabs" who no longer had the British gold to pay out in bribes, which led to the swift collapse of Hussein's regime.

On 5 March 1924 upon hearing the abolition of the caliphate in Turkey, the Sharif of Mecca proclaimed himself the new caliph and declared that henceforward all Muslims owed him their unconditional loyalty. The decision of Hussein to proclaim himself caliph sparked massive outrage all over the Muslim world with the overwhelming feeling being that the Sharif had no right to call himself caliph. In Islam, to be awarded the title of caliph requires a consensus by the ulama (clergy) that someone meets the criteria for being caliph. Hussein had made no effort to consult the ulama and proclaimed himself caliph upon on a whim upon hearing that the Ottoman caliphate had just been abolished. On 5 June 1924 at a meeting of the Assembly of Notables in Riyadh, all present urged Ibn Saud to declare jihad on the Sharif for Mecca for his blasphemy in proclaiming himself caliph. Ibn Saud ruled it would be wrong to invade the Hejaz during the pilgrimage season and to wait until the pilgrims to Mecca had finished the haji. In August 1924, Ibn Saud declared jihad on Hussein for his sacrilegious act in proclaiming himself caliph.

== History ==
=== Saudi campaign ===
The pretext for renewed hostilities between Nejd and Hejaz came when the pilgrims from Nejd were denied access to the holy places in Hejaz. On 29 August 1924, Ibn Saud began his military campaign against Hejaz by advancing towards Taif, which surrendered without a major struggle. Following the fall of Taif, the Saudi forces and the allied Ikhwan tribesmen moved on Mecca. Sharif Hussein's request for British assistance was denied to him on the grounds of non-intervention in religious disputes. King Hussein bin Ali had meanwhile fled from Mecca to Jeddah, after the assistance request from his son, King Abdullah of Transjordan was denied as well. The city of Mecca fell without struggle on 13 October 1924. On 16 October 1924, Hussein abdicated as King of the Hejaz and fled the Hejaz, never to return. The Islamic Conference, held in Riyadh on the 29 October 1924, brought a wide Islamic recognition of Ibn Saud's jurisdiction over Mecca.

By end of October 1924, all the Hashemites held were the port cities of Jeddah and Yanbu along with Medina. The rapid defeat of the Hashemites was due largely to the end of British subsidies. Without the bribes in form of British gold that were paid out to the Bedouin chiefs of the Hejaz, the unpopular regime of Hussein promptly collapsed. The merchants of Yanbu, Medina and especially Jeddah were determined not to be conquered by Ibn Saud – whom they viewed as a religious fanatic from the Nejd – and collected their wealth together to fund a makeshift army that allowed Yanbu, Medina and Jeddah to hold out against the Saudi forces into 1925.

With the advancement of the Saudi forces and blockade imposed on Jeddah, the Hejazi army began to disintegrate. The city of Medina surrendered on 9 December 1925, (Note: Medina surrendered on 9 December according to Fattouh Al-Khatrash, but according to the University of Indiana, it fell on 5 December.) and Yanbu fell 12 days later. In December 1925 Jeddah was handed to Ibn Saud and Saudi forces entering its gates on 8 January 1926, after capitulation and safe passage was negotiated between King Ali bin Hussein, Ibn Saud, and the British Consul by the city's ruler Sheikh Abdullah Alireza.

== Aftermath ==
Following his takeover of the Kingdom of Hejaz, Ibn Saud was proclaimed King of Hejaz. The kingdom was later incorporated into the Sultanate of Nejd, forming the Kingdom of Hejaz and Nejd, with Ibn Saud ruling both in a dual monarchy.

After stepping down as king, Hussein of Hejaz moved to Aqaba to support his son's war efforts, which made the British force him into exile to Cyprus. Ali bin Hussein, as the King of Hejaz, took office in the middle of a losing war. With the fall of the Kingdom, the dynasty ended up in exile. Hashemites however remained to rule the Emirate of Transjordan and the Kingdom of Iraq.

== See also ==
- History of Saudi Arabia
- List of wars involving Saudi Arabia
- List of modern conflicts in the Middle East

== Books ==
- Dalal Al-Harbi. (2003). King Abdulaziz and his Strategies to deal with events: Events of Jeddah. King Abdulaziz National Library. ISBN 9960-624-88-9.
- Lacey, Robert (1981). The Kingdom. New York: Harcourt Brace Jovanovich. ISBN 0-15-147260-2.
