= Capture of Mecca (1924) =

Capturing of Mecca by the Kingdom of Najd

- Part of Saudi conquest of Hejaz and Unification of Saudi Arabia
Date	5 December 1924
Location	Mecca, Kingdom of Hejaz
Result	Saudi victory
Territorial changes	The Saudis captured Mecca from the Hashemites

Belligerents
(Sultanate of Nejd) Third Saudi State: Ikhwan	Kingdom of Hejaz

Commanders and leaders
(Sultanate of Nejd) Abdulaziz Ibn Saud (Ikhwan) Sultan bin Bajad (Ikhwan) Eqab bin Mohaya	(Kingdom of Hejaz) Hussein bin Ali (Kingdom of Hejaz) Ali bin Hussein

The Capture of Mecca took place on 5 December 1924 in Mecca, as part of the Saudi conquest of the Kingdom of Hejaz by King Abdulaziz Ibn Saud of the Sultanate of Nejd. The Hejaz region was ruled as a kingdom under King Hussein bin Ali of the Hashemite family.

== Background ==
After the fall of the city of Ta'if to Ibn Saud in September 1924, King Hussein bin Ali fled from Mecca to Jeddah on 6 October 1924 on the advice of Hejazi notables and declared his son Ali bin Hussein the King of Hejaz. From Jeddah, Hussein was transported by the British to Aqaba by boat and later to Cyprus. The abdication only further emboldened Ibn Saud to march upon Mecca, entering the city of 5 December 1924. The abandonment of the city left behind a cache of weapons in the Qishla of Mecca which were recovered by Saudi forces.

== Aftermath ==
Ibn Saud declared that Ali bin Hussein was to leave Hejaz as a pre-requisite for peace and that the invasion of Hejaz was to 'guarantee the liberty of pilgrimage and to settle the destiny of the Holy Land in a manner satisfactory to the Islamic world'.

Following the capture of Mecca, Ali and the remaining Hejazi forces were concentrated in the port city of Jeddah which would later be besieged in January 1925 by the Saudi forces. The siege lasted until 16 December 1925 when, with British mediation, Sharif Ali surrendered and left the city for Baghdad. In the same month, Ibn Saud declared himself King of Hejaz in addition to being the Sultan of Nejd.

== See also ==
- History of Saudi Arabia
