= Taif massacre =

1924 massacre during the Second Hashemite-Saudi War

- Location: Taif, Mecca Province, Hejaz
- Date: 1924
- Target: Civilians
- Attack type: Mass execution
- Deaths: 300–400
- Perpetrator: Ikhwan

The Taif massacre was an incident that followed the short 1924 Battle of Taif; the entire episode is also known as the al-Taif incident. The battle and resultant massacre comprised the first major standoff of the Second Hashemite-Saudi War. Following a short siege, Taif was abandoned by Hashemite forces and then capitulated to the battle-ready Ikhwan force under the command of Abdulaziz Ibn Saud. The Ikhwan troops took out their rage on the residents of the city. In the resulting bloodbath, some 300-400 Ta'if residents were massacred.

Following the fall of Taif, Saud's forces moved on Mecca.

== Background ==
Taif was taken by the Sharifian Army in September 1916, during the Arab Revolt, and later incorporated into the Hashemite Kingdom of Hejaz. Tensions arose between Ibn Saud—then Emir of Nejd and Hasa—and Hejazi King Hussein bin Ali, with the situation escalating into violence in 1918. The hostilities were temporarily halted in 1919 following a truce signed in the aftermath of the First Hashemite-Saudi War.

== Conquest and massacre ==
In late August 1924, the Saudi-allied Ikhwan, under the leadership of Sultan bin Bajad and Khaled bin Luwai were ready to attack Taif. The city was supposed to have been defended by the king's son, Ali bin Hussein, but he fled in panic with his troops.

The city was quickly breached by the Ikhwan on 3 September 1924 or it surrendered on 29 August, after which the Ikhwan went on a rampage through the city. In the resulting massacre, some 300 to 400 residents of Taif were killed.

== Aftermath ==
Following the fall of Taif, the Ikhwan moved to conquer Mecca, Medina, and eventually Jeddah, which fell in December 1925, completing the conquest of Hejaz. Ibn Saud was officially crowned as the new King of Hejaz in 1926, and subsequently declared its unification with Nejd as the Kingdom of Saudi Arabia in 1932. He died in Taif on 9 November 1953.

== See also ==
- History of Saudi Arabia
