= Al Hamidiyah Palace =

Historic building in Mecca, Saudi Arabia (1885–1957)

- قصر الحميدية
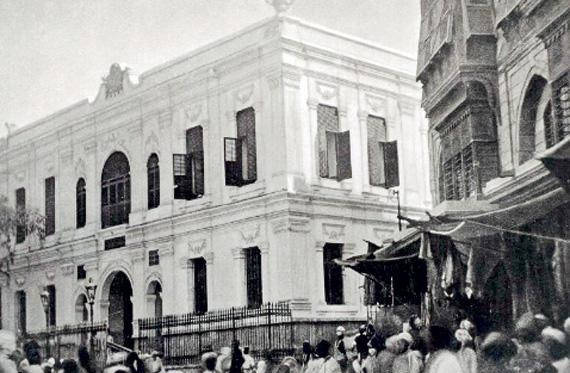
- Hamidiyah Building during Ottoman rule, 1888
- Alternative names: Al Hamidiyah Building

General information
- Status: Demolished
- Architectural style: Neoclassical; Ottoman
- Location: Ajyad, Mecca, Saudi Arabia
- Named for: Sultan Abdul Hamid II
- Completed: 1885
- Demolished: 1957

Design and construction
- Known for: Proclamation of the Kingdom of Saudi Arabia

Al-Hamidiyah Palace (Arabic: قصر الحميدية, romanized: Qasr al-Ḥamīdīah) or al-Hamidiyah Building (Arabic: مبنى الحميدية, romanized: Mabnai al-Ḥamīdīah) was an Ottoman-era double storey government building in the Ajyad district of Mecca, Saudi Arabia. The building played a pivotal role in the country's modern history as it was the location from where Prince Faisal bin Abdulaziz announced the official establishment of Saudi Arabia on King Abdulaziz's behalf. Built by the-then Ottoman governor of Hejaz Osman Nuri Pasha in 1885, it was named after Sultan Abdul Hamid II. The structure was completely razed down in 1957 during the reign of King Saud in order to pave the way for the Grand Mosque's expansion.

== Overview ==
The building was constructed upon the orders from then governor of Hejaz Osman Nuri Pasha in 1885 and was named after the Sultan of the Ottoman Empire, Abdul Hamid II. It served as the administrative headquarters for the affairs of Mecca. After the conquest of Mecca by Ibn Saud's forces in 1924, it served as the seat for several nascent government departments like the General Directorate of Public Security, Directorate of Knowledge and the Shoura Council.

In September 1932, Ibn Saud issued a royal decree that renamed the Kingdom of Hejaz and Nejd as the Kingdom of Saudi Arabia. He directed Prince Faisal bin Abdulaziz, the Viceroy of Hejaz to proclaim the unification on his behalf from al-Hamidiyah Palace.

Following the death of Ibn Saud in 1953, his son Saud ascended to the throne and one of the first decisions he made was to relocate all the government ministries to Riyadh. He built the al-Malazz neighborhood in Riyadh in the 1950s as a housing project for government employees before turning it into a full fledged district. As the building fell into disuse, it was demolished in 1957 as part of King Saud's project of Grand Mosque's expansion project.
