= Battle of Hafr al-Batin =

1929 military engagement

The Battle of Hafr al-Batin (1929) was one of the last major battles of the Ikhwan revolt against the authority of Ibn Saud. The Ikhwan had already suffered a massive defeat at the Battle of Sabilla on March 29, and another defeat at the Battle of Jabal Shammar in August.

The battle consisted of a surprise night attack against the Ikhwan positions.

After the battle, the Ikhwan would attempt a raid on Awazim, but their forces had no fight left in them. In January of 1930, the remaining Ikhwan leaders would surrender to British forces.
