= Kingdom of Hejaz =

1916–1925 Hashemite kingdom in western Arabia

Hashemite Kingdom of Hejaz الْمَمْلَكَةُ الْحِجَازِيَّةُ الْهَاشِمِيَّةُ (Arabic) Al-Mamlakah al-Ḥijāzyah Al-Hāshimīyah
- 1916–1925
- Top: Flag in 1916; Bottom: Flag in 1920 Coat of arms (1920–1925)

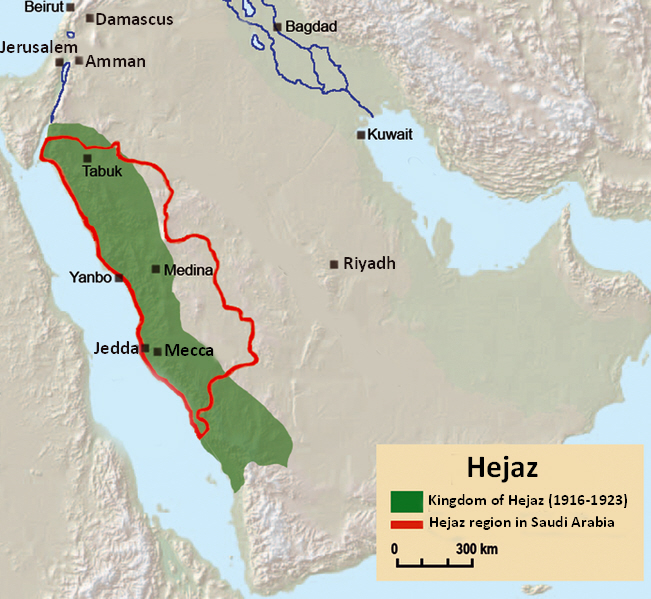
- Kingdom of Hejaz (green) with the modern-day region of Hejaz (red outline)
- Capital: Mecca (1916–1924); Jeddah (1924–1925)
- Common languages: Arabic
- Ethnic groups: Arabs
- Religion: Sunni Islam
- Demonym: Hejazi
- Government: Absolute monarchy
- King
  - 1916–1924: Hussein bin Ali
  - 1924–1925: Ali bin Hussein
- Prime Minister of Hejaz
  - 1916 - 1924: Ali bin Hussein
  - 1924 - 1925: Abdallah Siraj
- Historical era: World War I Interwar period Unification of Saudi Arabia
  - Mecca Revolt: 10 June 1916
  - Recognized: 10 August 1920
  - Foundation of the Sharifian Caliphate: 3 March 1924
  - Conquered by the Nejd: 19 December 1925
  - Abdulaziz crowned King of Hejaz. Merging the two States into a New Kingdom: 8 January 1926

Population
  - 1920: 850,000
  - 1925: 900,000
- Currency: Hejazi riyal
Preceded by	Succeeded by
Ottoman Hejaz	Sharifian Caliphate; Hejaz and Nejd
- Today part of: Saudi Arabia; Jordan

The Hashemite Kingdom of Hejaz (Arabic: المملكة الحجازية الهاشمية, romanized: Al-Mamlakah al-Ḥijāziyyah Al-Hāshimiyyah) was a state in the Hejaz region of Western Asia that included the western portion of the Arabian Peninsula that was ruled by the Hashemite dynasty. It was self-proclaimed as a kingdom in June 1916 during the First World War, to be independent from the Ottoman Empire, on the basis of an alliance with the British Empire to drive the Ottoman Army from the Arabian Peninsula during the Arab Revolt.

The British government had promised Hussein bin Ali, King of Hejaz, a single independent Arab state that would include, in addition to the Hejaz region, modern-day Jordan, Iraq, and most of Syria, with the fate of the region of Palestine being mentioned in more ambiguous terms. However, at the end of the First World War, the Treaty of Versailles turned Syria into a French League of Nations mandate and Iraq, Palestine, and Transjordan into British mandates. Hashemite princes were installed as monarchs under the British mandates in Transjordan and Iraq; this became known as the Sharifian solution.

Relations with the British Empire further deteriorated when more European Jews moved to Palestine, as the area was defined under the British rule. Hussein refused to ratify the 1919 Treaty of Versailles, and, in response to a 1921 British proposal to sign a treaty accepting the Mandate system, stated that he could not be expected to "affix his name to a document assigning Palestine to the Zionists and Syria to foreigners". A further British attempt to reach a treaty failed in 1923–24 and negotiations were suspended in March 1924; within six months the British withdrew their support in favour of their central Arabian ally Ibn Saud, who proceeded to conquer Hussein's kingdom.

On 23 September 1932, the Kingdom of Hejaz and Nejd was unified with the other Saudi dominions, creating the unified Kingdom of Saudi Arabia.

== Background ==
In 1908, the Young Turks took over the Ottoman Empire, and in 1909 when a counter-coup failed, the Young Turks "secularized" the government. Hussein bin Ali, Sharif of Mecca, was appointed by the previous Sultan of the Ottoman Empire and did not favor the Young Turks; his opposition to the empire grew over time, culminating in the Arab Revolt.

Hussein bin Ali, the Sharif and Emir of Mecca from 1908, enthroned himself as King of the Hejaz after proclaiming the Great Arab Revolt against the Ottoman Empire, and continued to hold both of the offices of Sharif and King from 1916 to 1924. At the end of his reign he also briefly laid claim to the office of Sharifian Caliph; he was a 37th-generation direct descendant of Muhammad, as he belongs to the Hashemite family. A member of the Dhawu Awn clan (Banu Hashim) from the Qatadid emirs of Mecca, he was perceived to have rebellious inclinations and in 1893 was summoned to Istanbul, where he was kept on the Council of State. In 1908, in the aftermath of the Young Turk Revolution, he was appointed Emir of Mecca by the Ottoman sultan Abdul Hamid II. In 1916, with the promise of British support for Arab independence, he proclaimed the Great Arab Revolt against the Ottoman Empire, accusing the Committee of Union and Progress of violating tenets of Islam and limiting the power of the sultan-caliph. Shortly after the outbreak of the revolt, Hussein declared himself "King of the Arab Countries". However, his pan-Arab aspirations were not accepted by the Allies, who recognized him only as King of the Hejaz.

In the aftermath of World War I, Hussein refused to ratify the Treaty of Versailles, in protest at the Balfour Declaration and the establishment of British and French mandates in Syria, Iraq, and Palestine. He later refused to sign the Anglo-Hashemite Treaty and thus deprived himself of British support when his kingdom was attacked by Ibn Saud. After the Kingdom of Hejaz was invaded by the Al Saud-Wahhabi armies of the Ikhwan, on 23 December 1925 King Hussein bin Ali surrendered to the Saudis, bringing both the Kingdom of Hejaz and the Sharifate of Mecca to an end.

== History ==
In their capacity as Caliphs, the Sultans of the Ottoman Empire would appoint an official known as the Sharif of Mecca. The role went to a member of the Hashemite family, but the Sultans typically promoted Hashemite intra-familial rivalries in their choice, preventing the building of a solid base of power in the Sharif.

With the outbreak of the First World War in 1914, the Sultan, Mehmed V, in his capacity as Caliph, declared a jihad against the Entente powers. The British in particular hoped to co-opt the Sharif as a weighty alternative religious figure backing them in the conflict. The British already had a series of treaties with other Arab leaders in the region and were also fearful that the Hejaz could be used as a base to attack their shipping to and from India.

The Sharif was cautious but, after discovering that the Ottomans planned to remove and possibly murder him, agreed to work with the British if they would support a wider Arab Revolt and the establishment of an independent Arab Kingdom — the British implied they would. After the Ottomans executed other Arab nationalist leaders in Damascus and Beirut, the Hejaz rose against and soundly defeated them, almost completely expelling them (Medina remaining under Ottoman control throughout).

In June 1916, Hussein bin Ali, Sharif of Mecca, declared himself King of Hejaz as his Sharifian Army participated with other Arab Forces and the British Empire in expelling the Ottomans from the Arabian Peninsula.

The US State Department quotes an aide-mémoire dated 24 October 1917 given by the Arab Bureau to the American Diplomatic Agency in Cairo confirming that

...Great Britain, France and Russia agreed to recognize the Sherif as lawful independent ruler of the Hedjaz and to use the title of "King of the Hedjaz" when addressing him, and a note to this effect was handed to him on 10 December 1916.

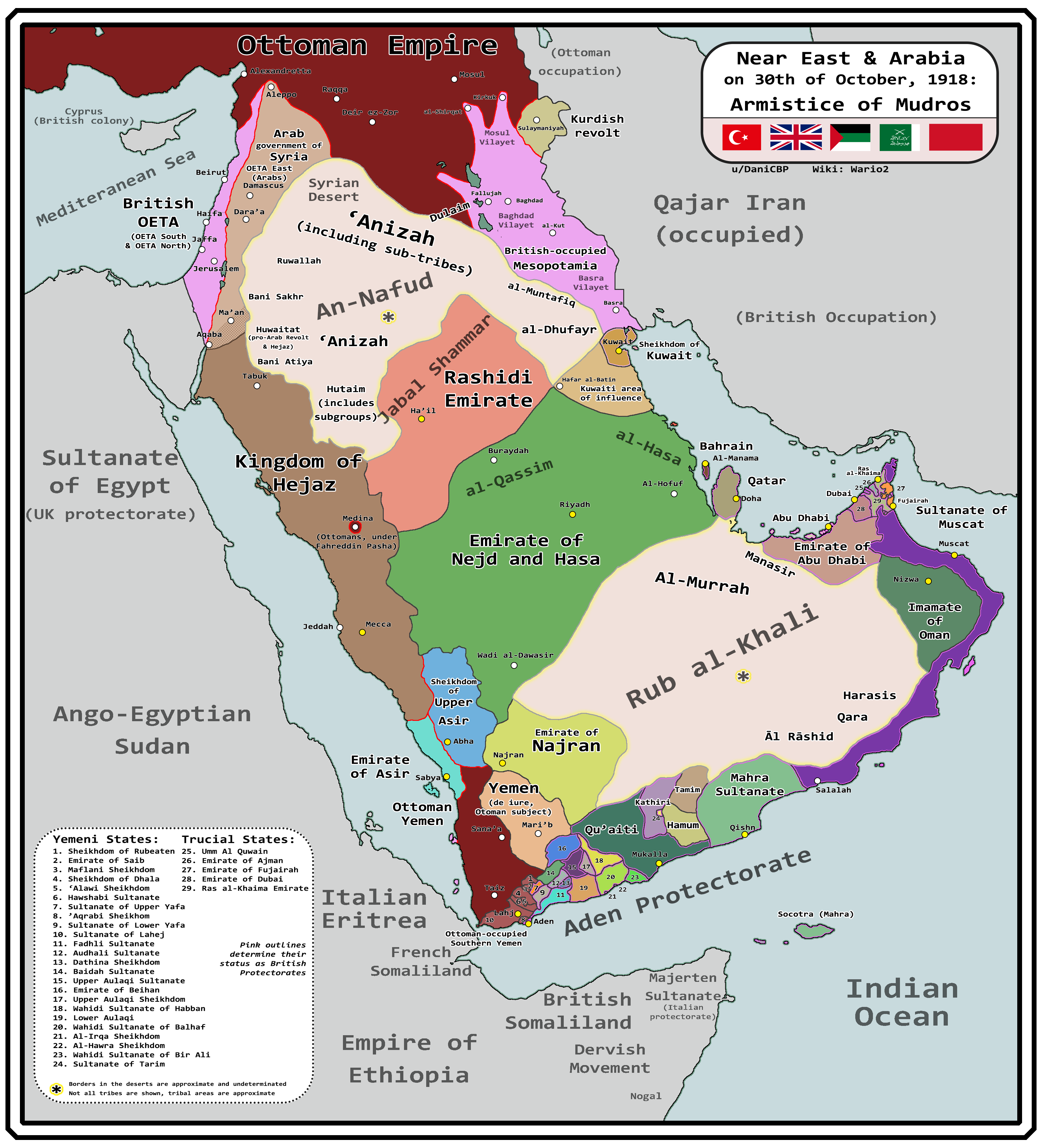
Hejaz (left, in brown) at the end of World War I

The British, though, were compromised by their agreement to give the French control of Syria (comprising modern-day Syria and Lebanon) and did not, in Hussein's eyes, honour their commitments. Nevertheless, they did eventually create Hashemite-ruled kingdoms (in protectorate form) in Transjordan and in Iraq, as well as Hejaz. The changing boundaries of the Ottoman Hejaz Vilayet contributed to uncertainties between the neighbouring Hashemite kingdoms, particularly the competing claim with Transjordan over the inclusion of the sanjak of Ma'an, including the cities of Ma'an and Aqaba.

King Hussein refused to ratify the 1919 Treaty of Versailles, and in response to a 1921 British proposal to sign a treaty accepting the Mandate system stated that he could not be expected to "affix his name to a document assigning Palestine to the Zionists and Syria to foreigners." A further British attempt to reach a treaty failed in 1923–24, and negotiations were suspended in March 1924; within six months the British withdrew their support in favour of their central Arabian ally Ibn Saud, who proceeded to conquer Hussein's Kingdom.

The League of Nations Covenant provided for membership to the signatories of the Peace Treaties; the Hejaz was one of two (the other one was the United States) that failed to ratify Versailles.

== Politics ==
=== List of Kings ===
Name	Lifespan	Reign start	Reign end	Notes	Family	Image
Hussein bin Ali: حسين بن علي	1 May 1854 – 4 June 1931 (aged 77)	10 June 1916	3 October 1924 (abdicated)	Son of Ali bin Muhammad and Salha bint Gharam al-Shahar	Hashemite	Hussein bin Ali of Hejaz
Ali bin Hussein: علي بن حسين	1879 – 13 February 1935 (aged 55–56)	3 October 1924	19 December 1925 (deposed)	Son of Hussein bin Ali and Abdiya bin Abdullah	Hashemite	Ali bin Hussein of Hejaz

== See also ==
- History of Saudi Arabia
- T. E. Lawrence
- Sharifate of Mecca
- Sharifian Caliphate
- Faisal–Weizmann agreement

== Bibliography ==
- Mousa, Suleiman (1978). "A Matter of Principle: King Hussein of the Hijaz and the Arabs of Palestine". International Journal of Middle East Studies. 9 (2): 183–194. doi:10.1017/S0020743800000052. S2CID 163677445.
- Huneidi, Sahar, ed. (2001). A Broken Trust: Sir Herbert Samuel, Zionism and the Palestinians. I.B.Tauris. p. 84. ISBN 978-1-86064-172-5.
- Malik Dahlan (2018). The Hijaz: The First Islamic State. Oxford University Press. pp. 133–. ISBN 978-0-19-093501-6.
