= Sultan bin Bajad al-Otaybi =

Arab tribe chief

Sultan bin Bajad bin Humaid Al Utaibi سلطان بن بجاد بن حميد العتيبي
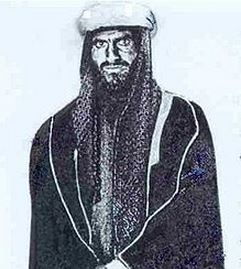
- Born: 1876
- Died: 1932 (aged 55–56); Al Ahsa
- Relatives: Muhammad bin Abdul Rahman Al Saud (son-in-law); Juhayman al-Otaybi (grandson)
- Military career
- Allegiance: Ikhwan (1927–1930)
- Branch: Ikhwan
- Service years: 1910–1930
- Conflicts: Unification of Saudi Arabia; Al-Khurma dispute; Ta'if massacre; Battle of Mecca (1924); Battle of Jeddah (1925); Ikhwan raids on Transjordan; Ikhwan Revolt; Battle of Sabilla

Sultan bin Bajad bin Humaid al-'Utaybi (Arabic: سلطان بن بجاد بن حميد العتيبي Sulṭān bin Bijād bin Ḥumayd al-ʿUtaybī; 1876 – 1932) was the Sheikh of the Otaibah tribe and one of the prominent leaders of the Ikhwan movement in the Arabian Peninsula. This tribal army supported King Abdulaziz in his efforts to unify Saudi Arabia between 1910 and 1927.

Although illiterate, al-Otaybi was deeply religious and strongly adhered to Wahhabi principles. However, conflicts arose between the former allies after the occupation of the Hejaz when King Abdulaziz engaged in violent clashes with other Ikhwan leaders such as Faisal Al Duwaish and Dhaydan bin Hithlain. Abdulaziz wanted to curb incursions outside Arabia and concentrate on building the foundations of a modern state, which al-Otaybi and his associates considered sinful.

Due to political reasons, al-Otaybi declared a rebellion against Ibn Saud in 1928. Otaybi's forces were defeated by the Saudi loyalists in the Battle of Sabilla. He was subsequently captured by the Saudi forces and imprisoned, where he died in 1932.

One of his daughters married Muhammad bin Abdul Rahman, the half-brother of King Abdulaziz.

== Al-Ghata'at ==
Sultan bin Bijad al-Otaybi played a major role in establishing the Hijra al-ghutat, which was considered the most important and well-organized migration (hijra) of the Ikhwan. This is described in the book The Saudis and the Islamic Solution by Prince Abdul Rahman Al Saud, the brother of King Abdul Aziz. Ng Under Sultan bin Bijad's leadership, emigration gained widespread recognition and some five thousand fighters joined the jihad. Sultan bin Bijad himself mentioned the virtue of these individuals, especially Sheikh Abdullah bin Abdul Rahman bin Aqla, who served as the Deputy of the Two Holy Mosques under the leadership of His Eminence Sheikh Abdul Malik bin Duhaish. This migration was characterized by its emphasis on guidance, opinions and moral values, as noted by Hajj Mutawa Al-Sabi. Princess Madawi bint Mansour bin Abdul Aziz also documented this period in her study of desertion during the reign of King Abdulaziz.

== Battle of Turubah ==
After the end of World War I and the establishment of King Hussein bin Ali's rule in the Hijaz, King Hussein organized an army under the command of his son, Sharif Abdullah bin Al Hussein. He ordered this force to march on Khurmah, which they did on 25 May 1919 AD (26/8/1337 AH). Abdullah's army advanced and reached the vicinity of Al-Khurma, specifically the town of Turbah.

In response, Ibn Saud sent a military contingent led by Sultan al-Din bin Bijad to help Khalid bin Louay, the ruler of Al-Khurmah. However, Abdullah bin Al-Hussein's forces were caught off guard by a pre-dawn surprise attack by the Brotherhood. This attack was led by Sultan bin Bijad, and few managed to escape.

== Conquest of the Hejaz ==
In June 1924, King Abdul Aziz of Najd held a conference in Riyadh attended by scholars, tribal leaders and Ikhwan leaders. The purpose was to obtain a legal fatwa authorizing war against Sharif Hussein. This would ensure the freedom to perform the Hajj pilgrimage, which Sharif Hussein had prevented, causing unrest especially among the Ikhwan. The Riyadh Conference resulted in a decision to invade the Hejaz, and orders were sent to the Ikhwan forces in Torbah and Al-Khurmah to prepare. Sultan bin Bijad, their leader, was ordered to march on Taif.

=== The capture of Taif ===
In the month of Safar, an Ikhwan contingent of 3,000 fighters led by Sultan bin Bijad positioned themselves near Taif with a strong inclination to fight. They engaged Ali bin Hussein's forces and emerged victorious. The Ikhwan forces then entered Taif, resulting in the deaths of about 300 civilians. With the capture of Taif, the road to Mecca was open, and the Ikhwan intended to proceed. However, King Abdul Aziz intervened and ordered them to halt their advance.

=== The capture of Mecca and Jeddah ===
On the 17th of Rabi' al-Awwal in 1342 AH, Sultan bin Bijad and Khalid bin Louay, leaders of the Ikhwan, entered Mecca armed and accompanied by two Muharram. They sent letters to the delegates and consuls of various countries in Jeddah, announcing their occupation of Mecca and inquiring about their position in the ongoing war. Replies were received from the Consul of the United Kingdom, the Consul of the Kingdom of Italy, the Under-Consul of France, the Vice-Consul of the Netherlands, and the Deputy Consul of the Shah, declaring their complete neutrality in the conflict.

The Ikhwan then joined King Abdul-Aziz's forces in besieging Jeddah. After a year-long siege, Jeddah surrendered on the 6th of Jumada al-Thani in 1344 AH. After this victory, they annexed Taif and Mecca. In 1342 AH they entered Mecca accompanied by Sharif Khalid bin Luay during the retreat of Sharif Hussein. They also participated in the siege of Jeddah.

In the book of the Mahmudiyah group, Sheikh Muhammad bin Othman, known as the Ikhwan sheikh and judge, described their entry into Makkah, where they walked uncovered, carrying lights and wood. This was a significant event for them, symbolizing their devotion and connection to the example of their Prophet.

== The case of the siege of Jeddah ==
The Ikhwan leaders advocated the conquest of Jeddah. However, Abdul Aziz did not oppose this move out of fear of them, as he remained silent when they took control of Taif and Mecca. Instead, he was worried about the possible intervention of the English fleet stationed along the coast to protect the foreigners. During the siege, Sultan bin Bijad and Faisal al-Dawish expressed their desire to be appointed rulers of Mecca and Medina. In an alternative account, they demanded the emirate of Medina for Ad-Dawish because of his role in its conquest, and the emirate of Taif and Mecca for Ibn Bijad because of his conquest there. However, Imam Abdul-Aziz rejected these requests, taking into account the sentiments of the Hijazis and the tradition of appointing provincial princes exclusively from the House of Saud. He appointed Abdullah bin Jalawi as Emir of Al-Ahsa and his cousin Abdul Aziz bin Musaed as Emir of Hail. This led to mistrust between the two leaders, suggesting that Abdulaziz Al Saud was attempting to centralize power within his family, which was contrary to their religious beliefs.

=== The case of the Egyptian Mahmal ===
In the summer of 1926, after the conquest of Mecca, the city welcomed pilgrims. Egyptian pilgrims, anxious to make a positive impression on the new king of the Hejaz, joined the procession with a musical group as part of the Mahmal, escorted by Egyptian guards. The Ikhwan, a religious group, objected to the music as sacrilegious, but the musicians ignored their protest and continued as they had in previous years.

On the orders of Ibn Bijad, some members of the Ikhwan attacked the musicians, causing casualties. Despite the mediation efforts of Prince Faisal bin Abdulaziz, the conflict continued. As a result, the Egyptians severed ties with the new government and refused to weave the cover of the Mahmal, resulting in a halt to Egyptian involvement. This incident created a political problem for the Ikhwan that affected its relations with other Muslim groups.
