= Unification of Saudi Arabia =

- Part of the Middle Eastern theatre of World War I (1914–1918) and the aftermath of World War I
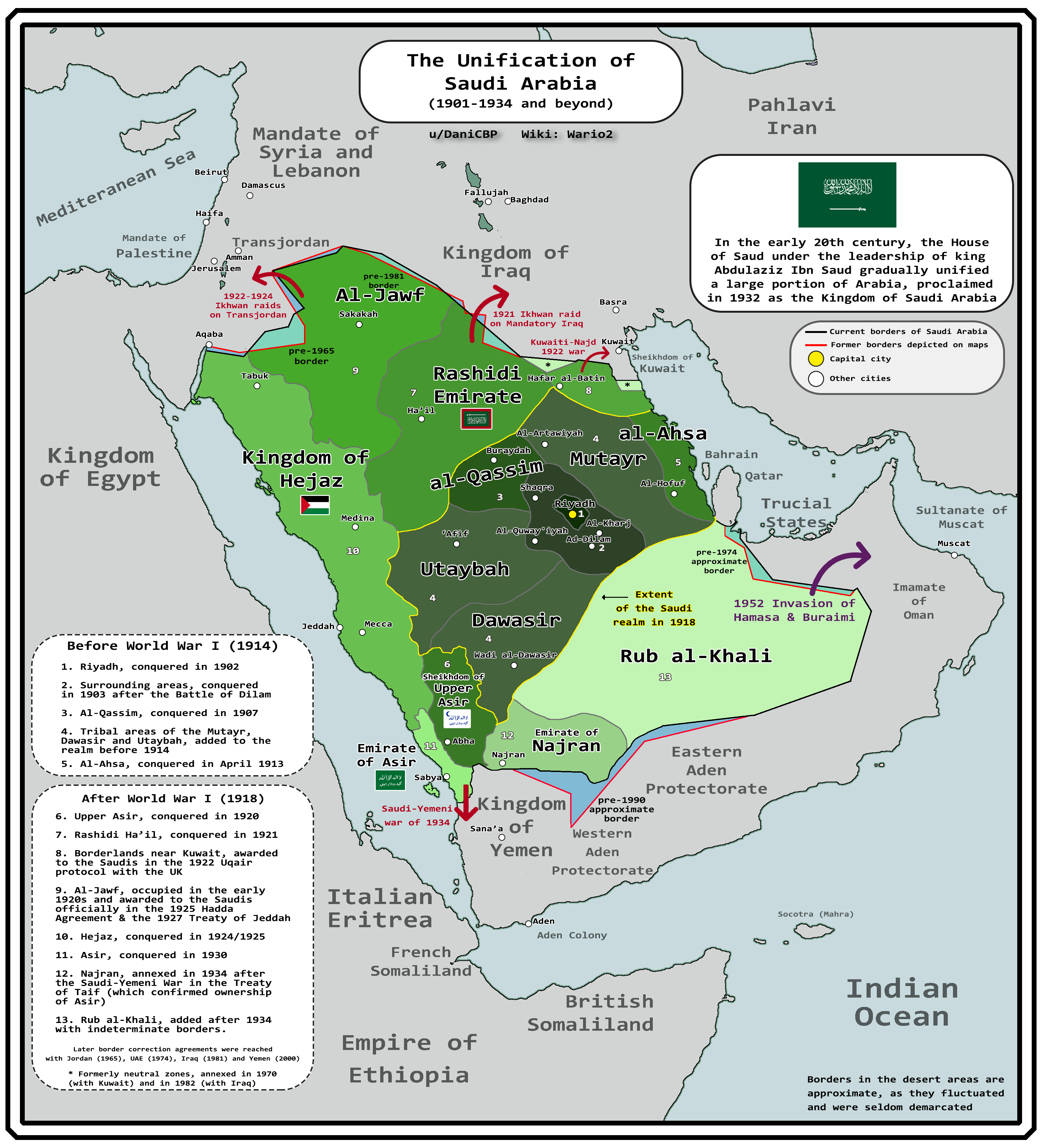
- Territorial evolution of Saudi Arabia
Date	First phase: 13 January 1902 – 23 September 1932; Second phase: 20 March 1934 – 14 June 1934
Location	Arabian Peninsula • Principality of Najran • Emirate of Asir • Sheikdom of Upper Asir • Third Saudi State • Emirate of Jabal Shammar • Kingdom of Yemen • Emirate of Kuwait • Transjordan • Mandatory Iraq
Result	Saudi victory; Emirate of Jabal Shammar and Kingdom of Hejaz incorporated into the Third Saudi state; End of Rashidi dynasty and exile of Hashemites; End of the Ottoman Empire and its presence in the Arabian Peninsula; Approximately 68% of Emirate of Kuwait territory ceded to the Third Saudi state under the Uqair Protocol of 1922; Proclamation and establishment of the Kingdom of Saudi Arabia in 1932; Asir, Najran, and Jazan became provinces of Saudi Arabia following the Saudi–Yemeni War in 1934
Territorial changes	Saudi takeover of approximately 80% of the Arabian Peninsula

Belligerents
Third Saudi state: Emirate of Riyadh (1902–1913); Emirate of Najd and Hasa (1913–1921); Sultanate of Najd (1921–1926); Kingdom of Hejaz and Nejd (1926–1932); Kingdom of Saudi Arabia (from 1932)	Ottoman Empire (until 1919); Al-Muntafiq; Jabal Shammar; Supported by: German Empire Kingdom of Hejaz (1916–1925); Sharifian Caliphate (1924–1925); Supported by: Weimar Republic (1925) (Jordan) Transjordan (1921–1922); Mandatory Iraq (1921–1928); Sheikhdom Kuwait (1919–1928); Supported by: United Kingdom (1920–1927) Emirate of Asir (1933); Kingdom of Yemen (1934); Supported by: Italy

Commanders and leaders
Ibn Saud; Abdulaziz bin Musaed; Saud bin Abdulaziz; Faisal bin Abdulaziz; Muhammad bin Abdulrahman; Sa'ad bin Abdulrahman † (Ikhwan) Sultan bin Bajad # (Ikhwan) Faisal al-Duwaish # (Ikhwan) Eqab bin Mohaya † (Ikhwan) Khaled bin Luai #	Fakhri Pasha (Ottoman Empire) Sami Pasha (Ottoman Empire) Nadim Bey (surrendered); Ajmi al-Sa'dun (Emirate of Jabal Shammar) Abdulaziz bin Mutaib † (Emirate of Jabal Shammar) Saud bin Abdulaziz † (Emirate of Jabal Shammar) Ajlan bin Mohammed † (Kingdom of Hejaz) Hussein bin Ali # (Kingdom of Hejaz) Ali bin Hussein (Jordan) Abdullah I (Jordan) Mithqal Al-Fayez (Jordan) Minwer Shtewi Al-Hadid † (Jordan) Haditha Al-Khraisha (Iraq) Faisal I Salim I Sheikh Ali Khalifa Al-Abdullah II Al-Sabah; Sheikh Duaij Salman Al-Sabah (Emirate of Asir) Al-Hasan bin Ali al-Idrisi (Kingdom of Yemen) Yahya Muhammad (Kingdom of Yemen) Ahmad bin Yahya

Units involved
Saudi Arabian Army; Ikhwan (until 1929)	Ottoman Army; Sharifian Army

Strength
400,000	(Ottoman Empire) 23,000 (Kingdom of Yemen) 37,000

Casualties and losses
Unknown	Unknown
- 18,000+ killed in total^{[A]}

The unification of Saudi Arabia was a series of military and political campaigns in which the various tribes, sheikhdoms, city-states, emirates, and kingdoms of most of the Arabian Peninsula were brought under the rule of the House of Saud. Unification began in 1902 and culminated in 1932, when the Kingdom of Saudi Arabia was proclaimed under the leadership of Ibn Saud, marking the establishment of what is known as the Third Saudi state, the successor to the First Saudi state and the Second Saudi state. A brief final phase of consolidation continued into 1934.

The House of Saud had been in exile in the British-protected Emirate of Kuwait since 1893, following their second removal from power and the dissolution of their polity by the Rashidi dynasty rulers of the Emirate of Jabal Shammar, allies of the Ottoman Empire.

In 1902, Ibn Saud returned to Najd and recaptured Riyadh, the former capital of the House of Saud. He subsequently consolidated control over much of the Arabian Peninsula, subjugating the remainder of Najd, seizing Al-Hasa from the Ottoman Empire, and conquering the Emirate of Jabal Shammar and the Hejaz from the Kingdom of Hejaz home to the Muslim holy cities of Mecca and Medina between 1913 and 1925.

The resulting state was known as the Kingdom of Hejaz and Najd from 1926 until it was renamed the Kingdom of Saudi Arabia in 1932. Two years later, in 1934, following the formal conclusion of the unification, the Kingdom of Yemen launched a war against Saudi Arabia. Saudi forces emerged victorious, ending Yemeni claims to the southern provinces of Asir, Najran, and Jazan. The Saudi–Yemeni War is often considered part of the broader unification process and is sometimes described as its second phase.

It has often been claimed that this process caused some 400,000 to 800,000 casualties. However, recent research suggests that though bloody, the number of deaths and injuries was significantly lower.

== Background ==
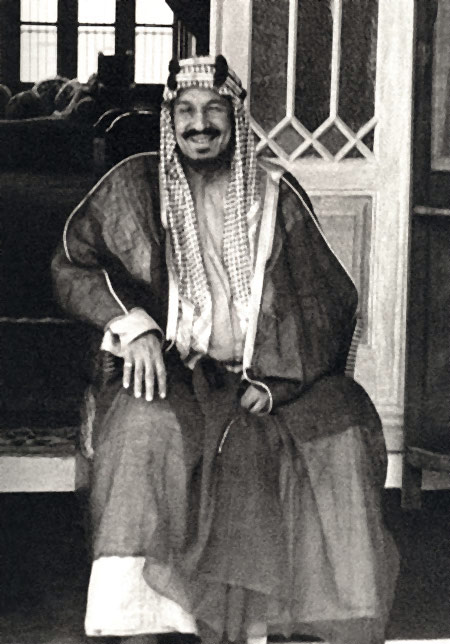
Ibn Saud. The founder of Saudi Arabia in 1934 and the military leader of the unification of Saudi Arabia.

The First Saudi state was founded in 1727. Following the Diriyah pact in 1744 between Muhammad Abdul Wahhab and Muhammad bin Saud, the state grew in power. The alliance established a polity grounded in a strict interpretation of Islam. The religious doctrine that emerged from this partnership later became known as Wahhabism, a movement advocating the purification of Islamic practices and a return to what its followers considered the original teachings of Islam. Originating in the Najd region of central Arabia, the First Saudi state expanded rapidly, gaining control over much of the Arabian Peninsula and capturing the holy city of Mecca in 1803.

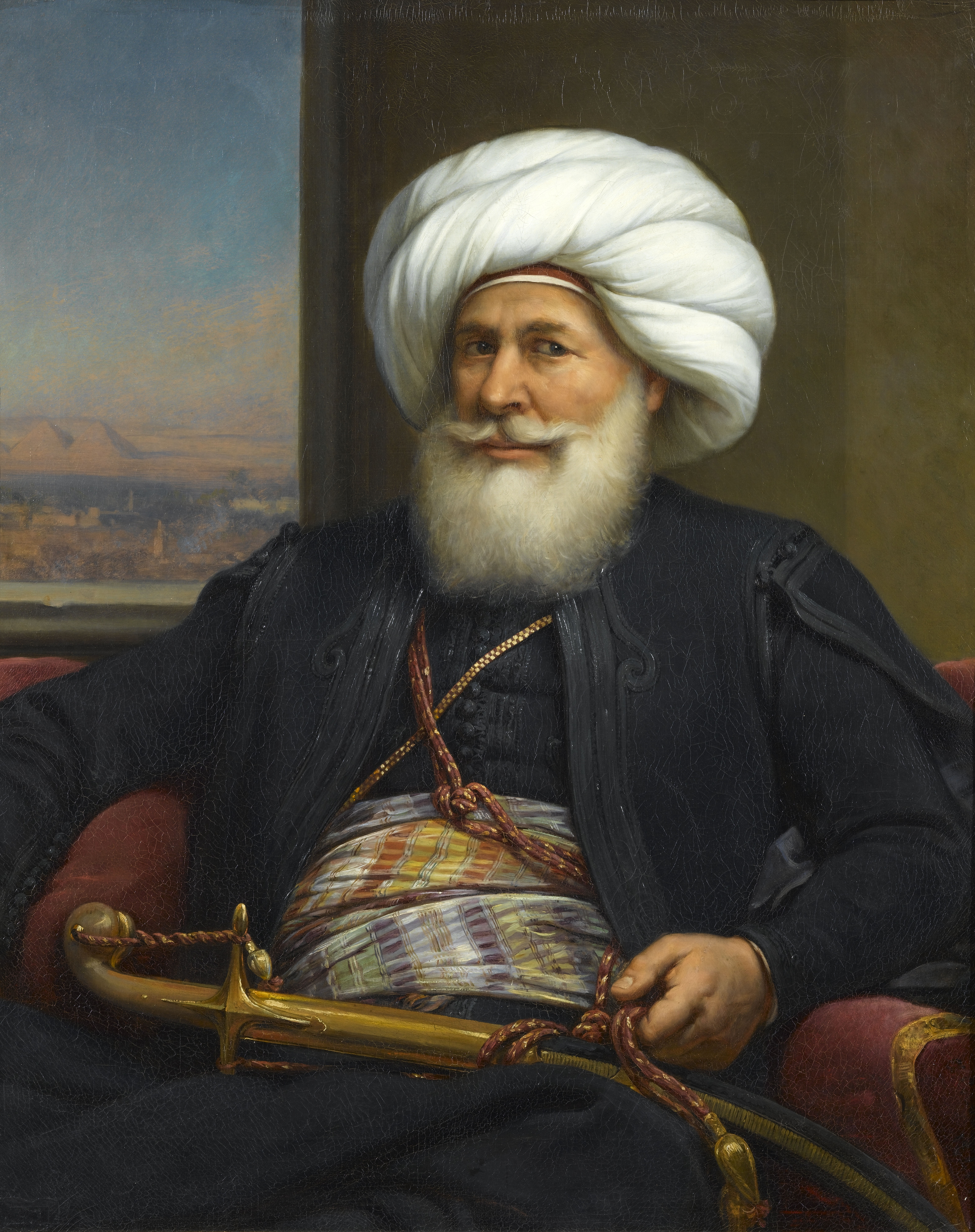
Portrait of Muhammad Ali Pasha

The fall of Mecca to the Saudis challenged the legitimacy of the Ottoman Empire, which had exercised sovereignty over the holy cities since 1517. In response to the expansion of Saudi power, the Ottomans initiated military action against the First Saudi state. The task of suppressing the movement was entrusted to Muhammad Ali Pasha, the Ottoman viceroy of Egypt, whose regional ambitions aligned with the empire’s objective of restoring control over the Hejaz.

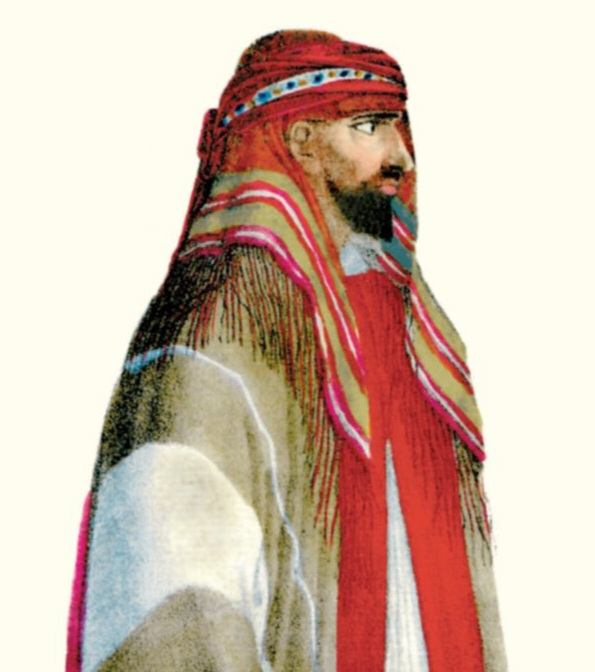
Portrait of Abdullah bin Saud

Muhammad Ali dispatched forces to the Hejaz, where they recaptured Mecca and reestablished Ottoman authority. His son, Ibrahim Pasha, led a subsequent campaign into Najd during the Najd Expedition, capturing several towns and advancing toward the Saudi capital of Diriyah. After besieging the city for several months, Ibrahim secured its surrender in 1818. Diriyah was subsequently destroyed, and many members of the House of Saud and Al-Sheikh Dynasty were sent to Ottoman Egypt and Constantinople. The last Saudi emir of the First Saudi state, Abdullah bin Saud, was later executed in Constantinople.

Although the First Saudi state had been dismantled, the House of Saud survived in exile and later reestablished their authority with the founding of the Second Saudi state. This period is generally considered to have begun with Turki ibn Abdallah's capture of Riyadh in 1824, which he designated as the new capital. The Second Saudi state endured until its defeat at the Battle of Mulayda in 1891.

Unlike the expansionist First Saudi state, the Second state was characterized by recurring internal divisions, succession disputes, and regional rivalries. These internal weaknesses enabled the Rashidi dynasty of Jabal Shammar to expand its influence, eventually surpassing the Saudis as the dominant power in central Arabia. Following the defeat at Mulayda, the Saudi ruler Abdul Rahman bin Faisal fled with his family to Ottoman Iraq in 1893 and later Kuwait.

During their exile, divisions persisted within the House of Saud however, the memory of Saudi rule remained strong among segments of the tribal population in Najd. These loyalties, combined with growing dissatisfaction toward Rashidi rule, contributed to the rise of Ibn Saud. In 1902, he recaptured Riyadh, initiating a prolonged campaign to consolidate control over much of the Arabian Peninsula and laying the foundations for the modern Kingdom of Saudi Arabia.

Ibn Saud’s early campaigns relied heavily on tribal alliances, as well as religious and political networks associated with the legacy of the First and Second Saudi states.

In 1932, the Kingdom of Saudi Arabia was proclaimed. The process of territorial consolidation was largely completed following the Saudi–Yemeni War in 1934, which marked the end of major unification campaigns on the Arabian Peninsula.

== History ==
=== Saudi take over of Riyadh ===
In 1901, Abdulaziz, the son of the last emir of the Second Saudi state, Abdul Rahman bin Faisal, later known as Ibn Saud, (Note: "Ibn" means "son" in Arabic and thus "Ibn Saud" means "Son of Saud" (see Arabic name). Although Westerners widely referred to Abdulaziz as Ibn Saud in later years, "the clan chieftain's title of Ibn Sa'ud continued to refer to Abdul Rahman until he had established himself as such." Abdulaziz never referred to himself by this title, and some authors (e.g. Helms 1981, p. 14), avoid using it entirely.) asked the Emir of Kuwait, where the family had been living in exile since the fall of the second Saudi state to the Ottomans and the Rashidis, for men and supplies to attack Riyadh. Already involved in several wars with the Rashidis, the Emir agreed to the request and provided Ibn Saud with horses and arms. Although the exact number of men fluctuated during the subsequent journey, he is believed to have departed with around 40 men. (Note: Lacey observes, "Forty is the number which bedouin often pick upon when they wish to describe a smallish body of men, and forty is the number of companions which Abdulaziz is said to have had with him when he left Kuwait in September 1901." Lacey offers further insight into the ambiguity surrounding the details of the capture of Riyadh, whose place in Saudi Arabian folklore he compares to the Storming of the Bastille: Ibn Saud himself told numerous versions over the years, which is only partly attributable to Ibn Saud's excitability. According to Lacey, "He was spinning history in the way that the Old Testament scribes spun their legends or the creator of the Chanson de Roland wove his epic, for even today it remains the pleasant obstinacy of the Arab to be less captivated by the distinction between fact and fiction than by mystery, romance, poetry, imagination – and even downright caprice.")

In January 1902, Ibn Saud and his men reached Riyadh. With only a small force, he believed the only viable way to take the city was to capture Masmak fort and kill Ibn Ajlan, the chief of Riyadh. After achieving these objectives, they successfully seized the city during a night raid. With the capture of his family's ancestral home, Ibn Saud demonstrated that he possessed the qualities necessary to be a sheikh or emir: leadership, courage, and luck. This marked the beginning of the Third Saudi state. Ibn Saud's dominions became known as the Emirate of Riyadh, which lasted until 1921.

=== Saudi–Rashidi War ===
The Saudi–Rashidi War, also referred as the "First Saudi–Rashidi War" or the "Battles for Qasim", was engaged between the Saudi loyal forces of the newborn Sultanate of Nejd versus the Emirate of Ha'il (Jabal Shammar), under the Rashidis. The warfare period of sporadic battles ended with Saudi takeover of the Al-Qassim Region, after decisive victory in Qasim on 13 April 1906, though other engagements followed into 1907.

=== Al-Hasa and Qatif ===
In 1913, Ibn Saud, with support from the Ikhwan, conquered al-Hasa from an Ottoman garrison which had controlled the area from 1871. He then integrated al-Hasa and Qatif into the Emirate. The people in these areas were Shia, whereas the Saudis were Sunni Wahhabi puritans, resulting in harsh treatment for Shi'a Muslims in Saudi Arabia, as opposed to the relatively tolerant treatment by Sunni Ottomans.

=== Kuwait–Najd War ===
The Kuwait-Najd War occurred because Ibn Saud wanted to annex Kuwait. Ibn Saud insisted that Kuwait's territory belonged to him. The sharpened conflict between Kuwait and Najd led to the death of hundreds of Kuwaitis. The war resulted in sporadic border clashes throughout 1919–1920.

Following Kuwait–Najd War, Ibn Saud imposed a tight trade blockade against Kuwait for 14 years from 1923 until 1937. The goal of the Saudi economic and military attacks on Kuwait was to annex as much of Kuwait's territory as possible. At the Uqair conference in 1922, the boundaries of Kuwait and Najd were set. Kuwait had no representative at the Uqair conference. Ibn Saud persuaded Sir Percy Cox to give him two-thirds of Kuwait's territory due to his de facto control of it. More than half of Kuwait was lost due to Uqair. After the Uqair conference, Kuwait was still subjected to a Saudi economic blockade and intermittent Saudi raiding.

=== During World War I ===
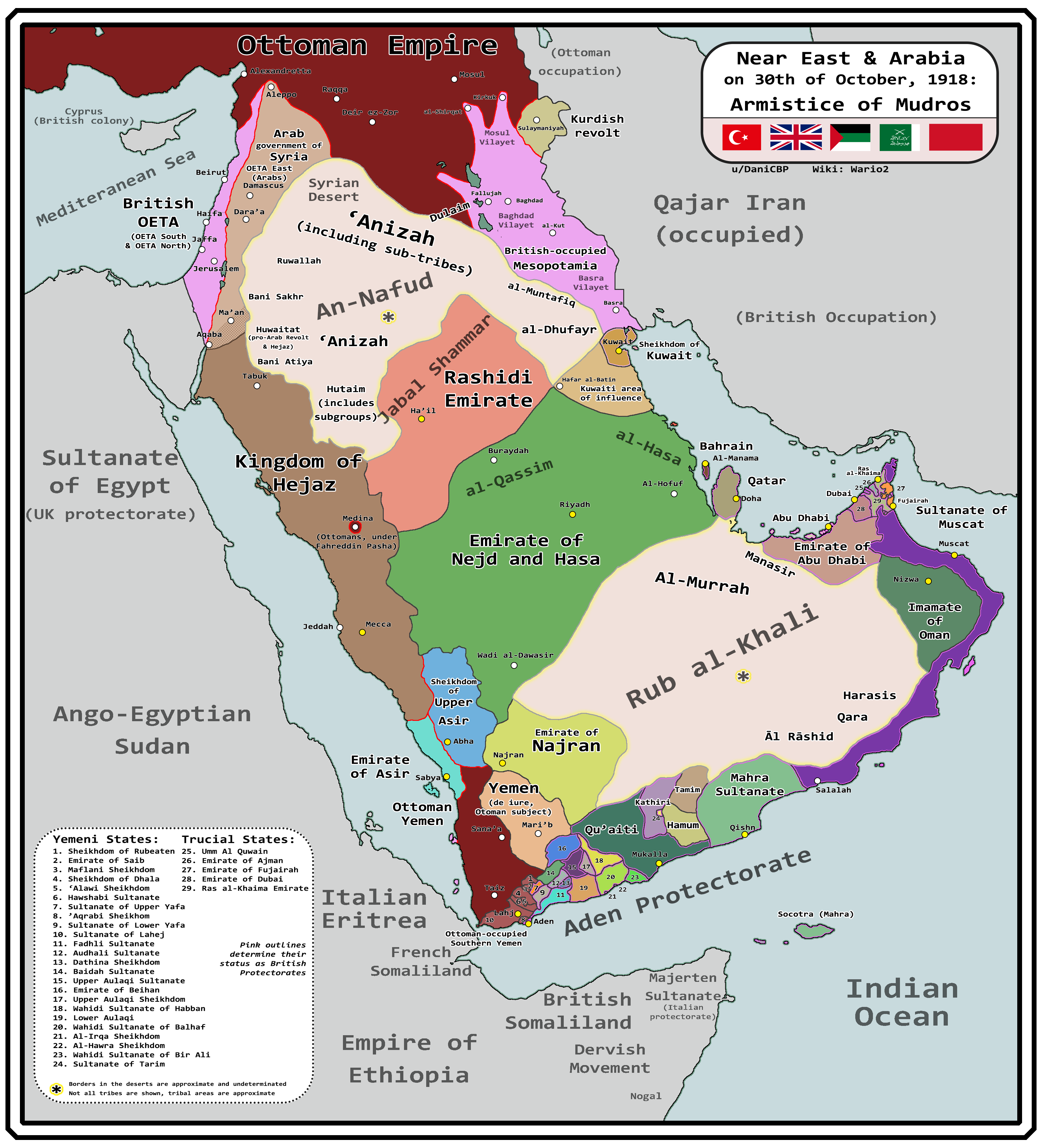
Arabia at the end of WWI

In December, the British government (started early 1915) attempted to cultivate favor with Ibn Saud via its secret agent, Captain William Shakespear, and this resulted in the Treaty of Darin. After Shakespear's death at the Battle of Jarrab, the British began supporting Ibn Saud's rival Sharif Hussein bin Ali, leader of the Hejaz. Lord Kitchener also appealed to Hussein bin Ali, Sharif of Mecca for assistance in the conflict and Hussein wanted political recognition in return. An exchange of letters with Henry McMahon assured him that his assistance would be rewarded between Egypt and Persia, with the exception of imperial possessions and interests in Kuwait, Aden, and the Syrian coast. Contrary to its negotiations with Ali, the British entered into the Treaty of Darin, which made the lands of the House of Saud a British protectorate. Ibn Saud pledged to again make war against Ibn Rashid, who was an ally of the Ottomans. Ibn Saud was also given a sum of £20,000 upon signing the treaty as well as a monthly stipend of £5000 in exchange for waging war against Ibn Rashid.

=== First Nejd–Hejaz War ===
The First Saudi-Hashemite War or the Al-Khurma dispute took place in 1918–1919 between Abdulaziz Al Saud of the Emirate of Nejd and the Hashemites of the Kingdom of Hejaz. The war came within the scope of the historic conflict between the Hashemites of Hejaz and the Saudis of Riyadh (Nejd) over supremacy in Arabia. It resulted in the defeat of the Hashemite forces and capture of al-Khurma by the Saudis and his allied Ikhwan, but British intervention prevented the immediate collapse of the Hashemite kingdom, establishing a sensitive cease-fire, which would last until 1924.

=== Conquest of Ha'il ===
Conquest of Ha'il, also referred as the Third Saudi–Rashidi War, was engaged by the Saudi forces with its ally Ikhwan tribesmen upon the Emirate of Ha'il (Jabal Shammar), under the last Rashidi rulers. On 2 November 1921, Jabal Shammar was completely conquered by Saudi forces and subsequently incorporated into the Sultanate of Nejd.

=== Ikhwan raids ===
==== Raids on Transjordan ====
Ikhwan raids on Transjordan were a series of plunders by the Ikhwan, irregular Arab tribesmen of Nejd, on Transjordan between 1922 and 1924. Though the raids were not orchestrated by Ibn Saud, the ruler of Nejd, nothing was done by him to stop the raiding parties of his ally Ikhwanis. This however changed after the conquest of Hejaz, when the increasingly critical and negative stance of Ibn Saud on Ikhwan raids developed into an open feud and essentially a bloody conflict since 1927.

In the early 1920s, the repeated Wahhabi incursions of Ikhwan from Najd into southern parts of his territory were the most serious threat to emir Abdullah's position in Transjordan. The emir was powerless to repel those raids by himself, thus the British maintained a military base, with a small air force, at Marka, close to Amman.

==== 1921 raid on Mandatory Iraq ====
In 1921, an Ikhwan party raided southern Iraq which was under the British mandate, pillaging Shia villages, resulting in the massacre of 700 Shias.

=== Second Nejd–Hejaz War ===
The Saudi conquest of Hejaz was a campaign, engaged by Saudi Sultan Abdulaziz Al Saud to take over the Hashemite Kingdom of Hejaz in 1924–1925. The campaign successfully ended in December 1925, with the fall of Jeddah. Subsequently, in 1926, Abdulaziz was proclaimed king of Hejaz, and raised Nejd to a kingdom as well in 1927. For the next five-plus years, the Saudi domains were referred to as the Kingdom of Nejd and Hejaz, though they were administered as separate units.

=== Ikhwan rebellion ===
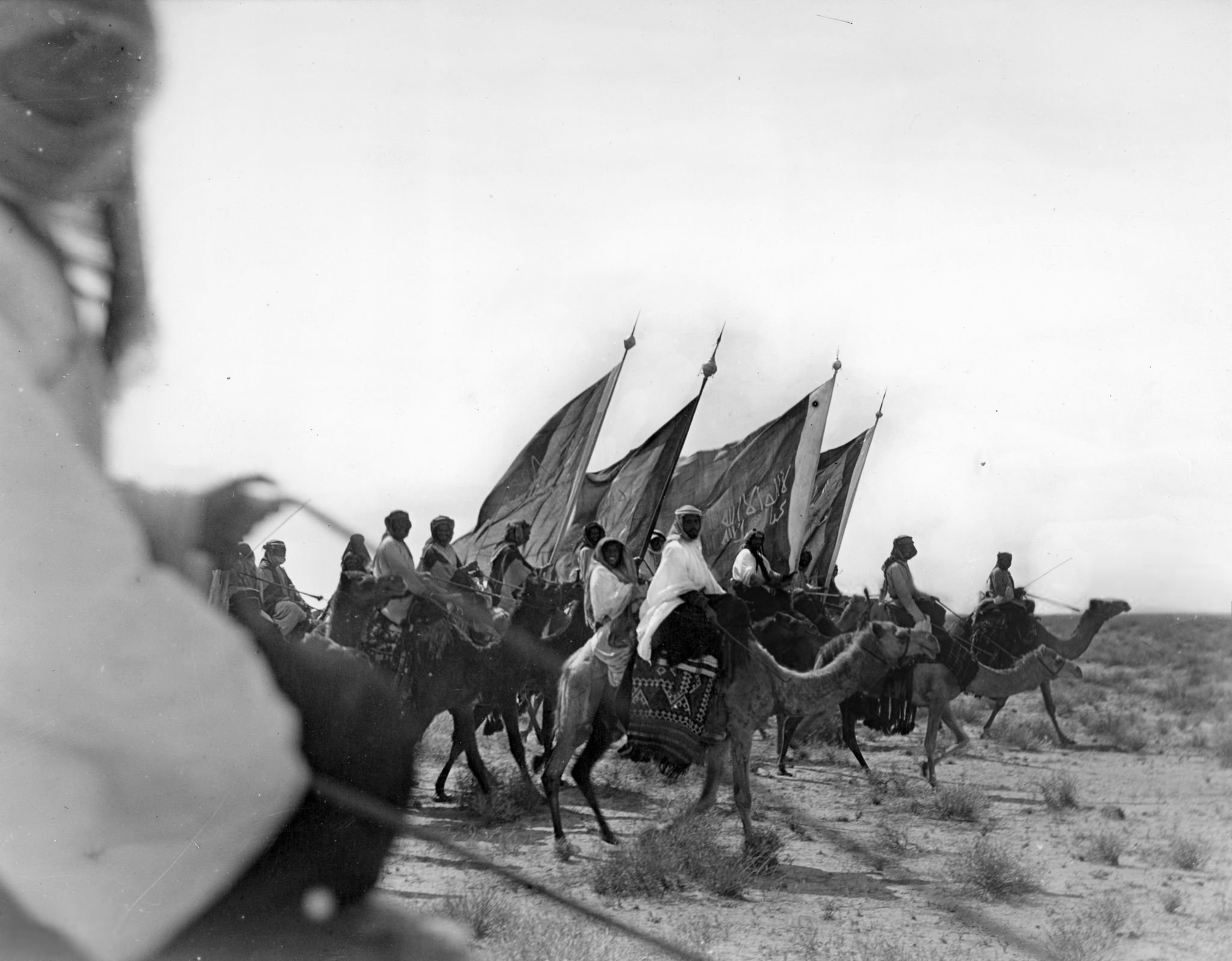
The Ikhwan army in Ikhwan Revolt against the alliance of the British Empire, Kuwait and Ibn Saud

As Saudi expansion slowed in the 1920s, some among the Ikhwan pushed for continued expansion, particularly to the British-controlled territories such as Transjordan to the north - where the Ikhwan raided in 1922 and 1924. By this time, the few parts of central Arabia that hadn't been overrun by the Saudi-Ikhwan forces had treaties with Britain, and Abdulaziz had realized the folly of a potential conflict with the British. However, the Ikhwan had been taught that all non-Wahhabis were infidels. Faisal al-Dawish of the Mutair tribe and Sultan bin Bajad of the Otaiba tribe, the leaders of the Ikhwan, were among those who accused Abdulaziz of going "soft", with the former reportedly telling the latter that the Saudis were "as much use as camel bags without handles".

A rebellion erupted, climaxing in a battle at Sabillah, which some have labeled a massacre but pro-Saudi sources consider to have been a fair fight. Additional battles erupted through 1929 in Jabal Shammar and in the vicinity of the Awazim tribe. The rebellion was put down in 1930, with the surrender of last opposition elements. Though the survivors were jailed, their descendants remained opposed to Saudi rule, and one such descendant, Juhayman al-Otaibi, would gain infamy in 1979 when he led the Grand Mosque Seizure. (Note: The origins of this event with the Ikhwan dissenters are described in multiple sources, though Lacey 2009 contains one of the most up-to-date accounts. For more information on the Grand Mosque Seizure itself, see The Siege of Mecca by Yaroslav Trofimov.)

=== Proclamation of the Kingdom of Saudi Arabia ===
From 1927 to 1932, Ibn Saud administered the two main portions of his realm, Nejd and the Hejaz, as separate units. On 23 September 1932, Ibn Saud proclaimed the union of his dominions into the Kingdom of Saudi Arabia. Ibn Saud's eldest son Saud became crown prince in 1933.

== Aftermath ==
=== Annexation of Asir ===
The region of Asir, in what is today southern Saudi Arabia, had been under Ottoman rule from 1871 until the outbreak of the World War I, at which point its emir, Hasan ibn Ali Al Aid, "became virtually independent" and attempted to rule from Abha. However, a struggle ensued between his forces and those of Muhammad ibn Ali al-Idrisi, who eventually set up the short-lived Emirate of Asir under Saudi tutelage. The emirate was subsumed by the Saudi state following a 1930 treaty which provided for the territory to come under Ibn Saud's direct control upon its emir's death. The Emirate was eventually incorporated into the Kingdom of Saudi Arabia in 1934.

=== Saudi–Yemeni War ===
With the disintegration of the Ottoman Empire, a Zaidi state was forged in Yemen under Imam Muhammad bin Yahya Hamid ad-Din and his descendants. The Yemenis claimed parts of Asir and came to blows with the Saudis in 1933. Writing in the American journal Foreign Affairs in 1934, historian Hans Kohn noted, "Some European observers have wished to explain the armed conflict as a conflict between British and Italian policy in Arabia." Despite British ties to Saudi Arabia and Italian ties to Yemen, he concluded that "the rivalry between the two rulers is in no way caused or fostered by the rivalry of the two European states." However, in 1998, Alexei Vasiliev wrote, "The imam was instigated both by the Italians, who promoted assistance in order to increase their influence in Yemen, and by the British, who wished to detract Imam Yahya's attention from their protectorates in Aden." The Saudis struck back, reaching the Yemeni port of Hodeidah before signing a "treaty of Muslim friendship and Arab brotherhood" in Taif, which was published simultaneously in Mecca, Sanaa, Damascus, and Cairo to highlight its pan-Arabism.

Remarking on the implications of the treaty, which stated "that [the two parties'] nations are one and agree to consider each other's interests their own", Kohn wrote, "The foreign policy of both kingdoms will be brought into line and harmonized so that both countries will act as one country in foreign affairs. Practically, it will mean a protectorate over the Yemen by Ibn Saud, the stronger and much more progressive partner." Relations indeed remained close until civil war erupted in Yemen in the 1960s, at which time the country became a staging ground for battle between conservative values and those of the Egyptian revolutionary Gamal Abdel Nasser.

== See also ==
- Geography of Saudi Arabia
- History of Saudi Arabia
- Saudi Arabia–United Arab Emirates border
- Saudi Arabian–Kuwaiti neutral zone
- Saudi Arabian–Iraqi neutral zone
- Uqair Protocol of 1922

== Footnotes ==
[A]. Unification of Saudi Arabia (combined casualties figure estimation 7,989–8,989+) of:

== Sources ==
- Almana, Mohammed (1982). Arabia Unified: A Portrait of Ibn Saud. London: Hutchinson Benham. ISBN 978-0-09-147290-0.
- Commins, David (2006). The Wahhabi Mission and Saudi Arabia. London, New York: I.B. Tauris. ISBN 978-1-84511-080-2.
- Helms, Christine Moss (1981). The Cohesion of Saudi Arabia. Baltimore: The Johns Hopkins University Press.
- Kohn, Hans (October 1934). "The Unification of Arabia". Foreign Affairs. 13 (1): 91–103. doi:10.2307/20030644. JSTOR 20030644.
- Lacey, Robert (2009). Inside the Kingdom: Kings, Clerics, Modernists, Terrorists, and the Struggle for Saudi Arabia. New York: Viking. ISBN 978-0-670-02118-5.
- Lacey, Robert (1982). The Kingdom. New York: Harcourt Brace Jovanovich. ISBN 0-15-147260-2.
- Madawi Al-Rasheed (2002). A History of Saudi Arabia. Cambridge: Cambridge University Press. ISBN 978-0-521-64412-9.
- Mikaberidze, Alexander (2011). Conflict and Conquest in the Islamic World: A Historical Encyclopedia. ABC-CLIO. ISBN 978-1-59884-336-1.
- Troeller, Gary (1976). The Birth of Saudi Arabia: Britain and the Rise of the House of Sa'ud. London: Routledge. ISBN 0-7146-3062-4.
- Vassiliev, Alexei (1998). The History of Saudi Arabia. London: Saqi. ISBN 0-86356-935-8.
