= Battle of Sabilla =

1929 battle during the unification of Saudi Arabia

- Part of the Ikhwan revolt
Date	29–31 March 1929
Location	Sabilla
Result	Hejaz and Nejd victory

Belligerents
Ikhwan	Hejaz and Nejd

Commanders and leaders
(Ikhwan) Sultan bin Bajad (Ikhwan) Faisal al-Duwaish (WIA)	(Kingdom of Hejaz and Nejd) Abdulaziz al-Saud

Strength
Between 8,000–10,000	30,000

Casualties and losses
Between 500–1,000	200

The Battle of Sabilla (29–31 March 1929) was the main battle of the Ikhwan revolt in northern Arabia between the rebellious Ikhwan forces and the army of Abdulaziz al-Saud. It was the last tribal uprising in Arabia. It was also the last major battle in which one side rode camels, as the Ikhwan emphasized radical conservatism and shunned technological modernization.

The rebellious, but technologically mediocre, Ikhwan were decisively defeated by the Saudi forces, which had machine-guns and cavalry. The battle occurred in Sabilla, located twenty miles east of Al-Zulfi. The Saudi forces were also supported by the British Royal Air Force which bombed the Ikhwan forces near Jordan and Kuwait. It would be one of the last major battles in Arabia utilizing camel riders.

== Prelude ==
The Ikhwan had raided various regions bordering Arabia throughout the 1920s. While raiding was often a part of Bedouin life, the Ikhwan took it a step further: they would raze entire villages, and kill women and children they deemed to be insufficiently pious. This was done even against Ibn Saud's orders or instructions.

By the late 1920s, Saudi expansion had begun to slow down, and any territory not under the control of Ibn Saud was ruled by various foreign powers. The Ikhwan desired to expand into Iraq, Transjordan, Kuwait, and even further, but Ibn Saud refused. He not only realized the folly of engaging in war with the British, but was bound by the Treaty of Jeddah to recognize the borders of British-held territories. The Ikhwan took this as appeasing the non-Muslim British. Ibn Saud also desired to modernize his empire, which the Ikhwan opposed. The Ikhwan also opposed Ibn Saud's attempts to centralize his government, which they saw as threatening to tribal autonomy that had reigned in Arabia for so long, as well as tribal taxation. At last, in 1927, the Ikhwan rose up in open revolt against Saudi rule.

The Ikhwan were driven by a medieval Bedouin view of combat, in which two sides opposed one another and sought who would bear the greater courage and physical strength. By contrast, Ibn Saud was a religious but pragmatic leader, and had sought to upgrade doctrinal and technological innovation. This stark difference would come out in the battle to come.

== Battle ==
On March 29, the Ikhwan arranged a defensive array against the Saudis. Saudi forces attacked first, then appeared to withdraw. The Ikhwan, believing they had an opportunity, pursued. This was a trap. Previously hidden Saudi forces now revealed themselves, opening up with British-supplied automatic weapons. Included among these were automobile-mounted machine guns, which were used against the camels. The counterattack was crushed.

Faisal al-Dawish, one of the three leaders of the rebellious Ikhwan tribes, was wounded in the battle. According to Ibn Saud Information Resource, his injury was "serious". Another leader, Sultan bin Bajad, allegedly fled the battle scene. There are also reports stating that both Ikhwan leaders were arrested, but not executed.

== Aftermath ==
In the eyes of Ibn Saud's supporters, the battle was necessary for the ability to continue Saudi conquest of the peninsula. The Ikhwan regarded it as a massacre and a betrayal. Al-Dawish and Bin Bajad would remain in jail for the rest of their life. Bin Bajad himself would die in 1932.

Although skirmishes with the Ikhwan continued after Sabilla, the forces were for the most part decimated. The last few leaders of the Ikhwan would surrender at the Kuwaiti border to British forces. The remnants of the Ikhwan would go on to become the Saudi Arabian National Guard. The Saudi monarchy would not have another threat to its rule until the seizing of the Grand Mosque in 1979.
