= Paul Barril =

French military officer (1946–2026)

Paul Barril

Paul Barril (13 April 1946 – 20 October 2026) was an officer of the French Gendarmerie Nationale. He authored several books about his military career, touching sensitive political subjects of the Mitterrand era.

Barril was a gendarme until 1995. He was the second officer of the GIGN Special Forces unit for 10 years, before being involved in the creation of the Counterterrorist Cell of the Élysée during François Mitterrand's first mandate from 1981 to 1988. From then, he led several private security companies. He was in the centre of controversies for his role in Africa, particularly in Rwanda during the Rwandan genocide in 1994 during which extremist Hutus mass exterminated hundreds of thousands of ethnic Tutsis and moderate Hutus.

== Background ==
Paul Barril was born in Vinay, Isère, on 13 April 1946.

== Military career ==
Barril was second officer of the GIGN from 1974 to 1982, as aide to commandant Christian Prouteau. In late 1979, he was dispatched to Saudi Arabia to help the Saudi government quell the Grand Mosque Seizure, an uprising at Islam's holiest shrine in Mecca that was led by fundamentalist preacher Juhayman al-Otaibi. Barril was interim commander of the GIGN in 1982-1983, while commandant Prouteau was organising the GSPR, a presidential security unit. Barril claimed to having "arrested 115 people, being involved in the surrender of 61 madmen, neutralised 17 armed people without using weapons, and freed over 450 hostages".

After a car bomb explosion near a restaurant in Rue Marbeuf in Paris on 22 April 1982, Barril and Prouteau were involved in the creation of the Counterterrorist Cell of the Élysée, along with Prouteau.

That year, Barril was implicated in the "Irish of Vincennes" affair, in which he was alleged to have planted weapons and explosives in the apartment of Irish nationalists in France. The court case was dropped on technicalities in 2002. According to the New York Times, Barril said in 2000 on the television program Tout le monde en parle, "We did the operation. We prevented bloodshed. I don’t acknowledge anything, ever. I would do the same thing all over again."

Barril was also implicated in the Elysée wiretap scandal, in which dozens of persons were illegally wiretapped under the Mitterrand presidency. Barril's police record from 2011 is clean and shows no signs of conviction. The New York Times and RFI, however, assert that he received a six-month suspended sentence and a fine of 5,000 euros in 2005, and that the sentence was upheld on appeal.

== Private security business ==
After the "Irishmen from Vincennes" affair, in 1984, Barril created the company Epsylon in Paris.

Barril also led a company called SECRETS (for "Société d'Études de Conception et de Réalisation d'Équipements Techniques de Sécurité", "Society for Study, Design and Implementation of Technical Security Equipment") which offers security interventions in foreign countries.

In 1988, Barril organised an "action group" around President Félix Houphouët-Boigny in Côte d'Ivoire.

== Rwanda ==
Barril was involved in Rwanda during the first half of the 90s. He went to Kigali right after the plane ferrying president Juvénal Habyarimana was shot down, as the genocide started. Barril stated that he acted as a councilor to Habyarimana. He was contacted in 1989 for a reorganisation of the Rwandan intelligence services. Other sources refer to an audit of the Rwandan army in 1990.

He was also present in Kigali on 7 and 27 April 1994. Rumour has it that after Juvénal Habyarimana was assassinated, his widow, Agathe Habyarimana, hired Barril, via SECRETS company, to investigate the case. Barril declared to journalists of Le Monde and France 2 that he was in possession of the black boxes of the plane and promoted the thesis that the FPR (Rwandan Patriotic Front), led by the Tutsi Paul Kagame, was involved in the attack.

At the same time, on 20 May 1994, Barril was hired by the Hutu temporary government to recover a US$1.65 million payment made for canceled weapon imports.

== Death ==
In 2014, Barril told AFP that he was very ill, having been diagnosed with Parkinson's disease and thyroid cancer.

Barril died at his home in Antibes on 20 October 2026, aged 80.

== Bibliography ==
- Paul Barril, Missions très spéciales, Presses de la Cité, Paris, 1984.
- Paul Barril, Guerres secrètes à l'Élysée, Albin Michel, Paris, 1996.
- Paul Barril, L'enquête explosive, Flammarion, Paris, 2000.
- Paul Barril, Les archives secrètes de Mitterrand, Albin Michel, Paris, 2001.
- Alison Des Forges, Leave None to Tell the Story: Genocide in Rwanda, New York: Human Rights Watch, 1999, 789 pages. ISBN 1-56432-171-1
- Alison Des Forges Aucun témoin ne doit survivre, Karthala, Paris (version française de l'ouvrage précédent) ISBN 2-86537-937-X
- Patrick de Saint-Exupéry, L'inavouable, la France au Rwanda, Les Arènes, Paris. ISBN 2-912485-70-3
- Laure Coret et François-Xavier Verschave (Sous la direction de), L'horreur qui nous prend au visage - Rapport de la Commission d'enquête citoyenne, édition Karthala, ISBN 2-84586-620-8
- Benjamin Sehene Le Piège Ethnique, Éditions Dagorno, Paris, 1999 ISBN 2-910019-54-3
- Yaroslav Trofimov The Siege of Mecca: The Forgotten Uprising in Islam's Holiest Shrine and the Birth of Al Qaeda, (Doubleday, New York, 2007) ISBN 978-0-385-51925-0
