= Siege of Mecca =

Siege of Mecca may refer to:

- First Siege of Mecca (683) by the Umayyads under Yazid I
- Second Siege of Mecca (692) by the Umayyads under Abd al-Malik ibn Marwan
- Third Siege of Mecca (865) by Zaydi rebel Isma'il ibn Yusuf
- Grand Mosque seizure by the rebel Islamist 'al-Ikhwan' militia, led by Saudi dissident Juhayman al-Otaybi, in 1979
  - The Siege of Mecca by Yaroslav Trofimov, a nonfiction book concerning these events

== See also ==
- Battle of Mecca (disambiguation)
- Conquest of Mecca
- Sack of Mecca (930)
