= Al Hafirah =

Al Hafira or Al Hafirah may refer to:

- Al Hafirah, Ha'il, Saudi Arabia
- Al Hafirah, Al Madinah, Saudi Arabia
- Settlements of Otaibah: Al Hafira
