= Ikhwan raid on Busayya =

- Part of Ikhwan Revolt
Date	5 November 1927
Location	Al-Busayyah, Mandatory Iraq
Result	Inconclusive: Ikhwan destruction of a police fort near Al-Busayyah; Ikwan-Saudi failure to curb Iraqi military presence near Saudi Arabian–Iraqi neutral zone; Additional forts constructed and occupied by Iraqi troops; RAF bombing of Najd; Beginning of the Ikhwan Revolt

Belligerents
Ikhwan: Mutayr	Mandatory Iraq: 1 Police fort

Commanders and leaders
Faisal al-Duwaish	(Iraq) Faisal I

Strength
100 Mutayr tribesmen	~15 Iraqi policemen

Casualties and losses
20 killed	6 policemen killed

The Ikhwan raid on Busayya in Iraq occurred on 5 November 1927. Elements of the Ikhwan, mainly consisting of the Mutayr tribe under Faisal al-Duwaish, raided southern Iraq, clashing with Iraqi troops near Al Busayya This attack later became known as the beginning of the Ikhwan rebellion.

== Aftermath ==
Ikhwan tribesmen also raided Kuwait in January 1928. On both occasions (raids on Iraq and Kuwait) they looted camels and sheep, and though they raided brutally, they suffered heavy retaliations from the Royal Air Force and Kuwaitis.

== See also ==
- Ikhwan raids on Transjordan
- List of modern conflicts in the Middle East
