= Otaibah =

Arabian tribe

Otaiba عتيبة
- Ethnicity: Arabs
- Nisba: Al-Otaibi/العتيبي
- Location: Saudi Arabia; Kuwait; Qatar; Bahrain; United Arab Emirates; Jordan; Palestine
- Descended from: Banu Sa'd bin Hawazin
- Parent tribe: Banu Sa'd bin Hawazin
- Branches: Rog; Barqa; Banu Sa'd
- Language: Arabic
- Religion: Sunni Islam
- Surnames: 1 Alhaila; 2 dhabahat Al-hayil litamat Al-eayil

The Otaibah (Arabic: عتيبة, romanized: ʿUtayba, also spelled Otaiba, Utaybah) is one of the biggest Arabian tribes originating in the Arabian Peninsula. Their distribution spans throughout Saudi Arabia, especially in Najd and Hejaz. and the Middle East. The Otaibah trace back to the Mudar family and belong to the Qays ʿAylān confederacy through its previous name, Hawazin.

== Genealogy ==
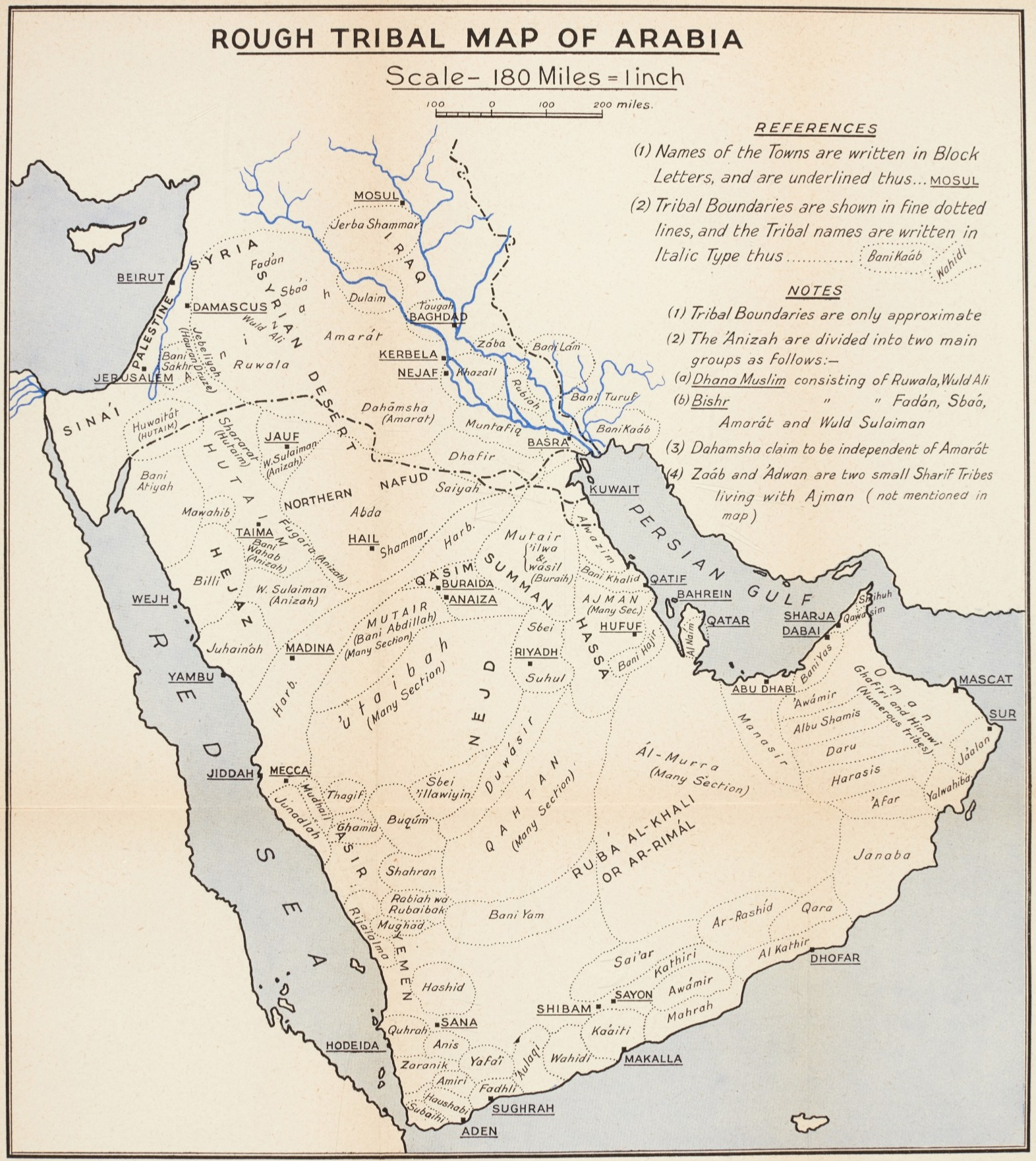
A map drawn by Harold Dixon showing the homes of the Arab tribes, including the Otaiba tribe

Research of the lineage of northern tribes may begin with Adnan (instead of Ishmael), as passed on by oral tradition. He is the common ancestor of the modern Otaibah, Annazah, Tamim, Abd al-Qays, and Quraysh tribes. Although Adnan is at the head of the tribal genealogy, genealogists and poets typically refer to two of his descendants: his son Ma'add (a later collective term for all north Arabian tribes) and his grandson Nizar, ancestor of Rabi'ah and Mudar.

Mudar, the son of Nizar, fathered ʿAylān al-Nās (the ancestor of Hawazin and Otaibah). The Hawazin is another tribe related to the Otaibah.

The tribe's common ancestors are Otaibah, Guzayah, Banu Jusham, Sa'd, Bakr, Hawāzin, Manṣūr, ʿIkrima, K̲h̲aṣafa, Qays ʿAylān, Mudir, Nijzar, Ma'add and Adnan of the Ishmaelites. The tribe is primarily found in Saudi Arabia, Kuwait, Qatar, and the United Arab Emirates. According to genealogy and oral tradition, the Otaibah tribe are descended from the pre-Islamic Hawazin. The Hawazin are descendants of the Qays ʿAylān (descendants of Ma'add [son of Adnan]) or the Adnanites, descendants of the Ishmaelites (the sons of Ishmael, the elder son of Abraham). The only known copy of historian and genealogist Hisham ibn al-Kalbi's 8th-century AD The Great Ancestrywas examined then verified in 1988 by Mahmud Firdous al Adm, who found portions of the manuscript in the research of Werner Caskel, a professor at the University of Berlin and the University of Cologne during the 1940s. According to the manuscript:

"Otaibah" is attributed to a standard; one of the banners that belong to the tribe of Hawazin. (The name derives from a man) and he is, Otaibah Ibn Guzayah Ibn Jusham Ibn Mu'awiya ibn Bakr Ibn Hawazin. The clans (subdivisions) of Hawazin all united under one of his descendants in an early time during the first centuries; other nations from Hawazin intertwined around him (as well). After most of the clans of Hawazin departed (resettled away) from the land of Hejaz and Najd to the (great and) wide lands of God. To the Sham (the Levant), Iraq, Egypt, the farthermost western lands (North Africa), the lands of Persia, and its surrounding Persian territories. None was left of them except those who could not leave their land and country. Those who remained, formed the largest Hawazin alliance in our present time, and it was named Otaibah.

Other works by al-Kalbi include the Book of Idols and The Abundance of Kinship. According to the latter, "The descendants of Jusham Ibn Mu'awiya ibn Bakr Ibn Hawazin are Guzayah, Oday, Ouseema. The sons of Guzayah are Juda'aa, Hami, Otaibah, and Outwara." Ibn Kathir wrote in his 14th-century book, The Beginning and the End:

There is no doubt that Adnan is from the lineage of Ishmeal, the only fact that is disagreed upon (or being disputed) is the number of ancestors between the two. Most of what was said (and known) is that the exact number is forty fathers between Adnan and Ishmeal, and this is (largely) based on what is written among the Christian and Jewish people, who know it from Baruch (the Israelite scribe, disciple, and secretary of Jeremah) writer of The Book of Jeremiah ... And Abu Jafar Al Tabari, and others, have concluded that the almighty God had sent to Jeremiah son of Hilkiah a revelation to go to (the King of Babylon) Nebuchadnezzar (II) and inform him that the almighty God has given him authority over the (ancient) people of Arabia (the Qedarites). God then commanded Jeremiah to take Ma'add son of Adnan (far away from the imminent conflict) on (a horse). So that he, (Ma'add), will not be afflicted by any resentfulness (since the victims cursed by the evils of Nebuchadnezzar were his people). (As the command stated) For I, the almighty God, will bring forth from him (Ma'add son of Adnan) a generous prophet, and the last among prophets. Jeremiah accepted the request, and carried Ma'add to the land (known as) the levant, where he grew among the sons of Israel; the few whom survived after the destruction of the Temple in Jerusalem ... The scribe who wrote the Book of Jeremiah, Baruch, transcribed the genealogy of his master (and devoted friend) to have it preserved (with the books) in the library of Jeremiah, and to save the lineage of Ma'add (perhaps for posterity and future generations), but God only knows (the exact truth). This is the reason why Mailk (a primary scholar of prophetic traditions in the 8th century) disliked tracing the lineage to before Adnan (or attempt to name any of forefathers of Adnan, other than Ishmael himself, because no truthful or precise record exists of these ancestors, save the Book of Jeremiah).

The tribes of the northern Arabian Peninsula are descended from Ishmael. They are seldom referred to as the Ishmaelites, however, but are more often described as the Qays ʿAylān. The southern tribes are descended from Qahtan, also known as Qahtanites. During the Umayyad era, a feud began between them. Scottish historian W. Montgomery Watt wrote that "to constitute something like a political party", the tribes began to identify the people of the Arabian Peninsula as Qays ʿAylān or Qahtan. The rivalry led to open conflict during the Second Muslim Civil War (680–692).

Most Otaibah genealogy is oral tradition dating to the Middle Ages and earlier. Muhammad's foster mother, Halimah al-Sa‘diyah, was from the Banu Sa'd tribe (a subdivision of the Hawazin, the Otaibah parent tribe.

The lineage of the Otaibah tribe varies among scholars; some attribute the tribe to the sons of the Banu Sa'd ibn Hawazin, and others say that they are composed of the Banu Jusham ibn Muawiya ibn Bakr ibn Hawazin or the Banu 'Amir ibn Sa'sa'ah ibn Muawiyah ibn Bakr ibn Hawazin. Despite differing accounts regarding the origin of the Otaiba tribe, most genealogists trace their lineage back to the Hawazin tribe, specifically the Banu Sa'd ibn Bakr.

== History ==
=== Ottoman Empire (late 15th century to 1900) ===
According to Ibn Fahd al-Makki, in 1470 the Sharif of Mecca Muhammad ibn Barakat attacked Otaiba in eastern Ta'if.

During the 16th century, the Ottomans added the Red Sea and Persian Gulf coast to their empire. They claimed rule of the interior as their central authority waxed and waned. In the 18th century, the Mutayr (aided by the Qahtan) began a series of wars against the Anazzah for the pastures of central Najd and forced the Anazzah north. The Mutayr and Qahtan were superseded by the Otaibah, who remain the largest tribe in central Najd.

During the late 18th and early 19th centuries, Otaibah and Ḥarb were counterparts in the centuries-long struggle among the Sharifs of Mecca and the ruling families of Ibn Rashid and Ibn Saud for Najd. Nineteenth- and early-20th-century Otaibah history reflects the wars in Najd and Hejaz, whose belligerents tried to enlist the tribe's support. In 1816, the Wahhabi kingdom was defeated by the Egyptians. Their leader, Ibrahim Mohammed Ali, persuaded the Otaibah and several Anazzah tribes to assist him against Abdullah bin Saud. Between 1842 and 1872, nine powers (including the Otaibah) were at war in Najd. In 1872, Otaibah chief Muslit bin Rubayan attacked western settlements of Riyadh. Saud bin Faisal immediately made a retaliatory raid on their territory, in which he was defeated and critically wounded. In 1881 and 1882, the Otaibah plundered camps of Harb tribes who were subjects of Ibn Rashid. They unsuccessfully attacked Rashid in the summer of 1883. Members of the House of Saud joined Grand Sharif of Mecca Awn Al-Rafiq in 1897, and undertook campaigns against Ibn Rashid with Otaibah aid.

The tribal war between Otaibah and Ibn Rashid began after a comment by the Otaibah poet Mukhlad Al-Qthami to Rashidi leader

Muhammed Ibn Abdullah at his court (translated from a bedouin dialect of Arabic):

We are the Otaibah. Oh, how many warriors we've slain
Because our legions are a steady team.

=== Early 20th century ===
The Ottoman Empire continued to control the Western coasts of Tihamah. However, Arabia had its own rulers: a group of tribal chiefs in Najd and its surrounding area, and the Sharif of Mecca ruled Mecca. Otaibah cooperated with Al Saud of Najd, but sided with the Sharifs of Mecca (who took refuge with the tribe in times of adversity).

During World War I in 1915, Ibn Saud began an ambitious plan to settle the nomadic tribes in his territory (which included Najd and the east coast of Arabia. This was accomplished with the indoctrination of the tribes in religious ideals by Muhammad ibn Abd Al-Wahhab, since the nomadic Arab Bedouin (including the Otaibah) were not considered religious. In 1916, with British support, Sharif of Mecca Hussein bin Ali led a revolt against the Ottoman Empire to create a united state. The Arab Revolt of 1916–1918 failed, but the Allied victory in World War I resulted in the end of Ottoman control of Arabia.

ʿAbd ai-ʿAzīz began to establish settlements known as al-Hid̲j̲ar (singular hid̲j̲ra ), followed by Sultan bin Bajad Al-Otaibi of Nad̲j̲d in promoting the settlement of Saudi Arabia's people during the first quarter of the century. This was accompanied by the Ikhwan (the Brethren), a political, military, and religious movement. ʿAbd ai-ʿAzīz, its founder, attempted to kindle religious enthusiasm among the rarely-pious and often-unpredictable tribes as a start for the reclamation and control of his domain.

The spread of religious enlightenment by the muṭawwiʿūn (preachers) prepared the idea of an agricultural, settled life, and the first (and most successful) settlement was established in 1912 by the Mutayr tribe. This settlement was soon followed by another by the Otaibah. Their inhabitants were members of Ikhwan. An important cause and new religious regulations, standards, and principles helped nomadic people leave their desert-dwelling culture and begin to live in groups, giving birth to a number of societies. The conflict with Āl Ras̲h̲īd of Ḥāʾil and the Sharifs in Mecca drove the process of settlement further, leading to about 130 such colonies across Arabia.

Although efforts were made to bring different tribes together in a single settlement to end feuding, most of the settlements became associated with specific tribes. According to lists compiled by Oppenheim and Caskel, the Ḥarb had 27 settlements, the Otaibah 19, the Muṭayr 16, the Ajman 14, the Shammar nine and the Qahtan eight. The hid̲j̲ras were in Najd and on Arabia's east coast. They reached the edge of the al-Rubʿ al-K̲h̲ālī desert in the south, and the Syrian Desert in the north. In the west, they extended to the mountains of Hejaz and Asir.

Otaibah Sultan ibn Bjad and Eqab bin Mohaya enlisted in the Ikhwan movement, and were deployed by Ibn Saud against regional rivals. They led tribal forces in the occupation of Al-Hasa, Ha'il, Al-Baha, Jizan, Asir, Ta'if, Mecca, and Jeddah. This was considered a significant contribution in gaining control of the Hejaz region. After several victories, some Ikhwan factions resented policies which appeared to favor modernization and an increased number of non-Muslim foreigners in the region. Some Ikhwan members became more zealous than their founder, and turned against him.

Sultan ibn Bjad joined leaders of other tribes in revolt in December 1928; Eqab bin Mohaya led his Otaibah tribe to aid King Abdul Aziz and vanquish the threat. Eqab and his followers were not the only members of the tribe to ally with the young king the revolution was doomed when a large Otaibah faction (Roug, under the command of Omar bin Rubayan) chose loyalty to Ibn Saud.

In 1926, the inhabitants of Najd and Hejaz gave their allegiance ( bayʿa ) to ʿAbd al-ʿAzīz. He accepted the title of king ( malik ) the following year and ruled the central and provincial governments, authorized by Islamic legal scholars ('ʿulamāʾ') and Sharia law. Factions of the Ikhwan tribes (particularly the Mutayr, Otaibah and Ajman) supported the preservation of their chiefdoms—including the tribes’ choice of markets, raiding, and political affiliations—but were defeated in a series of battles during 1929 and 1930. Political opposition, including political parties, was subsequently forbidden. Centralization was apparent in economic change beginning in 1924, when ʿAbd al-ʿAzīz began to use taxation and pilgrimage income to build a central treasury. During this period, raids into neighbouring states were forbidden.

On 29 March 1929, the revolution was suppressed at the Battle of Sabilla. After the defeat, another battle took place between two branches of the Otaibah tribe: Barka and Roug. The rebellious Barka branch fled under Sultan ibn Bjad, one of their three leaders. He and his men were defeated and captured at D̲j̲abala by ʿUmar Ibn Rubayʿān, in command of al-Roug elements loyal to the king. Ibn Bjad was later taken prisoner. In the final crushing of the Ikhwan rebellion in 1930, some settlements were completely destroyed. The king then created the nucleus of a modern, standing army, which proved its worth in establishing peace. On 23 September 1932, the Kingdom of Saudi Arabia was established in a successful unification of a large portion of the peninsula.

=== Mid-20th to early 21st century ===
Early in the kingdom's history, a House of Supplies provided food for the people. A harsh manager was memorialized by Shammar poet Hamad Al Rukhees:

Oh (my) creator bestow ease (upon me) and (let me) Certainly (our future) days will (soon) be relieved as the free (falcon) gets full out of its own claw (hard effort and work).

Late in the 20th century, King Faisal Al Saud was strongly supported by the Otaibah. When the king was crown prince (between 1953 and 1964), the Otaibah were warring with the Mutayr over land near the city of Ta'if. One spring, a committee was formed by the government to legally prohibit either tribe from occupying the land until the issue was resolved. Faisal Al Saud went to the source of the conflict to resolve it. He saw a roaming Otaibah shepherd herding sheep and camels and asked him, "Who are you?" The shepherd replied, "I am from the Otaibah tribe". The crown prince then said, "Very good. Take these verses of mine to your people, and they will know its meaning":

Oh son of Otaibah, what say him (when) his mother's cheek (the land) was being defiled (by conflict)?
In the core of all knowledge are solutions; (therefore), take this message, take it (to them).

With the poem, the crown prince emphasized that the land (their mother) was being defiled by the conflict. The shepherd said, "All right. I will take it to them, but I do not know who it is from (or who is its sender)". The crown prince replied, "The person speaking to you is Faisal Ibn Abdul Aziz". The shepherd responded, "A name significantly acknowledged and greatly praised; however, please take its response in verse":

Oh, greetings to the greatest of all solutions (manifested). If (we knew) Faisal was against it (the conflict)
We (the Otaibah) would evacuate the land. Take (accept) this message, take it.
And my mother (the land) is like an elderly woman; rosy (gentle in essence), white (unspoiled) and clean is her cheek.
And (alongside) your mother (Arabia), succeeded only by the strongest of kings, take this message, take it.

The conflict ended soon afterwards. During the early 21st century, many Otaibah enlisted in Saudi Arabia's armed forces (particularly in the Saudi National Guard).

==== Great Mosque of Mecca siege ====
Otaibahs Juhayman al-Otaybi, his brother-in-law, Mohammed Abdullah al-Qahtani (reportedly the Mahdi) and hundreds of their followers seized the Great Mosque of Mecca on 20 November 1979. Although the rebels included Egyptians, Pakistanis and American converts, most were Saudi Otaibahs. The Grand Mosque seizure lasted until 4 December and resulted in the deaths of many civilian hostages, Saudi security personnel and most of the rebels, including Muhammad al-Qahtani. Juhayman and 67 of his fellow rebels who survived the assault were captured and publicly beheaded. Many rebels evaded capture and fled. In response to the seizure of the mosque, King Khalid bin Abdulaziz Al Saud gave more power to religious conservatives and ulamas. He reportedly believed that "the solution to the religious upheaval was simple: more religion." Newspaper photographs of women were banned, followed by women on television. Cinemas and music shops were shut down. The educational curriculum was changed to provide many more hours of religious studies, eliminating classes on subjects such as non-Islamic history. Gender segregation was extended "to the humblest coffee shop", and the religious police became more assertive.

== Tribal branches ==
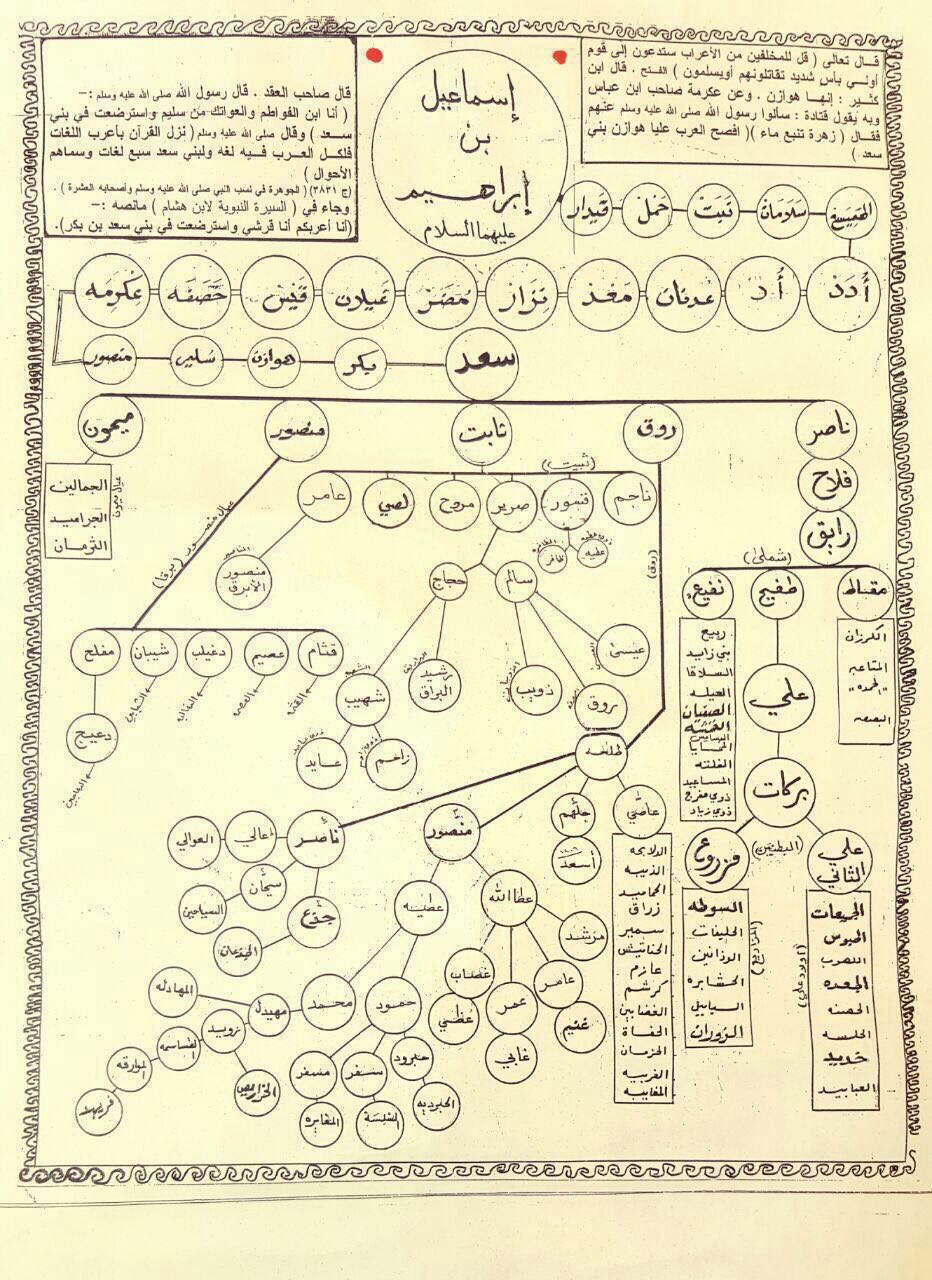
Otaibah branches in a number of countries

The Otaibah tribe is divided into three major branches: Barga (Arabic: برقا), Rog (روق) and of them Al-Hafah (الحفاه), and Banu Saad (Sons of Saad, بنو سعد). Each branch is divided into a number of clans, and each clan is divided into families.

== Notable people ==
Among the tribe's members are:

- Eqab bin Mohaya
- Juhayman al-Otaybi
- Sultan bin Bajad Al Otaibi, one of the leaders of the Ikhwan movement
- Husain Sirhan, saudi poet
- Mutlaq Hamid Al-Otaibi, Saudi Arabian writer and poet
- Khalid A. Al-Falih, Former Minister of Investment of Saudi Arabia
- Turki bin Hamid, a Sheikh and a Knight of the Otaiba tribe

== See also ==
- Settlements of Otaibah
- Tribes of Arabia
- Sultan bin Bajad Al-Otaibi
- Banu Sa'd
- Malik ibn Awf
- Hawazin
