= Battle of Jabal Shammar (1929) =

Civil conflict in Arabia

- Part of Ikhwan revolt
Date	August 1929
Location	Kingdom of Hejaz and Nejd
Result	Saudi victory

Belligerents
Ikhwan	Hejaz and Nejd

Commanders and leaders
(Ikhwan) Azaiyiz bin Faisal †	(Kingdom of Hejaz and Nejd) Nida bin Naheer †

Strength
500 men	1,500 men

Casualties and losses
450 killed	500 killed
- 1,000 killed

The Battle of Jabal Shammar, or Battle of Umm Radh'ma (Arabic: مَعْرَكَة أُمّ رَضْمَة, romanized: Maʿrakat Umm Raḍmah), took place in August 1929, between a raiding rebellious Ikhwan party and the ally tribes of Ibn Saud. It was the second largescale engagement of the Ikhwan revolt in Arabia. The rebel Ikhwan tribesmen were defeated by the pro-Saudi forces.

== Scope of the battle ==
After the defeat in Sabillah, Ikhwan tribesmen and government troops clashed again in the Jabal Shammar region, in August 1929, resulting in the deaths of some 1,000 men.

According to Ibn Saud Information Resource, the battle, fought between Ikhwan raiders under command of Azaiyiz, son of Faisal al-Dawish, and the Saudi forces of Shammar tribesmen, under the leadership of Nida bin Naheer, was "furious" and "many fell". The Ikhwan movement suffered many more casualties than the Shammer, and Nida from the Shammar fell in the battle.

== See also ==
- Emirate of Jabal Shammar
- Ikhwan raids on Transjordan
