= Settlements of Otaibah =

Places of residence of the Arabian Otaibah tribe

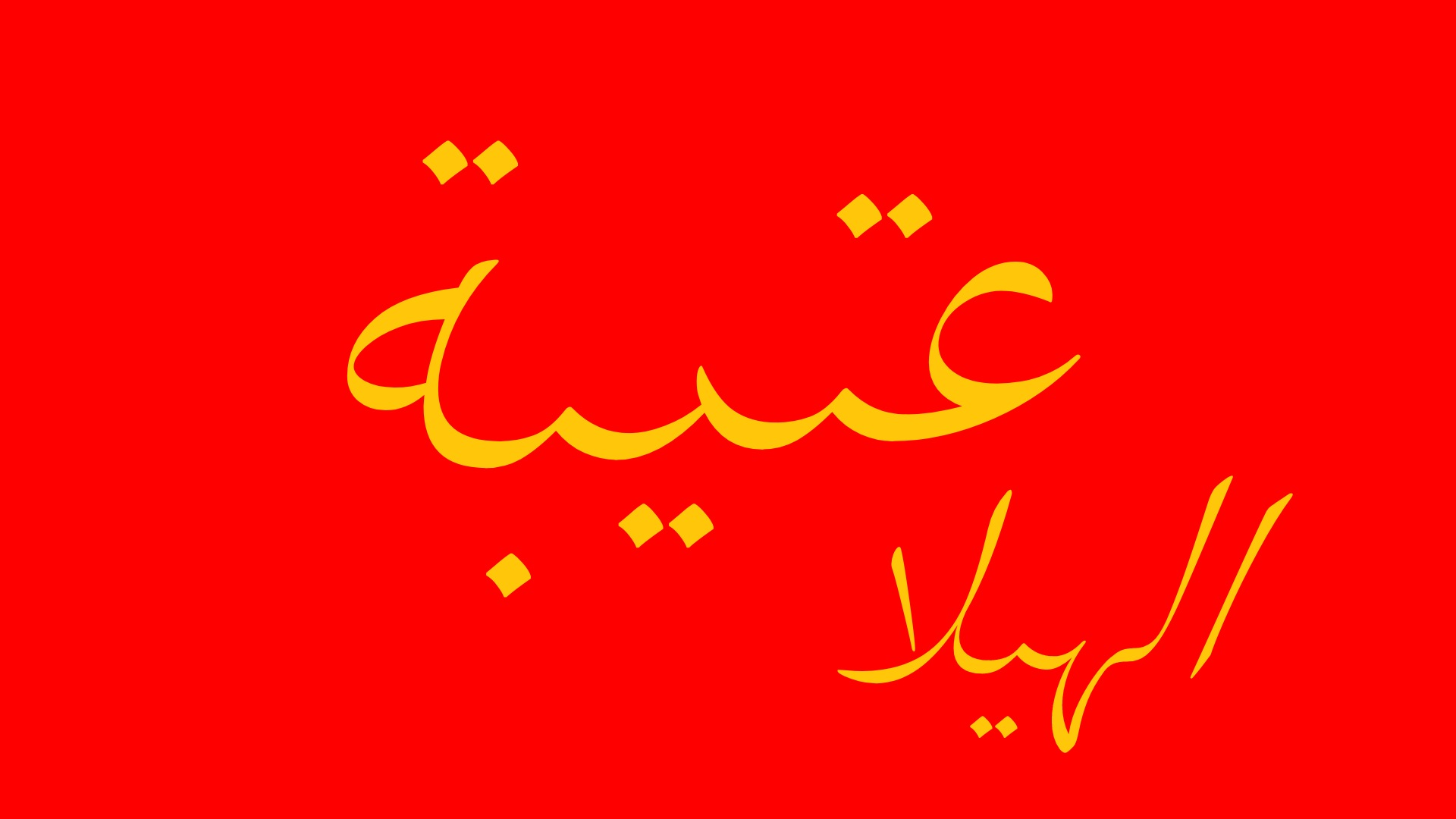
The flag of the Otaiba tribe with its famous nickname (Al-Hilla) written on it.

Also known as Hujer (singular Hijra). The indoctrination of the tribe Otaibah into religious ideologies imposed by Muhammad ibn Abd Al-Wahhab, along with the accompanying religious, political, and military movement, pushed the nomadic tribes of Arabia, including Otaibah, out of the desert and into settlements. These settlements played a major role in the modernization its inhabitants. In the early 20th to 21st century, the following were the most important settlements of the tribe of Otaibah in the Arabian Peninsula.

== Al-Ghata'at ==
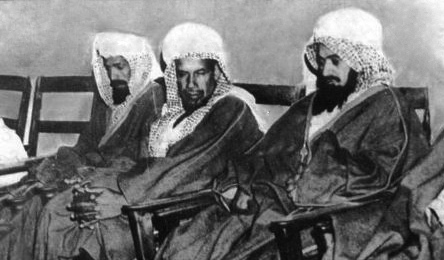
Nafi 'ibn Fadhliah (left) from the Harb tribe, Mutlag ibn al-Juba'a (center) from the Mutayr tribe, and Majid ibn Khathayla (right) from the Otaiba, circa 1938.

Al-Ghata'at is considered the oldest and the most important settlement of the Ikhwan movement and the most significant in the preparation of soldiers, as described by the brother of King Abdul Aziz Ibn Saud, Prince Saud Ibn Abdul Rahman Al Saud in the book of "The Saudis and the Islamic Solution." It was completely destroyed after the Battle of Sabilla. Up until Majid ibn Khathayla asked King Abdul Aziz to allow him to live there. The king allowed the construction of a new town in a close proximity to it. Al-Ghata'at is located west of Al-Muzahmiyah Governorate, near the Riyadh/Taif Expressway.

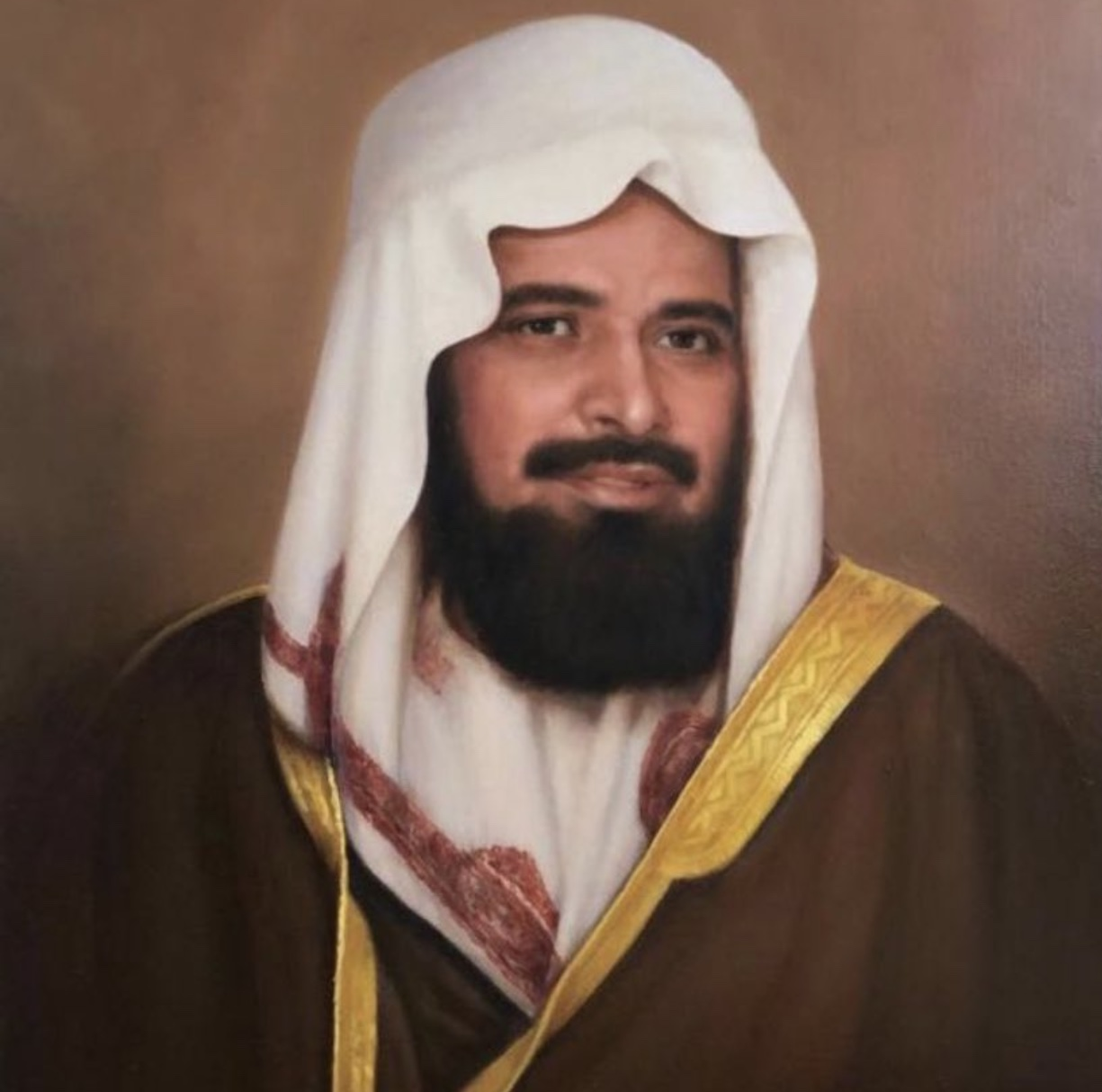
Majid bin Khulaila Al-Otaibi.

== Al Hafira ==
An old water fetching site of the Pre-Islamic era, it was the first settlement for the Da'ajeen of the tribe of Otaiba. Its founder is Prince Manahi bin Khalid bin Hasher al-Hidal founded the settlement in 1919. When he died in 1939, his son Sajdi took responsibility of the settlement until 1968. He was then followed by a grandson, Manahi, who remained a governor over its domain until his death in 2001. Its supervising officer in the early 21st century is Sheikh Sajdi bin Manahi bin Sajdi bin Manahi bin Khalid al-Hidal. The settlement has been mentioned by many historians and was considered an Otaibah settlement since its conception. Its families and clans included Zamil, Mana, Faraj, Rihani and Zarkali. This settlement is characterized by its proximity to the province of Dawadmi, which is only 48 km away. Also, it is about 80 km away from Al-Quweiyya Governorate, and about 200 km away from the capital city of Riyadh. Furthermore, there are some mining sites in Al-Ridiniyat area of Al-Hafira.

== Al Dahina ==
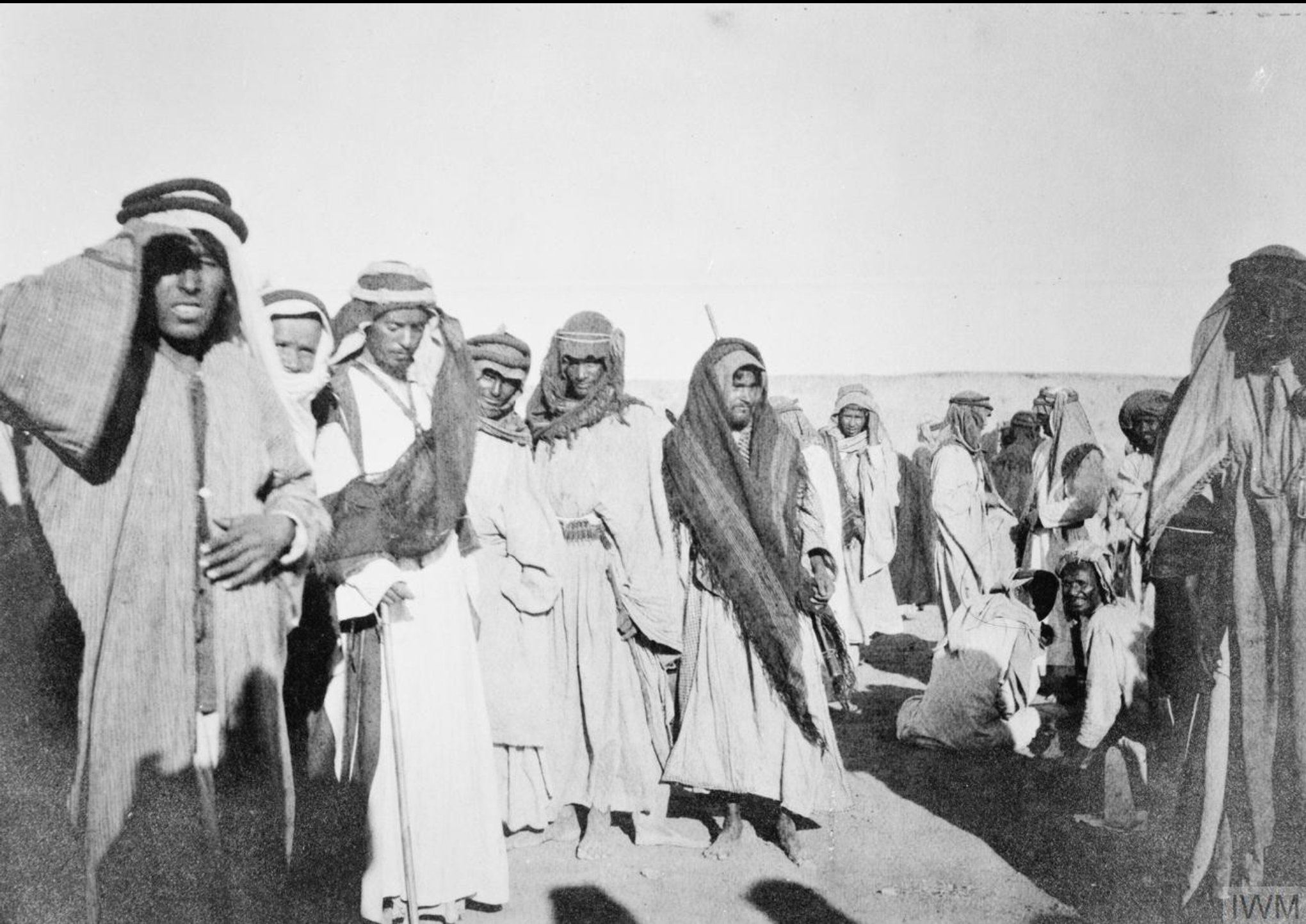
Members of the Otaiba tribe in the Great Arab Revolt of 1917, photographed by British officer Stuart Newcomb.

This settlement was established in 1913 as Sheikh Abdul Rahman bin Rabian, along with some of the tribes of Otaibah settled in the location. The settlement was then taken over by Sheikh Omar bin Rabian, who was exiled by order of King Abdul Aziz Ibn Saud, and was occupied only by a group of Thoi Thubat of the tribe of Otaibah after the Battle of Sabilla. The most significant of its governors are Sultan bin Mohammed bin Sultan bin Muthekir bin Halis. In the early 21st century, the settlement was received by his son Salal bin Sultan bin Halis. After his death, the settlement was then received by Sheikh Dhuar bin Sultan bin Halis, and after him, Sheikh Sultan bin Thar bin Halis. Some archeological sites still exist around the location; such as an old mosque that was said to have been occupied by two thousand fighters led by Sheikh Omar bin Abdul Rahman bin Rabian before participating in the Battle of Sabilla. Also, some ancient artifacts have been found in the location. A rock with prehistoric markings and drawings on it called the rock of Rashid Al Khalawi.

== Al Sajir ==
It is in the territory of the Al Sir, located to the northeast of the province of Dawadmi at 120 km away. It was founded by Fihan bin Nasser bin Braz bin Muhayya in 1914. When Fihan bin Nasser died, Aqab bin Daif Allah Ibn Ghazi Ibn Muhayya took his place. It was considered to be the largest settlement of the Ikhwan movement. After the Battle of Sabilla, King Abdul Aziz Ibn Saud, assigned Eid Ibn Qablan Al-Hantushi to be the governor of Al Sajir. After him Nasser bin Germain bin Braz bin Muhayya was assigned. His successor, Turki Ibn Saddah bin Muhayya who then became a general in the Saudi National Guard. After him was his Metib bin Turki bin Muhayya, whom was considered the backbone of Sagir for during his time, the settlement witnessed many achievements and developments until he died in 1997. He was succeeded by his son Sheikh Nayef bin Metib bin Muhayya. It is worth mentioning that the Ibn Muhayya clan of the Otaibah tribe, are a few of the most famous tribal princes. Especially since many of which participated in conquests and invasions alongside King Abdul Aziz Ibn Saud. In the 21st century, Al Sajir is considered one of the largest cities of the tribe of Otaibah It is a city belonging to "Hanatish", one of the Otaiba tribes.

== Sinam ==
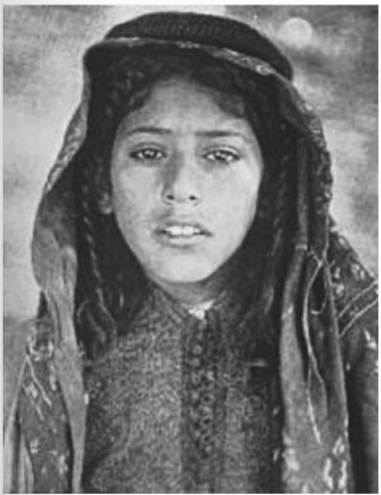
A picture of a boy from the Otaiba tribe in 1938.

Founded by Sheikh Sultan bin Mashaan Abba Al-Ula in 1914. Led by Sultan bin Mashaan Abba Al-Ula and Majid bin Jaza Abba Al-Ula. It is located near two valleys, the northern valley is called Al Dathma, and the southern valley is called Wadi Al-Arjan. In terms of location, it is located in the western side of the province of Quweia and about 70 km away, that is in the southwestern direction of the province. One of the main positions in the conquests of King Abdul Aziz was the Sinam Brigade led by Sultan bin Mashaan Abba Al-Ula. It was the heart of the battle of Turaba in 1918. Its governor in 21st century is Al Hineedi Omar Aba Abba Al-Ula.

== Arwa ==
Located in the Riyadh province of Saudi Arabia, it has an administrative center located south to the province of Dawadmi at about 99 km. Its area covers 84 km in width including its surrounding areas. It was founded by Sheikh Sultan Bin Mohammed Bin Hindi Bin Humaid and Sheikh Jahjah bin Bajad bin Humaid Al Otaibi in 1918. The chieftains of the settlement were Hashar bin Mugid bin Humaid, and Nayef bin Jahjah bin Humaid. The Al Mugata clan settled here, with a few other clans of Otaibah. Its governor in the 21st century is Sheikh Jahjah bin Nayef bin Humaid. Arwa is an ancient place known since the Jahiliyyah, and it overlooks a large mountain called Arwan.

== Nafi ==
Located north of the province of Dawadmi at about 90 km away, and 100 km from the province of Ras. It was inhabited by several tribes. It was headed by Prince Abdullah bin Sabil by order of His Majesty King Abdul Aziz Al Saud. It was then settled by Sheikh Turki Al-Ditt. After the Battle of Sabilla. Turki Al-Ditt ended up in prison for his participation in the revolt. It was established in 1928. The head of the center was Sheikh Omar bin Abdulrahman bin Turki bin Sultan bin Rabian. Considered the most famous Sheikh of Otaibah. Sheikh Omar bin Rabian participated in many invasions and conquests with King Abdul Aziz, including: Leith, Al Ragama, Battle of Sabilla, Najran, Wa'Dakh, Jubla. He remained a governor until he died in 1980. His successor was his son Sheikh Abdullah bin Omar bin Rabian. Its governor in the 21st century.

== Hulban ==
Hulban is one of the oldest counties of Najd where many Arab tribes lived in the Jahiliyyah and Islam. The name is derived from the notion that when the sheep and camels are milked, the area would be filled with milk. Located in the western part of the Riyadh province on the Riyadh/Makkah expressway, it is 290 km away from Riyadh. It is administered by the Qawaiya governorate. Its governors are Sheikh Majid bin Dawi bin Fahaid, Sheikh Nayef bin Dawi bin Fahaid, Sheikh Jahz bin Nayef bin Fahaid, Sheikh Faihan bin Hilal bin Fahaid, and Sheikh Faihan bin Jahaz bin Fahaid. The vast majority of the population of this center are from the clan of Shiabin and some other tribes and families.

== Al Heed ==
Established in 1924 by Nasser bin Jerman bin Muhayya, and Falah bin Sadah bin Muhayya. It was then ruled by Eqab Bin Muhayya after he took control until he died. After him was Turki Ibn Saddah bin Muhayya, and then his son Afas bin Aqab bin Muhayya who was there until his retirement in 1993. Its inhabitants are the Hanatish. Its prince in the 21st century is Sheikh Khalid ibn 'Ufas ibn Aqab bin Muhayya.

== Al Rawdah ==
Prince Majid Ibn Dawi Ibn Fahid was its governor since its establishment in the Arid region during 1918. Its population consisted of the Shibabin clan of the Otaibah tribe, as well as other group of tribes and clans.

== Aseela ==
Aseela is a settlement located northeast of the province of Dawadmi at about 95 km. The city of Sagir is about 13 km away. It was founded in 1916. Among its most famous governors are Nafel bin Tawaiq al Hofi, Ghazi Al Toum, and Abdulmohsen bin Ghazi Al Toum. Its governor in the 21st century is Saud bin Abdul Mohsen bin Ghazi Al Toum.

== Arja'a ==
Arja'a lies north of Dawadmi about 28 kilometers away. It was founded by a number of the Al Hamameed clan of the tribe of Otaibah, including Qatim al-Habil, Muqahim al-Habil, Ja'adan al-Habil, Ouad al-Hammadi and others. Established in 1918, its first governor was Qatim al-Habil, then Abdullah al-Subeik, then for the second time Qatim al-Habil, then Hanif bin Qatim al-Habil, then Mohammed bin Qatim al-Habil. Its governor in 21st century is Mansour bin Hanif bin Qatim al-Habil. The people of Arja supported King Abdul Aziz Ibn Saud.

== Musada ==
Located north of the province of Dawadmi at about 10 km; it was founded in 1926 by Sheikh Khaled bin Jameh, who continued to be the governor until he died. Then after him Saeed Al-Duwaikh was assigned, one of the Roussan clan. It was later abandoned by Sheikh Abdul Aziz bin Jameh, who moved to the Al Fawoj to become its governor in 1953. His successor was Sheikh Hadjan bin Mitrk bin Jameh, then his son, Metrk bin Hadjan Ibn Jamea. The later is its governor in 21st century. The people of Musada participated in the war in Yemen in 1933 with Prince Abdul Aziz bin Musaed, all of whom were of the Roussan clan, including the father of Metrk bin Hadjan Ibn Jamea.

== Al Jumaniyah ==
Al Jumaniyah is located to the east of Afif on the old road of Afif/Riyadh at about 65 km away from Afif governorate. It was founded by Sheikh Nayef bin Maraq Al Deet in 1929, who is considered to be one of the most famous tribal princes of Otaibah. He participated alongside King Abdul Aziz Ibn Saud in many conquests and battles. He remained a governor over the settlement until he died. He was then succeeded by his son, Turki bin Nayef Al Deet, followed by Saleh bin Nayef Al Deet, its governor in 21st century.

== Al Labib ==
It was established by order of King Abdul Aziz, and led by Sheikh Abdul Mohsen Al-Hidal. Its people greatly supported the King in his conquests. Friday prayers used to be conducted here by Imam Sheikh Abdullah bin Muhanna, who is the father of Sheikh Sulayman bin Muhanna, who was head of the Riyadh courts. Sheikh Abdul Mohsen Al-Hidal later moved to another settlement and resided there until he died in 1980. He was then succeeded by his son Sheikh Turki bin Abdul Mohsen bin Badr Al-Hidal until he died in 2010. Its governor in the 21st century in Sheikh Mohammed Bin Turki Bin Abdul Mohsen Al-Hidal.

== Orefejan ==
Located in the hills of Al-Muhammar, previously named "the Hills of Al Ashig." north west the city of Nafi at 30 km, and North of the city of Dawadmi. In 1927, a dispute, presumably over who has control, erupted between Omar bin Rabian and Miteb Al Shagar Al Dimasi in the city Nafi. Omar later asked King Abdul Aziz if he could stay indefinitely in Nafi, meaning he would have control there; the king agreed. Miteb on the other hand, asked the king to have control over Orefejan. The king agreed, and Miteb moved from Nafi to Orefejan and became its governor. Nasser Ibn Miteb Al Shagar Al Dimasi is its governor in 21st century. Services in the city include governmental agencies, primary healthcare services, middle and secondary schools for boys and girls, and it has opened a courtroom, a post office and a popular market which opens on Fridays. Also, paved roads, and street lighting. Most of its inhabitants are of the Damaseen and Al Asadi.

== Abu Jalal ==
Its founder was Mahmas bin Mohammed bin Nasser Al-Shaghar in 1925. Its current governor is Badr bin Mahmas bin Mohammed Al-Shaghar, who succeeded his brother Sultan Al-Shaghar after his death in 1969. The reason for its name is said to be man named Abu Jalal, who was murdered near a water supply in the region. The water supply is also named after him. Located near the Mkhammer Mountains, which is located near the mountain of Suag, between Dokhun and Dhiria. North west of the province of Dawadmi, at 150 km, and west of the city of Nafi at 40 km. Its inhabitants include the clans of Al Damas, Al Rougi, Al Aidan, and Al Ghabi.

== Qarareh ==
The name is derived from the fact that the location gathers water after rain. Located to the north of the mountains of Gal and Gul, south east of the mountains of Takhfa, and south west of Qassim. 60 km away from the city of Nafi, and about 120 km from Al Ris. It was established in 1928 by Sheikh Sultan Bin Mujahid Abu Sanon. Its governor in 21st century is Sheikh Bandar bin Alitha bin Sultan Abu Sanon. Its inhabitants are the clans of Al Harbadah from Thoi Atiya, Al Muzahama, Al Rougi.

== Al Rawidah ==
It is the first settlement of the Dagalbh from the Barqa branch of Otaibah. Its people supported Ibn Saud. Its founder, Jamal bin Mohammed Al-Muhri, the Sheikh of Al Dagalbh. In 21st century, its chief is Muhammad Bin Jamal Al-Muhri, and there are a number of schools at the settlement, plus a clinic, a health center, a post office, and a number of shops.

== Al Jimsh ==
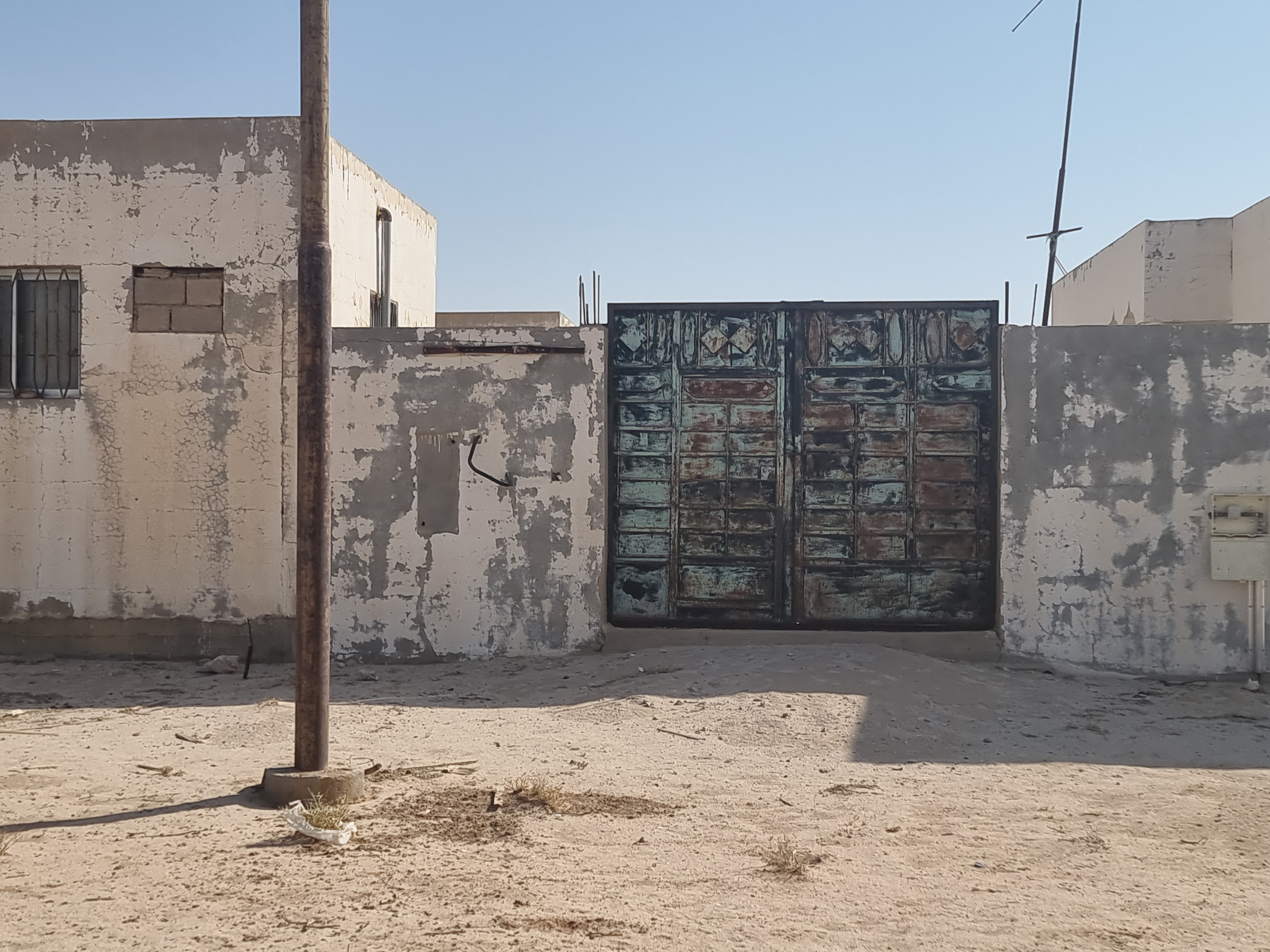
Rundown house in the Dalbahi settlement of Al-Thumamiyah.

Located north west of the Al-Dawadmi province, on the road between Al-Qassim and Mecca, at about 65 km. It is inhabited by a number of clans namely Al-Dalabahah, Al-Hizman, Al-Ghbayyat, Al-Ghadabin, Al Hanatish, Al-Hamameed, Al-Karashmah, Al-Mirashidah, Al-Aida, and Al-Eawazimu.

Most of the area of Al-Jimsh is inhabited by the Dalbahi clan. It is said the Dalabahah used to live in the town of Arja north of Al-Duwadimi with the Hamameed Clan, but after a dispute between the Hamameed and Dalabahah they migrated in a Hijra into Al-Jimsh. Sheikh Qahtam Bin Masead Al-Dalbahi was the one who established the town of Al-Qurayn, basing the location of the town around a water well. Eventually one of the first towns the Dalabahah migrated to was Al-Hayyt, which was already inhabited by the Hanatish clan with a small population of Dalabahah, but due to Al-Hayyt being well established during that time a number of Dalabahah moved into the town, becoming the majority. Shortly after the establishment of Al-Qurayn the town of Al-Rafayih was established by Sheikh Shuraym Bin Easay, over time other Dalabahah settlements would appear within the area making them the majority of the population.
