= Battle of Mecca =

The Battle of Mecca or Capture of Mecca may refer to:

- Battle of Mecca (883)
- Capture of Mecca (1813)
- Battle of Mecca (1916)
- Capture of Mecca (1924)

== See also ==
- Siege of Mecca (disambiguation)
- Conquest of Mecca
- Sack of Mecca
