= Ikhwan revolt =

1927 uprising in Arabia

- Part of the Unification of Saudi Arabia
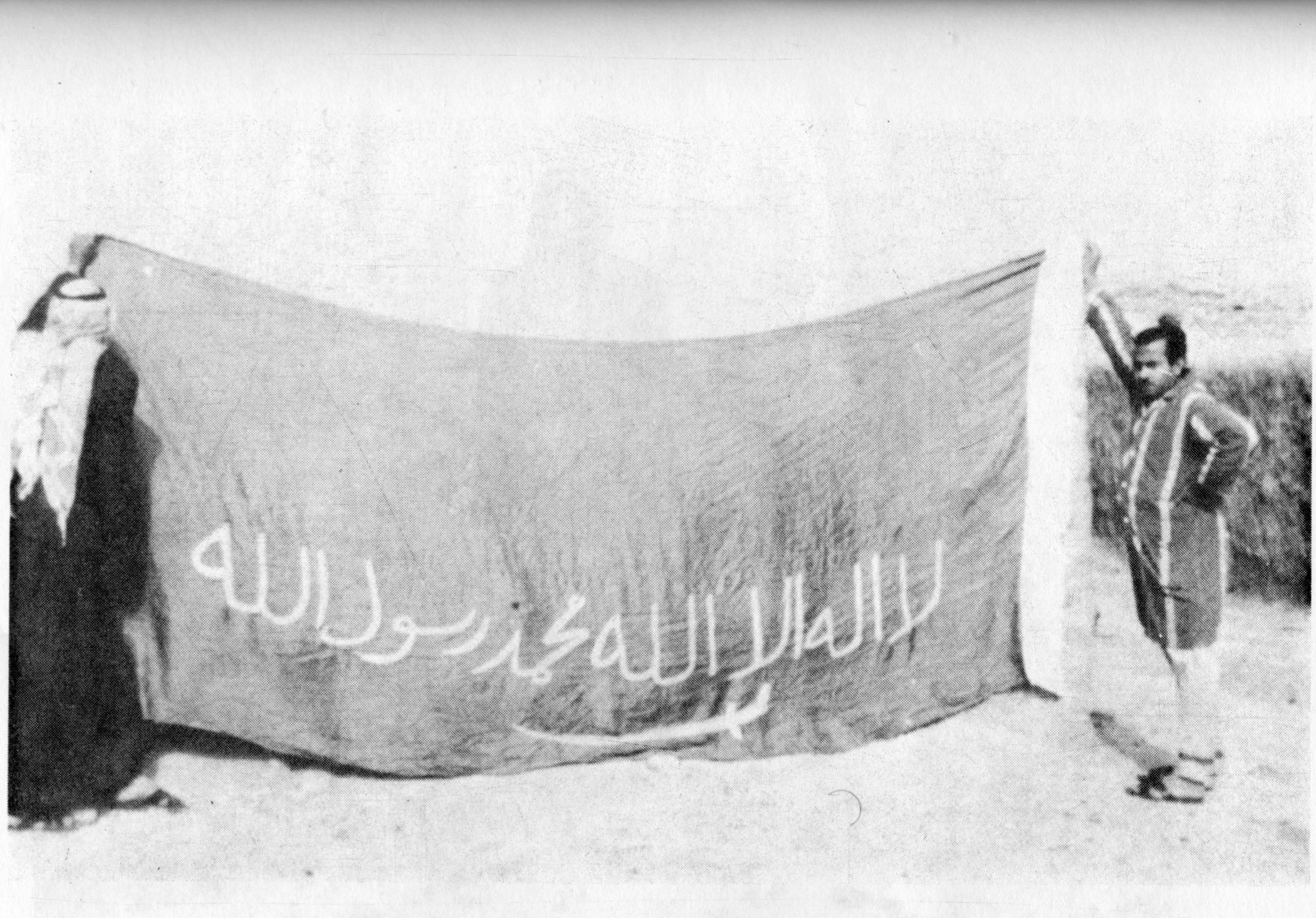
- Flag of Ikhwan
Date	1929–1930
Location	Nejd, Iraq, Kuwait
Result	Saudi victory; Unification of Saudi Arabia; Suppression of the Ikhwan Revolt; Dissolution of the Ikhwan

Belligerents
Ikhwan; Otaibah; Mutayr; Ajman	Hejaz and Nejd; House of Saud; Harb; Najdi Shammar; Mutayr factions; Al-Dhafeer; Anazah; & Allied Arab tribes; Kingdom of Iraq; Kuwait; United Kingdom

Commanders and leaders
(Ikhwan) Faisal bin Sultan (surrendered) (Ikhwan) Sultan bin Bajad (executed) (Ikhwan) Meqaid al-Duhainah †	(Kingdom of Hejaz and Nejd) Ibn Saud (Kingdom of Hejaz and Nejd) Fawzi al-Qawuqji (Kingdom of Hejaz and Nejd) Eqab bin Mohaya (Kingdom of Hejaz and Nejd) Faisal bin Abdulaziz (Kingdom of Hejaz and Nejd) Mubarak Al Azmi (executed)

Strength
47,000	30,000

Casualties and losses
500 in Battle of Sabilla; 450 in Jabal Shammar	200 in Battle of Sabilla; 500 in Jabal Shammar
- About 100 killed in the raids 700 killed in Sabilla; 1,000 killed in Jabal Shammar; 250 killed in raid on Awazim tribe 2,000 killed in total

The Ikhwan revolt was an uprising in the Arabian Peninsula from 1929 to 1930 led by the Ikhwan against Ibn Saud. In late 1927, the tribesmen of the Otaibah, Mutayr and Ajman launched cross-border raids into parts of Mandatory Iraq, challenging the authority of Ibn Saud. The relations between the House of Saud and the Ikhwan rebels gradually deteriorated into an open bloody feud by January 1929. The main rebel forces were defeated in the Battle of Sabilla, on 29 March 1929. Ikhwan tribal rebels and troops loyal to Ibn Saud clashed again in the Jabal Shammar region in August 1929, and Ikhwan tribesmen attacked the Awazim tribe on 5 October 1929.

Faisal al-Duwaish, the main leader of the rebellion and the Mutair tribe, fled to Kuwait in October 1929 before being detained by the British and handed over to Ibn Saud. Al-Duwaish would die in Riyadh on 3 October 1931 from an apparent heart condition. Government troops had finally suppressed the rebellion on 10 January 1930, when other Ikhwan rebel leaders surrendered to the British. In the aftermath, much of the Ikhwan leadership was killed or imprisoned, while the remaining rebels were gradually incorporated into regular Saudi units. Sultan bin Bajad, one of the three main Ikhwan leaders, died in 1932 after having been captured by the men of Ibn Saud.

== Background ==
At the beginning of the 20th century, Arabia was characterised by tribal wars, which eventually led to political unification under the leadership of Al Saud. The main tool behind these campaigns was the Ikhwan, the Wahhabist-Bedouin tribal army led by Sultan bin Bajad and Faisal Al Dawish. Operating from the Arabia core in Nejd, and aided by the collapse of the Ottoman Empire after the First World War, the Ikhwan had helped conquer most of the territory that later became Saudi Arabia by the end of 1925. On 10 January 1926 Abdulaziz Ibn Saud declared himself King of the Hejaz and, then, on 27 January 1927 he took the title of King of Nejd (his previous title had been 'Sultan’).

The Ikhwan were not only a tribal army, but also a religious movement rooted in Wahhabism. Many Ikhwan members regarded aspects of Bedouin custom and urban society as incompatible with Islamic practice. Their religious orientation contributed to the movement’s cohesion and military effectiveness, but it increasingly brought them into conflict with Ibn Saud as he shifted from territorial expansion toward diplomatic engagement, border control, and administrative consolidation.

Historians have interpreted the revolt as both a religious dispute and a conflict over political authority during the transition from tribal-military mobilization to centralized rule.. During the unification campaigns, the Ikhwan had operated as semi-autonomous tribal military forces loyal to Ibn Saud, while retaining considerable local influence. By the late 1920s, however, Ibn Saud increasingly sought to centralize authority and subordinate tribal forces to a more structured state apparatus.

Growing tensions also emerged over foreign policy and frontier control. Many Ikhwan leaders opposed Ibn Saud’s negotiations with British-backed governments in Iraq and Kuwait and viewed agreements establishing fixed borders as incompatible with their interpretation of Wahhabism and jihad. The Ikhwan also opposed the introduction of new technologies, including the telegraph, automobiles, and telephones, which some considered religiously objectionable innovations.

British involvement further intensified tensions. British authorities sought to prevent raids into Iraq, Transjordan, and Kuwait, and the Royal Air Force (RAF) carried out aerial operations against Ikhwan fighters following raids into British protectorates. British support for IBn Saud aligned with broader efforts to stabilise British-aligned governments in the region. These interventions reinforced Ibn Saud’s diplomatic approach while simultaneously fueling Ikhwan accusations that he had become overly accommodating toward British regional interests.

== Prelude ==
A main reason behind the eruption of the revolt was the establishment of an Iraqi police fort in Busaiya, an area used as grazing lands by the [Mutayr|Mutayri] tribe's. After Ibn Saud failed to prevent its construction through diplomatic means, Ikhwan fighters from the Mutayr tribe raided Busayya in late 1927, publicly demonstrating their dissatisfaction with Ibn Saud’s handling of the situation. The Ikhwan viewed the Iraqi government as a threat and feared that Iraqi authorities intended to control scarce desert water resources and potentially construct a railway from Baghdad to Busayya.

Mutayri tribesmen of the Ikhwan factions had also carried out raids into Kuwait, during which camels and livestock were seized. On both occasions, they looted camels and sheep. These raids provoked retaliation from Kuwaiti forces and the British Royal Air Force (RAF) and Kuwaitis. In January 1928, British RAF began launching attacks into Saudi-controlled territories, targeting tribes involved in the raids. In late February 1928, Britain paused the bombing campaign. British air power significantly limited the ability of the Ikhwan to continue cross-border warfare without provoking large-scale retaliations.

In November 1928, Ibn Saud convened a meeting in Riyadh known as Al Jam'iyah Al 'Umumiyah (the General Assembly or Riyadh Conference) in an effort to address growing tensions. The gathering included roughly 800 individuals, among them tribal leaders, members of the ulema, and prominent Ikhwan figures.

In January 1929, an Ikhwan raid on the Sheikhdom of Kuwait resulted in the killing of an American missionary, Dr. Bilkert, who was traveling by car with the philanthropist Charles Crane. With no signs of Ibn Saud mobilizing his forces to rein in the Ikhwan and stop the raids, RAF resources were extended to Kuwait. The incident further increased British pressure on Ibn Saud to restrain the Ikhwan.

== Open revolt ==
=== Battle of Sabilla ===
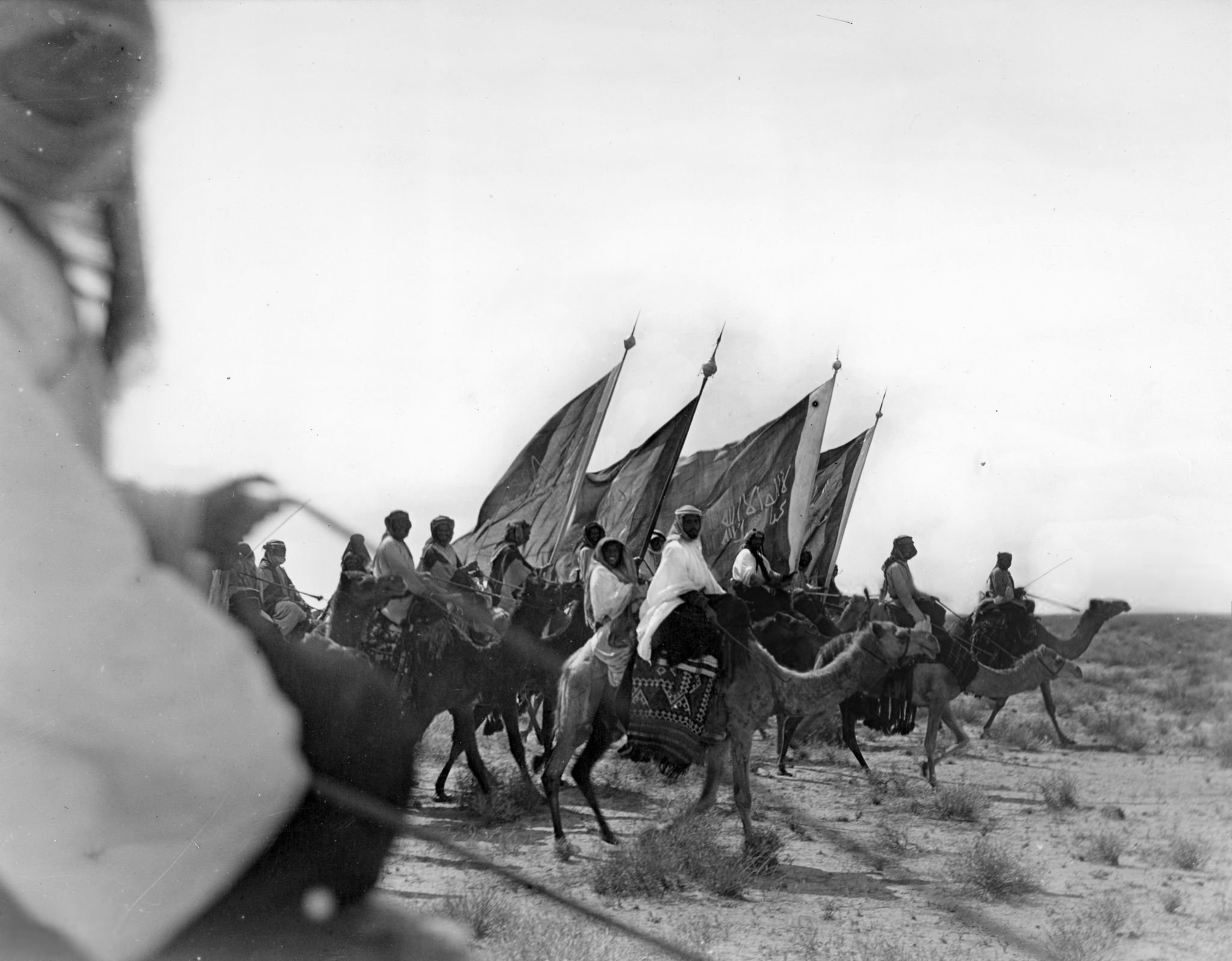
Ikhwan Army

The largest confrontation of the revolt occurred at the Battle of Sabilla in March 1929. The battle began in the early hours on 31 March 1929, and lasted approximately one hour. The battle started in the early hours on 31 March 1929. Ibn Saud’s forces, equipped with machine guns and supported by modern transportation and communications technologies, defeated the Ikhwan forces decisively.

The battle has been described as one of the last major confrontations between traditional camel-mounted tribal raiders and increasingly modernised state military forces, thus having historic importance. It had become a scene of destruction for the technologically underdeveloped Ikhwan rebels, against the cavalry and machine-guns of Ibn Saud's army. In the aftermath of the battle, approximately 500 Ikhwan rebels were killed, while Ibn Saud's forces reportedly lost around 200.

=== Battle of Jabal Shammar ===
Ikhwan-affiliated tribesmen and loyal Saudi troops clashed again in the Jabal Shammar region in August 1929, resulting in the deaths of some 1,000 men.

=== Attack on Awazim tribe ===
Despite their losses, the remaining Ikhwan rebels continued their rebellion by attacking the Awazim tribe in Arabia on 5 October 1929, resulting in the deaths of some 250 individuals.

=== Final accords ===
Faisal Al Dawish fled to Kuwait in October 1929, and government troops finally suppressed the rebellion on 10 January 1930, when Ikhwan rebel leaders surrendered to the British.

== Aftermath ==
The suppression of the Ikhwan revolt marked a turning point in Saudi state formation. The defeat of the Ikhwan removed the main internal challenge to Ibn Saud’s authority and strengthened the position of the merging centralised monarchy. The revolt demonstrated the difficulty of maintaining a semi-autonomous tribal military forces within a state increasingly defined by fixed borders, diplomatic agreements, and centralised administration.

Following the revolt, surviving Ikhwan fighters were incorporated into regular military units, while tribal raiding across international frontiers was significantly reduced. The consolidation of Ibn Saud’s authority contributed to the establishment of the Kingdom of Saudi Arabia in September 1932, when the two kingdoms of Hejaz and Nejd were united as the Kingdom of Saudi Arabia.

Some think that the effects of the defeat of Ikhwan had extended to form the seed of the conflict that erupted fifty years later in the 1979 Grand Mosque seizure. For the father of Juhayman al-Otaybi, the leader of the seizure operation, was one of the fighters who stood in the ranks of the Ikhwan against King Abdulaziz at the Battle of Sabilla in 1929, where they were decisively defeated.

== See also ==
- Grand Mosque seizure
- Adwan Rebellion
- Kura rebellion
- 1935–1936 Iraqi Shia revolts
- List of wars involving Saudi Arabia
