= Yaroslav Trofimov =

Ukrainian-Italian author and journalist

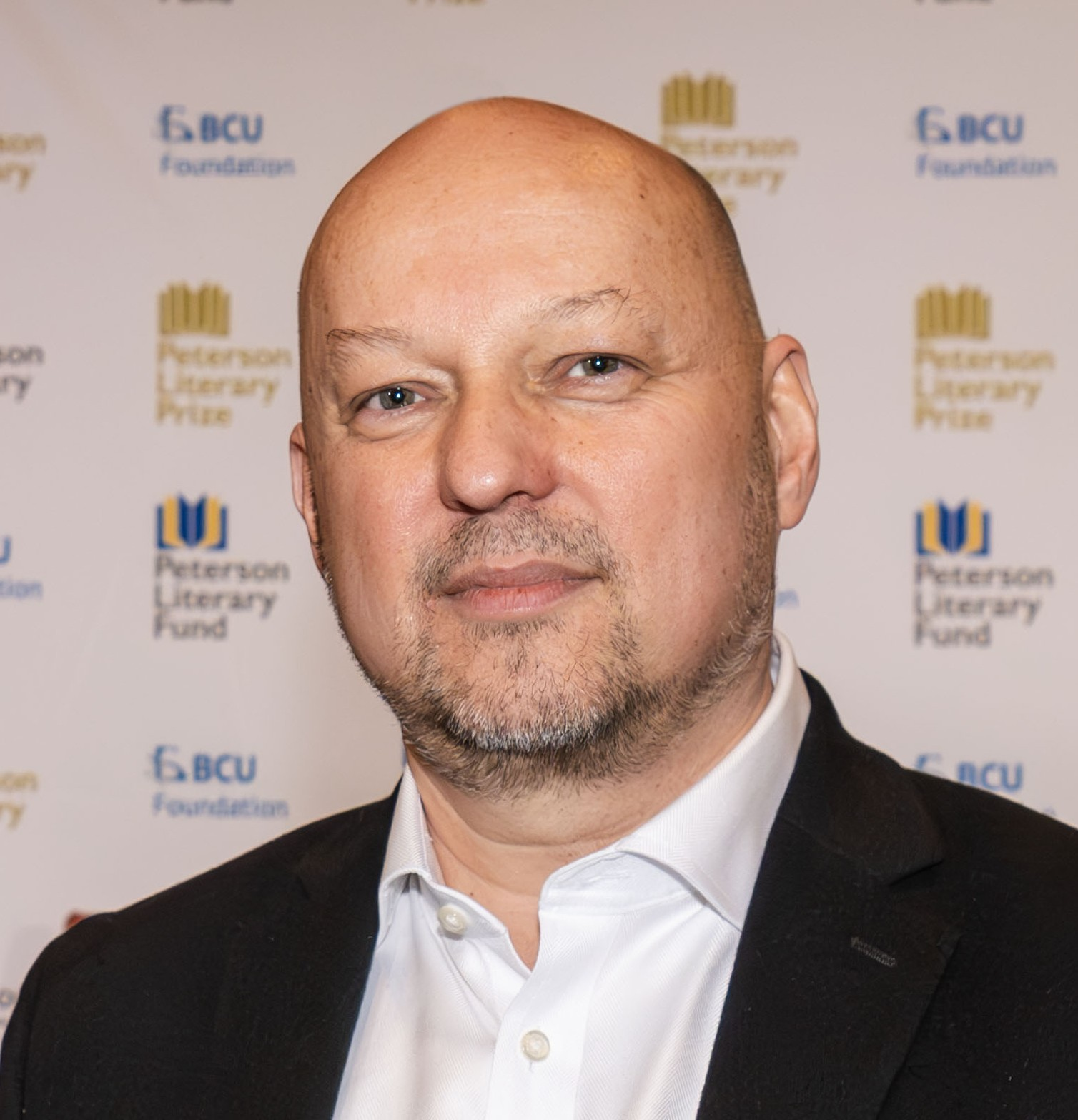
- Born: 1969 (age 56–57); Kiev, Ukrainian SSR, Soviet Union
- Occupations: Writer, journalist, and columnist
- Writing career
- Genre: Literary nonfiction
- Subject: Russo-Ukrainian War
- Website: www.yarotrof.com

Yaroslav Trofimov (born 1969) is a Ukrainian-born Italian author and journalist who is chief foreign-affairs correspondent at The Wall Street Journal. Previously he wrote a weekly column on the Greater Middle East, "Middle East Crossroads," in The Wall Street Journal. He has been a foreign correspondent for the publication since 1999, covering the Middle East, Africa, and Asia. Prior to 2015 he was The Wall Street Journal's bureau chief in Afghanistan and Pakistan.

== Awards ==
He was a finalist for the Pulitzer Prize in international reporting for two consecutive years, in 2023 for his coverage of the Russian invasion of Ukraine and in 2022 for reporting on the Taliban takeover of Afghanistan, won the Overseas Press Club Flora Lewis award in 2026, the National Press Club award for political analysis in 2024, received the Arthur Ross Media Award for his coverage of Ukraine, won the Overseas Press Club award for foreign reporting on India, won the SAJA Daniel Pearl award for the outstanding story on South Asia in 2007 and shared the SAJA award for coverage of the Mumbai bombing in 2008, among other honors. In 2021 and 2023 he was awarded the Overseas Press Club Flora Lewis award citation for best commentary on international news. His book, Our Enemies Will Vanish, was shortlisted for the 2024 Orwell Prize for Political Writing. It won the Peterson Literary Prize in December 2024.

== Books ==
- No Country for Love (Little, Brown Book Group, London, 2024; ISBN 978-0349145310). A historical novel set in Ukraine between 1930 and 1953, inspired by the author's family history.
- Our Enemies Will Vanish: The Russian Invasion and Ukraine's War of Independence (Penguin Press, New York, 2024; ISBN 978-0-593-65518-4) A non-fiction book chronicling the Russian invasion and Ukrainian resistance. The book was a finalist for the Orwell Prize in 2024.
- The Siege of Mecca: The Forgotten Uprising in Islam's Holiest Shrine and the Birth of Al Qaeda (Doubleday, New York, 2007; ISBN 978-0-385-51925-0). A historical account of the Grand Mosque Seizure in Mecca in 1979 by the precursors of Al Qaeda. The book was a finalist for the Barnes and Noble Discover Great New Writers award and won the Gold Medal of the Washington Institute Book Prize, a literary award established to highlight nonfiction books about the Middle East.
- Faith at War: A Journey on the Frontlines of Islam, from Baghdad to Timbuktu (Henry Holt, New York, 2005; ISBN 978-0-312-42511-1). A travelogue through the post-2001 Muslim world, "Faith at War" was long-listed for the Lettre Ulysses Award for literary journalism in 2006.
