= The Siege of Mecca =

2007 book by Yaroslav Trofimov

- Author: Yaroslav Trofimov
- Language: English
- Subject: Grand Mosque seizure
- Publisher: Doubleday
- Publication date: 2007
- Publication place: United States
- Media type: Print (Hardback)
- Pages: 320
- ISBN: 978-0-385-51925-0
- OCLC: 85162242
- Dewey Decimal: 953.805/3 22
- LC Class: DS248.M4 T76 2007

The Siege of Mecca: The Forgotten Uprising in Islam's Holiest Shrine and the Birth of Al Qaeda is a 2007 book by Wall Street Journal correspondent Yaroslav Trofimov about the 1979 Grand Mosque seizure in Mecca.

Hundreds of Islamic radicals led by Saudi preacher Juhayman al-Otaybi invaded the Masjid al-Haram in Mecca, Islam's holiest shrine, on November 20, 1979. The intruders included men from all over the Muslim world and a handful of American converts. Tens of thousands of worshipers were trapped inside the compound. The battle for the shrine lasted two weeks, causing hundreds of deaths and ending only after the intervention of Saudi National Guard and French special forces.

Yaroslav Trofimov's book provides the first detailed account of this siege. The book is based on interviews with surviving participants and eyewitnesses, including former terrorist supporters of Juhayman al-Otaybi, as well as hundreds of declassified U.S., British and French government documents.
