= Eqab bin Mohaya =

Saudi Arabian Ikhwan leader

Eqab Bin Mohaya
- Born: 1903; Sajir Dawadmi
- Died: 1933 (age 29–30); Sajir Dawadmi
- Burial place: Sajir Dawadmi
- Military career
- Allegiance: Ikhwan
- Service years: 1922–1933
- Conflicts: Unification of Saudi Arabia; Ikhwan raids on Transjordan; Saudi conquest of Hejaz; Battle of Jeddah (1925); Ikhwan revolt; Capture of Mecca (1924)

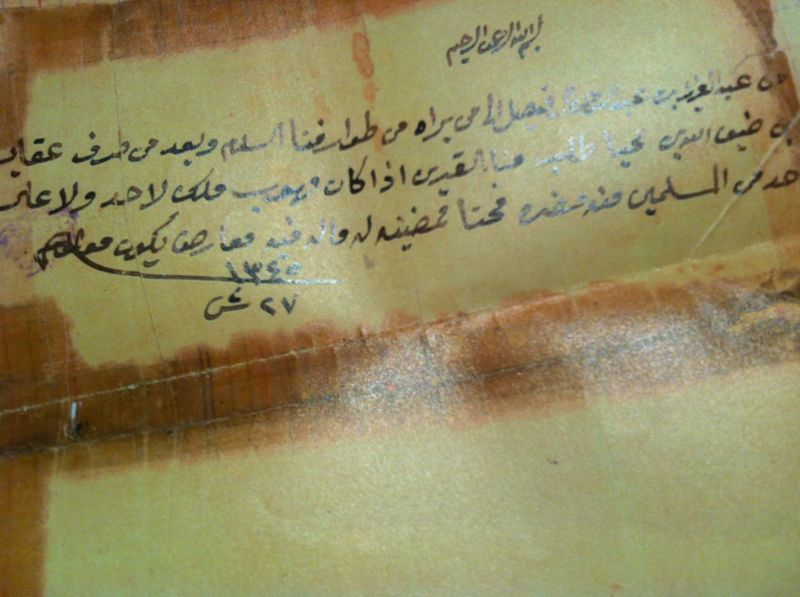
King Ibn Saud signature in a document to Eqab bin Muhaya

Eqab Bin Dhaifallah Bin Ghazi Bin Sayaf Bin Mohaya Al-Otaibi (Arabic: عـقـاب بن ضيف الله بن غازي بن سياف بن محـيا (1903–1933) was one of the Ikhwan Army's leaders that contributed in the unification of the Kingdom of Saudi Arabia.

== Biography ==
He was born in the desert in a place called “Aliyat Najd”. His grandfather from the mother side was Prince Muhammad Bin Hadi Al-Barraq. Eqab did not see his father because he was too young and his father, Prince Dhaifallah Bin Ghazi Bin Mohaya (AL-Akwakh), was killed in a battle against Abdulaziz Al Rasheed nearby Bin Fuhaid water source in Alqseem region in the beginning of 1323H. He was 13 years of age when his family settled in the city of Sajer. He learned the holy Qur'an by heart and studied the Fiqh (Islamic Sharia doctrine) that was taught by a number of scholars who were tasked by King Abdulaziz to teach the residents of Sajer, in which had produced scholars such as Shaikh Abdurrahman Bin Abdullatief Al Al Shaikh and Shaikh Abdullah Al Ojaimi. He also learned horse riding at an early age in an environment that was rich of horse riders or cavalries. These factors had influenced the shaping of his personality and character in which raised him as a leader at an early age. He was famous of being brave, generous and very kind. He was very religious, a keeper of God's book, liked by his tribe and he cared for the poor and weak people. He was infatuated with horses and owned many of them at his stall such as (AL-Obayah) and (AL-Subailiyah) which are from a rare type of Arabian horses, and nowadays few of that type can be found.

Eqab was inseparable to his cousin and to his father's uncle, Prince Faihan bin Nasser bin Braz bin Mohaya, and participated with him in a number of battles that he fought in Bayraq Sajer, and the most famous battle was Ya Teb (the first trial to open the city of Hail). After the death of Prince Faihan bin Nasser, he appointed to be the prince although he was young. Being directed by King Abdulaziz, he handled the most important battles in the establishment of the Kingdom of Saudi Arabia (the battle of Al Balga’a, east of Jordan) and (the battle of Hijaz). After the victory of Hijaz and the ending of the unification battles, he exited Sajer at the end of 1344H. After that, he gained from King Abdulaziz the feudality of the southern of Al Hied and he settled there. At the year of 1348H, King Abduaziz assigned him as the governor of Al Hied. Following that, Eqab had led his troops to side up with King Abdul-Aziz to suppress the revolution of the rebellion brothers. He remained the governor of Al Hied until he died in 1351H.

Eqab Bin Mohaya was one of the Ikhwan movement leaders who participated in the unification of this great entity, The Kingdom of Saudi Arabia. His role arose especially during his leadership of Sajer brigade, and the number who answered the call for jihad reached 2,000 fighters. Here are the battles he participated in:

- First: Al Balqa’a battle, east of the first Jordan (the year of cultivation) 192, a Governor (Prince) of Sajer and a leader of invasion.
- Second: The opening of Hejaz in 1343H, the Governor (Prince) of Sajer, Sajer brigade commander and one of the chiefs for the advance groups:

a. Occupying the city of Taif b. The opening of Makkah c. The joining of Al Qunfudhah d. The siege of Al Raghama Jeddah

- Third: The suppression of the rebellion brothers after the battle of Al Sabla, and the Governor (Prince) of Al Hied

== The raids ==
When King Abdul-Aziz wanted to ensure his control over the north of the Arabian Peninsula and to cut off the ambition of the English and Sharif Abdullah bin Al Husain to control the Oasis of Al Joaf and Wadi Al Sarhan, he sent an army that was estimated by historical resources to be 1500 fighters combining four banners headed by :

1) Eqab Bin Mohaya, leading 600 fighters from Sajer in addition to the reserves and cavalries.

2) Nafel Bin Tuwaique, leading 200 fighters from Asilah.

3) Qadan Bin Derwiesh, leading 200 fighters from AL-Artawi.

4) Huwail Bin Jebreen, leading 150 fighters from AL-Amar.

On Tuesday 15 August 1922, the brothers had reached the territories of Bani Sakher in AL-Tunaib and AL-Mashta, about 30 km from Amman the capital after traveling for more than 700 km from their bases in Najd. By morning, reinforcements from different marquees of Bani Sakher had rushed to restrain the invaders. Volunteers from the bedouins in Jordan had initiated the movement to the battle area, and the troupes had engaged in a very aggressive battle. One side were defending their marquees and herds, and the others were attacking based on religion. So the Jordanian government had quickly asked the British authorities to participate in the battle with fighter aircraft and military tanks. The Brits had felt the risk and feared that the Saudi influence would reach the British direct liaison passage which was in Kuwait and Iraq from one side and Jordan, Palestine and AL-Hijaz from another side, so the Brits had engaged to stop the attack by using tanks and automatic weapons, and the fight against the brothers army continued all day Tuesday until midmorning on Wednesday. A large number from both sides were killed, and because of the British tanks missiles, the brothers army had no choice but to retreat to Najd, especially that the brothers had accomplished the desired objective in which was gaining the control over AL-Jouf and Wadi AL-Sarhan. After the retreat of the brothers’ army, the Brits had initiated and requested King Abdul-Aziz to hold a meeting. So the second AL-Oqair meeting was held in November 1922 discussing the borders issue for the first time, and both agreed under the condition of giving the tribes the freedom of movement and in retain the Brits had acknowledged King Abdul-Aziz's control over AL-Jouf and wadi AL-Sarhan.

== Occupying Alhejaz ==
Sharief Husain had forbid the people of Najd to come to Hadj. This was largely and negatively affecting their hearts especially for the brothers group. Therefore, King Abdul-Aziz at the end of 1342H headed a conference in Riyadh attended by Najd's Islamic scholars, heads of the tribes and leaders of the brothers, and King Abdul-Aziz had gained a legal fatwa to carry on a war against AL-Sharief to ensure the freedom of performing hadj. So a decision to invade AL-Hijaz was issued by the conference held in Riyadh and the brothers’ leaders and gathered the armies in Truba and from there they headed for Taif. At that time, Prince Eqab headed the Sajer brigade and fought the following battles: 1. Occupying the city of Taif. 2. The opening of Makkah. 3. Subjoining AL-qunfthah. 4. Conducting a siege on AL-Raghama.

== Occupying the city of Taif ==
AL-Hashimy organized army had left the city of Taif to stop the brothers’ armies, and a fierce battle went on in AL-Hawiya where the brothers’ armies did very well and the battle ended by the retreatment of AL-Hashimies and taking shelter in the hills of Taif and firing their artilleries while they were in a king of a siege. Two days later, Prince Ali, the oldest son of AL-Husain, had arrived to rescue the city of Makkah. He camped in AL-Hudda west of Taif about a mile to the north. The remains of the organized army, groups of the Taif high officials and their supporters had rushed into him, and after some scrimmages between the brothers and the army of Prince Ali, the brothers had assaulted the city of Taif on the 7th day of the month of Safar. Rescues had followed for Prince Ali from Makkah and its surroundings, soldiers and tribes, so the decisive battle had taken place on the night of 26/27 of Safar. The brothers had occupied the camp of Prince Ali in AL-Hudda, and the Hashimies and their followers had dispersed and that's when the advance stopped in Taif and AL-Hada. The brothers had sent a request to King Abdul Aziz for a permission to continue the approach to Makkah. During this time, Ali had returned to his father in Makkah discussing the options, then Ali went to Jeddah and the top officials in Jeddah had sent to King Husain on the 4th of Rabi’e AL-Awal in 1343H asking him to step-down from the throne of AL-Hijaz for his son Ali. After long discussion, AL-Husain had pronounced his stepping down from the throne on the night of that day. On the morning of the 5th of Rabi’e AL-Awal, Prince Ali was announced in Jeddah to be the King of AL-Hijaz.

== Occupying Makkah and Jeddah ==
On 17 of Rabi’e AL-Awal, the brothers had entered Makkah with their weapons going to perform Omrah. On the 8th of Jamad AL-Awal, King Abdul Aziz had arrived in Makkah coming from Riyadh. He entered Makkah for Omrah and the people of Makkah came to him and paid homage to him. The soldiers of the brothers and King Abdul Aziz had advanced and sieged Jeddah. On the 6th of Jamad AL-Thani 1344H, Jeddah had surrendered after a long siege that went on for a year.

== The fatwas of the Islamic scholars ==
The Riyadh's Islamic scholars had issued a fatwa prohibiting entry to the Haram (site) (mosque) with the intention of fighting. King Abdul-Aziz had permitted the siege of the city of Makkah if there was any resistance, so the brothers had entered Makkah with the Omrah clothes on without any resistance and calling peace and safety. Then they had performed omrah. After that they had received control and claimed victory over AL-Sharief on the 17th of Rabie’e AL-Awal 1343H (1924). • This way the heroes and their followers had controlled AL-Hijaz and attached it to the great entity, the Kingdom of Saudi Arabia. • In 1351H he died in AL-Hied in the same year at the age of thirty, spending most of his life as a mujahed, a leader of the Sajer brigade and then AL-Hied under the flag of the unifier of this entity until 1351H when it was pronounced as the Kingdom of Saudi Arabia.

== See also ==
- 'Utaybah
- history of Jordan
- ikhwan raids on Transjordan
