= Al Hafirah, Ha'il =

Al Hafirah
- Village
- Location in Saudi Arabia
- Coordinates: 26°52′32.73″N 40°17′35.66″E
- Country: Saudi Arabia
- Province: Ha'il Province
- Time zone: UTC+3 (EAT)
  - Summer (DST): UTC+3 (EAT)

Al Hafirah is a small desert village in Ha'il Province, in northern-central Saudi Arabia.
