= Grand Mosque seizure =

1979 radical Islamic insurgency in Mecca, Saudi Arabia

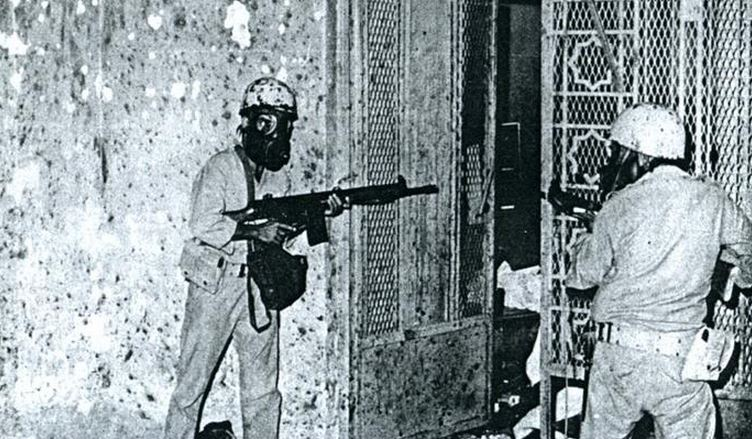
- Saudi soldiers pushing into the underground corridor of the Grand Mosque of Mecca after gassing the interior with a non-lethal chemical agent provided by French specialists.
Date	20 November – 4 December 1979 (15 days)
Location	Mecca, Saudi Arabia 21°25′19″N 39°49′33″E
Result	Saudi victory: Saudi military regains control of Masjid al-Haram after two weeks of fighting; Execution of Juhayman al-Otaybi and his followers by way of public decapitation

Belligerents
Saudi Arabia; Supported by: France	Ikhwan (self-proclaimed)

Commanders and leaders
King Khalid; Fahd of Saudi Arabia; Sultan bin Abdulaziz; Abdullah bin Abdulaziz; Nayef bin Abdulaziz; Badr bin Abdulaziz; Turki bin Faisal; Faleh al-Dhaheri; A. Qudheibi (WIA); M. Zuweid al-Nefai †	Juhayman al-Otaybi (executed); Muhammad al-Qahtani †; Muhammad Faisal (surrendered); Muhammad Elias (surrendered)

Units involved
GDPS special forces; National Guard; Special Security Forces; GIP; GIGN (advisors)	N/A

Strength
c. 10,000 troops	300–600 militants

Casualties and losses
127 killed; 451 wounded	117 killed; 68 executed
- 26 pilgrims killed; Over 100 pilgrims injured
- Location within Saudi Arabia

The Grand Mosque seizure took place between 20 November and 4 December 1979 at the Grand Mosque of Mecca in Mecca, Saudi Arabia, the holiest site in Islam. The attack was carried out by up to 600 militants led by Juhayman al-Otaybi, a Saudi Islamist opposed to the monarchy, belonging to the Otaibah tribe. The insurgents identified themselves as "al-Ikhwan" (Arabic: الإخوان), referencing the Arabian militia that had played a role in the early formation of the Saudi state in the early 20th century. Scholars refer to them as Juhayman's Ikhwan.

The insurgents took hostages from among the worshippers and called for an uprising against the House of Saud, decrying their pursuit of alliances with "Christian infidels" from the Western world, and stating that the Saudi government's policies were betraying Islam by attempting to push secularism into Saudi society. They also declared that the Mahdi (a harbinger of the end of times) had arrived in the form of one of the militants' leaders, Muhammad Abdullah al-Qahtani.

Seeking assistance for their counteroffensive against the Ikhwan, the Saudis requested urgent aid from France, which responded by dispatching advisory units from the GIGN. After French operatives provided them with a special type of tear gas that dulls aggression and obstructs breathing, Saudi troops gassed the interior of the Grand Mosque and forced entry. They successfully secured the site after two weeks of fighting. A total of 270 died during the siege and another 68 were subsequently executed.

In the process of retaking the Grand Mosque, the Saudi forces killed al-Qahtani, the self-proclaimed messiah. Juhayman and 68 other militants were captured alive and later sentenced to death by Saudi authorities, being executed by beheading in public displays across a number of Saudi cities. The Ikhwan's siege of the Grand Mosque, which had occurred amidst the Islamic Revolution in nearby Iran, prompted further unrest across the Muslim world. Large-scale anti-American riots broke out in many Muslim-majority countries after Iranian religious cleric Ruhollah Khomeini claimed in a radio broadcast that the Grand Mosque seizure had been orchestrated by the United States and Israel.

Following the attack, Saudi king Khalid bin Abdulaziz enforced a stricter system of Islamic law throughout the country and gave the ulama more power over the next decade. Likewise, Saudi Arabia's Islamic religious police became more assertive.

== Background ==
The seizure was led by Juhayman al-Otaybi, a member of the Otaibah family, influential in Najd. He declared his brother-in-law Mohammed Abdullah al-Qahtani to be the Mahdi, or redeemer, who is believed to arrive on earth several years before Judgment Day. His followers embellished the fact that Al-Qahtani's name and his father's name are identical to the Prophet Muhammad's name and that of his father, and developed a saying, "His and his father's names were the same as Mohammed's and his father's, and he had come to Makkah from the north", to justify their belief.

The date of the attack, 20 November 1979, was the first day of the year 1400 according to the Islamic calendar. This ties in with the tradition of the mujaddid, a person who appears at the turn of every century of the Islamic calendar to revive Islam, cleansing it of extraneous elements and restoring it to its pristine purity.

Juhayman's grandfather, Sultan bin Bajad al-Otaybi, had ridden with Ibn Saud in the early decades of the century, and other Otaibah family members were among the foremost of the Ikhwan. Juhayman acted as a preacher, a corporal in the Saudi National Guard, and was a former student of Sheikh Abd al-Aziz Ibn Baz, who went on to become the Grand Mufti of Saudi Arabia.

=== Goals ===
Al-Otaybi had turned against Ibn Baz "and began advocating a return to the original ways of Islam, among other things: a repudiation of the West; abolition of television and expulsion of non-Muslims." Criticizing the House of Saud in his preaching since the mid-1970s, Al-Otaybi accused them of "worship[ping] money and spend[ing] it on palaces, not mosques".

Al-Otaybi and Qahtani had met while imprisoned together for sedition, when al-Otaybi claimed to have had a vision sent by God telling him that Qahtani was the Mahdi. Their declared goal was to institute a theocracy in preparation for the imminent apocalypse. They differed from the original Ikhwan and other earlier Wahhabi purists in that "they were millenarians, they rejected the monarchy and condemned the Wahhabi ulama".

=== Relations with ulama ===
Many of their followers were from theology students at the Islamic University in Medina. Al-Otaybi joined the local chapter of the Salafi group Al-Jamaa Al-Salafiya Al-Muhtasiba (JSM, "The Salafi Group That Commands Right and Forbids Wrong") in Medina headed by Sheikh Abd al-Aziz Ibn Baz, chairman of the Permanent Committee for Islamic Research and Issuing Fatwas at the time. The followers preached their radical message in different mosques in Saudi Arabia without being arrested, and the government was reluctant to confront religious extremists.

In 1978, Al-Otaybi, al-Qahtani and a number of the Ikhwan were locked up as troublemakers by the Ministry of Interior security police, the Mabahith. Members of the ulama, including Ibn Baz, cross-examined them for heresy, but they were released as being traditionalists harkening back to the original Ikhwan, like al-Otaybi's grandfather and, therefore, not a threat.

Even after the seizure of the Grand Mosque, a certain level of forbearance by ulama for the rebels remained. When the government asked for a fatwa allowing armed force in the Grand Mosque, the language of Ibn Baz and other senior ulama "was curiously restrained". The scholars did not declare al-Otaybi and his followers non-Muslims, despite their violation of the sanctity of the Grand Mosque, but only termed them "al-jamaah al-musallahah" (the armed group). The senior scholars also insisted that before security forces attack them, the authorities must offer them the option to surrender.

=== Preparations ===
Because of donations from wealthy followers, the group was well-armed and trained. Some members, like al-Otaybi, were former military officials of the National Guard. Some National Guard troops sympathetic to the insurgents smuggled weapons, ammunition, gas masks and provisions into the mosque compound over a period of weeks before the new year. Automatic weapons were smuggled from National Guard armories. The supplies were hidden in the hundreds of small underground rooms under the mosque that were used as hermitages.

During the preparations to retake the Grand Mosque, Saudi forces received assistance from foreign military advisors. Pakistani military trainers, who had been involved in training Saudi security forces prior to the crisis, were among those who contributed to counterterrorism training. While the primary planning and execution of the operation were handled by the Saudi National Guard, foreign expertise, including from Pakistani advisors, played a role in preparing the Saudi forces for the siege.

== Seizure ==
In the early morning of 20 November 1979, the imam of the Grand Mosque, Sheikh Mohammed al-Subayil, was preparing to lead prayers for the 50,000 worshippers who had gathered for prayer. At around 5:00 am he was interrupted by insurgents who produced weapons from under their robes, chained the gates shut and killed two policemen, who were armed with only wooden clubs for disciplining unruly pilgrims. The number of insurgents has been given as "at least 500" or "four to five hundred", and included several women and children who had joined al-Otaybi's movement.

At the time, the Grand Mosque was being renovated by the Saudi Binladin Group. An employee of the organization was able to report the seizure to the outside world before the insurgents cut the telephone lines.

The insurgents released most of the hostages and locked the remainder in the sanctuary. They took defensive positions in the upper levels of the mosque, and sniper positions in the minarets, from which they commanded the grounds. No one outside the mosque knew how many hostages remained, how many militants were in the mosque and what sort of preparations they had made.

At the time of the event, Crown Prince Fahd was in Tunisia for a meeting of the Arab League Summit. The commander of the National Guard, Prince Abdullah, was also abroad for an official visit to Morocco. Therefore, King Khalid assigned the responsibility to two members of the Sudairi Seven – Prince Sultan, then Minister of Defence, and Prince Nayef, then Minister of Interior, to deal with the incident.

== Siege ==
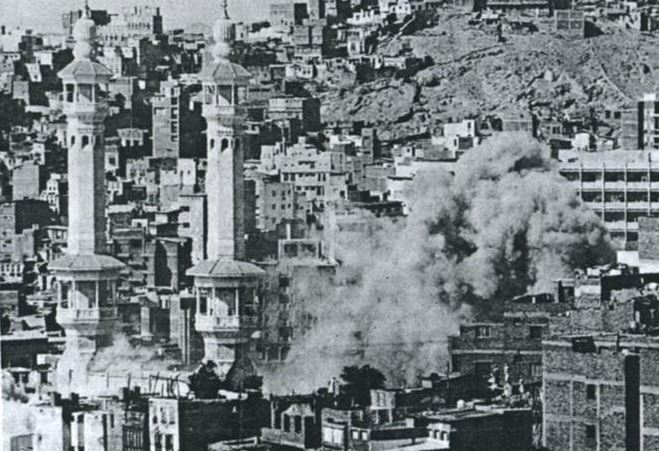
Smoke rising from the Grand Mosque during the assault on the Marwa-Safa gallery, 1979.

Soon after the rebel seizure, about 100 security officers of the Ministry of Interior attempted to retake the mosque, but were turned back with heavy casualties. The survivors were quickly joined by units of the Saudi Arabian Army and Saudi Arabian National Guard. At the request of the Saudi monarchy, French GIGN units, operatives and commandos along with Pakistani Special Service Group were rushed to assist Saudi forces in Mecca.

By evening, a security cordon had been established around the Grand Mosque. Prince Sultan appointed Turki bin Faisal Al Saud, head of the Al Mukhabaraat Al 'Aammah (Saudi Intelligence), to take over the forward command post several hundred meters from the mosque, where Prince Turki would remain for the next several weeks. However, the first task was to seek the approval of the ulama, which was led by Abdul Aziz Ibn Baz. Islam forbids any violence within the Grand Mosque, to the extent that plants cannot be uprooted without explicit religious sanction. Ibn Baz found himself in a delicate situation, especially as he had previously taught al-Otaybi in Medina. Regardless, the ulama issued a fatwa allowing deadly force to be used in retaking the mosque.

With religious approval granted, Saudi forces launched frontal assaults on three of the main gates. Again, the assaulting forces were repulsed. Snipers continued to pick off soldiers who revealed themselves. The insurgents aired their demands from the mosque's loudspeakers throughout the streets of Mecca, calling for the cut-off of oil exports to the United States and the expulsion of all foreign civilian and military experts from the Arabian Peninsula. In Beirut, an opposition organization, the Arab Socialist Action Party – Arabian Peninsula, issued a statement on 25 November, alleging to clarify the demands of the insurgents. The party, however, denied any involvement in the seizure of the Grand Mosque.

Officially, the Saudi government took the position that it would not aggressively retake the mosque, but rather starve out the militants. Nevertheless, several unsuccessful assaults were undertaken, at least one of them through the underground tunnels in and around the mosque.

According to Lawrence Wright in the book The Looming Tower: Al-Qaeda and the Road to 9/11:

A team of three French commandos from the Groupe d'Intervention de la Gendarmerie Nationale (GIGN) arrived in Mecca. Because of the prohibition against non-Muslims entering the holy city, they converted to Islam in a brief, formal ceremony. The commandos pumped gas into the underground chambers, but perhaps because the rooms were so bafflingly interconnected, the gas failed and the resistance continued. With casualties climbing, Saudi forces drilled holes into the courtyard and dropped grenades into the rooms below, indiscriminately killing many hostages but driving the remaining rebels into more open areas where they could be picked off by sharpshooters. More than two weeks after the assault began, the surviving rebels finally surrendered.

However, this account is contradicted by at least two other accounts, including that of then GIGN commanding officer Christian Prouteau: the three GIGN commandos trained and equipped the Saudi forces and devised their attack plan (which consisted of drilling holes in the floor of the Mosque and firing gas canisters wired with explosives through the perforations), but did not take part in the action and did not set foot in the Mosque.

The Saudi National Guard and the Saudi Army suffered heavy casualties. Tear gas was used to force out the remaining militants. According to a US embassy cable made on 1 December, several of the militant leaders escaped the siege and days later sporadic fighting erupted in other parts of the city.

The battle had lasted for more than two weeks, and had officially left "255 pilgrims, troops and fanatics" killed and "another 560 injured ... although diplomats suggested the toll was higher." Military casualties were 127 dead and 451 injured.

== Aftermath ==
=== Misinformation and violence ===
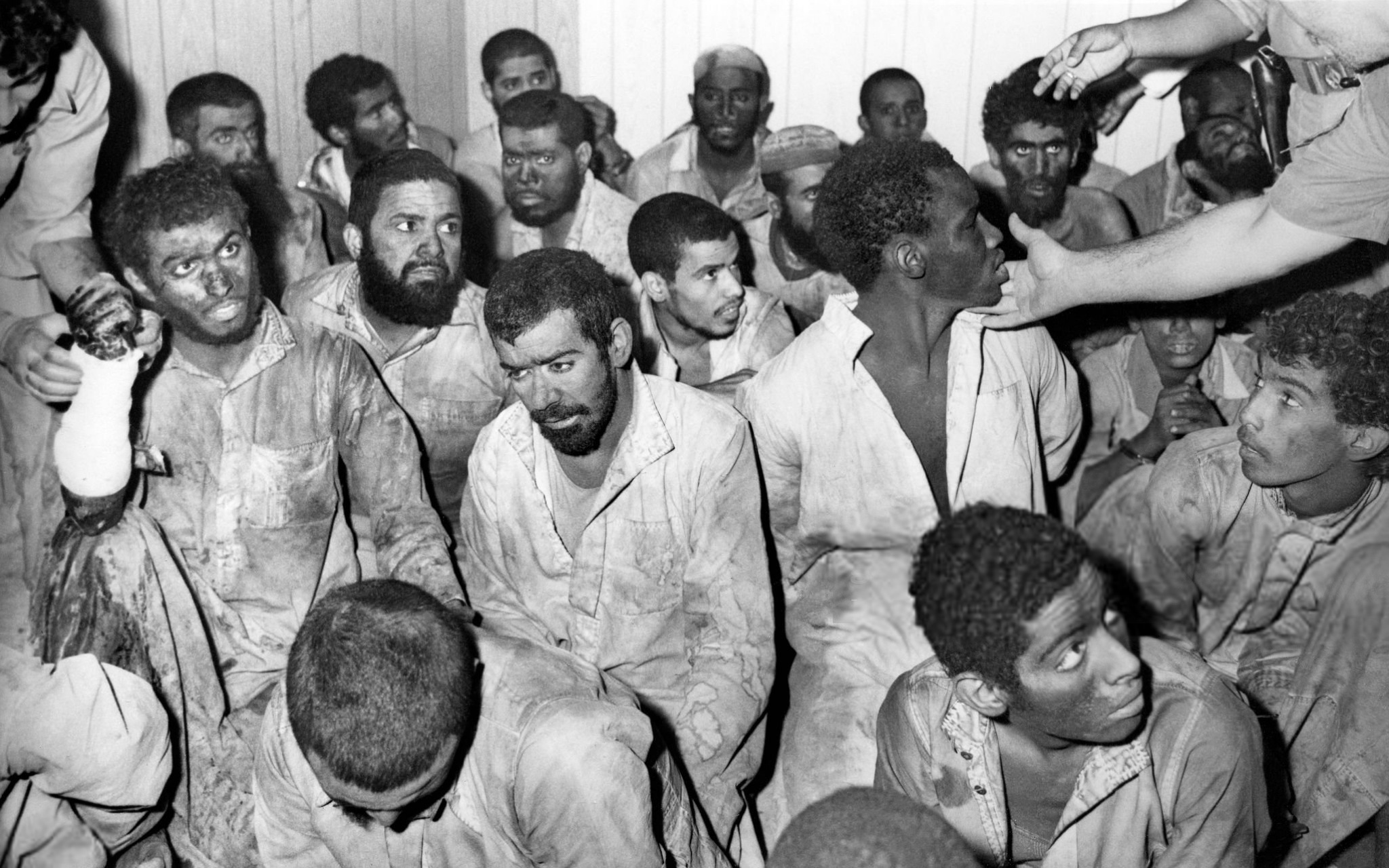
Surviving insurgents in custody of Saudi authorities, 1979.

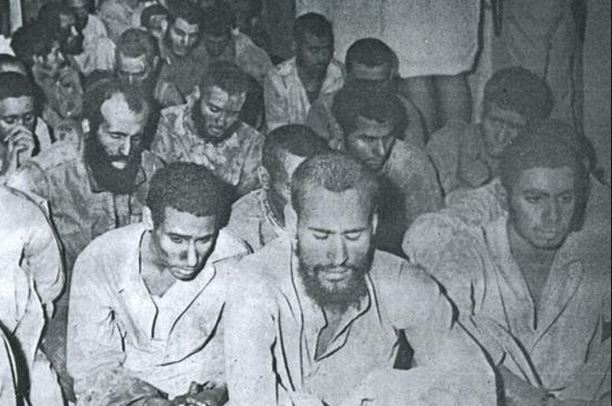
Surviving insurgents in custody of Saudi authorities, 1979.

Shortly after news of the takeover was released, the new Islamic leader of Iran, Ayatollah Khomeini, told radio listeners, "It is not beyond guessing that this is the work of criminal American imperialism and international Zionism." Anger fuelled by these rumours spread anti-American demonstrations throughout the Muslim world, noted occurring in the Philippines, Turkey, Bangladesh, eastern Saudi Arabia, the United Arab Emirates and Pakistan.

In Islamabad, Pakistan, on the day following the takeover, the U.S. embassy was overrun by a mob, which burned the embassy to the ground. A week later, in Tripoli, Libya, another mob attacked and burned the U.S. embassy. Soviet agents also spread rumours that the U.S. was behind the Grand Mosque seizure.

=== Trials and policy changes ===
Al-Qahtani was killed in the recapture of the mosque. Juhayman and 67 other insurgents who survived the assault were captured and later beheaded. They were not shown any leniency. The king secured a fatwa (edict) from the Council of Senior Scholars which found the defendants guilty of seven crimes:

- violating the Masjid al-Haram's (the Grand Mosque's) sanctity
- violating the sanctity of the month of Muharram
- killing fellow Muslims and others
- disobeying legitimate authorities
- suspending prayer at Masjid al-Haram
- erring in identifying the Mahdi
- exploiting the innocent for criminal acts

On 9 January 1980, 63 rebels were publicly beheaded in the squares of eight Saudi cities (Buraidah, Dammam, Mecca, Medina, Riyadh, Abha, Ha'il and Tabuk). According to Sandra Mackey, the locations "were carefully chosen not only to give maximum exposure but, one suspects, to reach other potential nests of discontent."

King Khalid did not react to the upheaval by cracking down on religious puritans in general, but by giving the ulama and religious conservatives more power over the next decade. Initially, photographs of women in newspapers were banned, then women on television. Cinemas and music shops were shut down. School curriculum was changed to provide many more hours of religious studies, eliminating classes on subjects like non-Islamic history. Gender segregation was extended "to the humblest coffee shop", and religious police became more powerful, with a series of royal decrees. Not until decades after the uprising would the Saudi government again begin making incremental reforms towards a more liberal society.

== See also ==
- Ikhwan revolt
- List of Mahdi claimants
- List of modern conflicts in the Middle East
- List of wars involving Saudi Arabia
- Operation Blue Star
- Sack of Mecca
- Siege of Lal Masjid
