= Willert =

Willert is a German language surname derived from a given name composed of the elements wil "will, desire" and hard "hardy, brave, strong". Notable people with the name include:

- Arthur Willert (1882–1973), British journalist and public servant
- Benedikt Willert (2001), German professional footballer
- Eveline Willert Cunnington (1849–1916), British-born social reformer, feminist, lecturer and writer
- Paul Willert (1901–1988), German musicologist and baritone singer
- Paul Ferdinand Willert (1844–1912), English author
- Thomas Willert Beale (1828–1894), English miscellaneous writer

== See also ==
- Willard (name)
