= Heroes of the Nations series =

Biography of famous people in history

The Heroes of the Nations series was a collection of biographies of famous people who influenced nations and changed the course of history. The series was published in New York and London from 1890 by G. P. Putnam's Sons. The founding editor was Evelyn Abbott. Each biography was printed in one crown octavo volume in large type with maps and illustrations accompanying them.

== Titles in series ==
- No. 1: W. Clark Russell - Horatio Nelson and the Naval Supremacy of England (1890) - Admiral Lord Nelson
- No. 2: C. R. L. Fletcher - Gustavus Adolphus and the Struggle of Protestantism for Existence (1890) - Gustavus Adolphus
- No. 3: Evelyn Abbott - Pericles and the Golden Age of Athens (1891) - Pericles
- No. 4: Thomas Hodgkin - Theodoric the Goth; the Barbarian Champion of Civilisation (1891) - Theodoric the Great
- No. 5: H. R. Fox Bourne - Sir Philip Sidney: Type of English Chivalry in the Elizabethan Age (1891) - Sir Philip Sidney
- No. 6: W. Warde Fowler - Julius Caesar and the Foundation of the Roman Imperial System (1892) - Julius Caesar
- No. 7: Lewis Sergeant - John Wyclif: Last of the Schoolmen and First of the English Reformers (1893) - John Wycliffe
- No. 8: William O'Connor Morris - Napoleon; Warrior and Ruler, and the Military Supremacy of Revolutionary France (1893) - Napoleon Bonaparte
- No. 9: Paul Ferdinand Willert - Henry of Navarre and the Huguenots in France (1893) - Henry IV of France
- No. 10: J. L. Strachan-Davidson - Cicero and the Fall of the Roman Republic (1894) - Cicero
- No. 11: Noah Brooks - Abraham Lincoln and the Downfall of American Slavery (1894) - Abraham Lincoln
- No. 12: C. Raymond Beazley - Prince Henry the Navigator; The Hero of Portugal and of Modern Discovery (1895) - Henry the Navigator
- No. 13: Alice Gardner - Julian; Philosopher and Emperor, and the Last Struggle of Paganism against Christianity (1895) - Emperor Julian
- No. 14: Arthur Hassall - Louis XIV and the Zenith of the French Monarchy (1895) - Louis XIV
- No. 15: R. Nisbet Bain - Charles XII and the Collapse of the Swedish Empire (1895) - Charles XII of Sweden
- No. 16: Edward Armstrong - Lorenzo de'Medici and Florence in the Fifteenth Century (1896) - Lorenzo de Medici
- No. 17: Mrs. Oliphant - Jeanne D'Arc: Her Life and Death (1896) - Joan of Arc
- No. 18: Washington Irving - Columbus: His Life and Voyages (condensed edition, 1905?) - Christopher Columbus
- No. 19: Herbert Maxwell - Robert the Bruce and the Struggle for Scottish Independence (1897) - Robert the Bruce
- No. 20: William O'Connor Morris - Hannibal: Soldier, Statesman, Patriot (1897) - Hannibal
- No. 21: William Conant Church - Ulysses S. Grant and the Period of National Preservation and Reconstruction (1897) - Ulysses S. Grant
- No. 22: Henry Alexander White - Robert E. Lee and the Southern Confederacy, 1807-1870 (1897) - General Lee
- No. 23: Henry Butler Clarke - The Cid Campeador and the Waning of the Crescent in the West (1897) - El Cid
- No. 24: Stanley Lane-Poole - Saladin and the Fall of Jerusalem (1898) - Saladin
- No. 25: James Wycliffe Headlam - Bismarck and the Foundation of the German Empire (1899) - Otto von Bismarck
- No. 26: Benjamin Ide Wheeler - Alexander the Great: the Merging of East and West in Universal History (1900) - Alexander the Great
- No. 27: H. W. Carless Davis - Charlemagne (Charles the Great); the Hero of Two Nations (1900) - Charlemagne
- No. 28: C. H. Firth - Oliver Cromwell and the Rule of the Puritans in England (1900) - Oliver Cromwell
- No. 29: James Breck Perkins - Richelieu and the Growth of French Power (1900) - Cardinal Richelieu
- No. 30: Robert Dunlop - Daniel O'Connell and the Revival of National Life in Ireland (1900) - Daniel O'Connell
- No. 31: Frederick Perry - Saint Louis (Louis IX of France): The Most Christian King (1901) - Louis IX of France
- No. 32: Walford Davis Green - William Pitt Earl of Chatham and the Growth and Division of the British Empire 1708-1778 (1901) - Pitt the Elder
- No. 33: Arthur Granville Bradley - Owen Glyndwr and the Last Struggle for Welsh Independence (1901) - Owain Glyndwr
- No. 34: Charles Lethbridge Kingsford - Henry V: the Typical Mediaeval Hero (1901) - Henry V of England
- No. 35: Edward Jenks - Edward Plantagenet (Edward I). The English Justinian or the Making of the Common Law (1902) - Edward I of England
- No. 36: John B. Firth - Augustus Caesar and the Organisation of the Empire of Rome (1903) - Emperor Augustus
- No. 37: William Fiddian Reddaway - Frederick the Great and the Rise of Prussia (1904) - Frederick the Great
- No. 38: William O'Connor Morris - Wellington, Soldier and Statesman and the Revival of Military Power in England (1904) - The Duke of Wellington
- No. 39: John B. Firth - Constantine the Great; the Reorganisation of the Empire and the Triumph of the Church (1905) - Emperor Constantine
- No. 40: D. S. Margoliouth - Mohammed and the Rise of Islam (1905) - Muhammad
- No. 41: Ruth Putnam - Charles the Bold: Last Duke of Burgundy 1433-1477 (1908) - Charles the Bold
- No. 42: James Albert Harrison - George Washington, Patriot, Soldier, Statesman, First President of the United States (1906) - George Washington
- No. 43: F. M. Stenton - William the Conqueror and the Rule of the Normans (1908) - William the Conqueror
- No. 44: F. A. MacNutt - Fernando Cortes and the Conquest of Mexico, 1485-1547 (1909) (link) - Hernan Cortes
- No. 45: Ruth Putnam - William the Silent, Prince of Orange 1533-1584; and the Revolt of the Netherlands (condensed edition, 1911) - William the Silent
- No. 46: Ernest F. Henderson - Blucher and the Uprising of Prussia Against Napoleon 1806-1815 (1911) - Marshal Blucher
- No. 47: Edmund Curtis - Roger the Great of Sicily and the Normans in Lower Italy, 1016-1154 (1912) - Roger II of Sicily
- No. 48: L. M. Larson - Canute the Great, 995-1035; and the Rise of Danish Imperialism During the Viking Age (1912) - King Cnut
- No. 49: Pietro Orsi - Cavour and the Making of Modern Italy, 1810-1861 (1914) - Count of Cavour
- No. 50: A. W. Pickard-Cambridge - Demosthenes and the Last Days of Greek Freedom, 384-322 B.C. (1914) (link) - Demosthenes

Some other books were initially intended to be part of the series, but were published separately after the 50-volume completion of the series:

- Ierne L. Plunket - Isabel of Castile and the Making of the Spanish Nation, 1451–1504 (1915) (link) - Isabella I of Castile
- Beatrice A. Lees - Alfred the Great, the Truth Teller, Maker of England, 848–899 (1915) (link) - Alfred the Great
- C. T. Atkinson - Marlborough and the Rise of the British Army (1921) - John Churchill, 1st Duke of Marlborough

== See also ==
- Story of the Nations series
