= The Story of the Nations =

Historical book series

The Story of the Nations Library is a historical book series started by the British publisher Thomas Fisher Unwin in 1885. The series was published in the USA by G. P. Putnam, though not in identical form.

There was also a compiled copy that is split up into two parts, of which one has been found that is The Story of the Nations Volume 1

Number	Year	Author	Title
1	1885	Arthur Gilman	Rome: From the Earliest Times to the End of the Republic
2	1885	James Kendall Hosmer	The Jews, Ancient, Mediaeval and Modern
3	1886	Sabine Baring-Gould	Germany
4	1886	Alfred John Church	Carthage; or the Empire of Africa
5	1887	John Pentland Mahaffy	Alexander's Empire
6	1887	Stanley Lane-Poole	The Moors in Spain
7	1887	George Rawlinson	Ancient Egypt
8	1887	Arminius Vambery	Hungary in Ancient, Mediaeval, and Modern Times
9	1887	Arthur Gilman	The Saracens: From the Earliest Times to the Fall of Bagdad
10	1887	Emily Lawless	Ireland
11	1887	Zenaide Ragozin	Chaldea: From the Earliest Times to the Rise of Assyria
12	1888	Henry Bradley	The Goths: From the Earliest Times to the End of the Gothic Dominion in Spain
13	1888	Zenaide Ragozin	Assyria: From the Rise of the Empire to the Fall of Nineveh
14	1888	Stanley Lane-Poole	Turkey
15	1886	James E. Thorold Rogers	Holland
16	1888	Gustave Masson	Mediaeval France: From the Reign of Hugues Capet to the Beginning of the Sixteenth Century
17	1888	S. G. W. Benjamin	Persia
18	1889	George Rawlinson	Phoenicia
19	1888	Zenaide Ragozin	Media, Babylon and Persia. Including a Study of the Zend-Avesta or Religion of Zoroasta, from the Fall of Nineveh to the Persian War
20	1889	Helen Zimmern	The Hansa Towns
21	1889	Alfred John Church	Early Britain
22	1890	Stanley Lane-Poole	The Barbary Corsairs
23	1890	William Richard Morfill	Russia
24	1896	William Douglas Morrison	The Jews under Roman Rule
25	1890	John Mackintosh	Scotland: From the Earliest Times to the Present Century
26	1890	Lina Hug; Richard Stead	Switzerland
27	1891	Susan Hale	Mexico
28	1891	Henry Morse Stephens	Portugal
29	1891	Sarah Orne Jewett	The Normans: Told Chiefly in Relation to their Conquest of England
30	1892	Charles Oman	Byzantine Empire
31	1892	Edward A. Freeman	Sicily: Phoenician, Greek and Roman
32	1892	Bella Duffy	The Tuscan Republics (Florence, Siena, Pisa and Lucca) with Genoa
33	1893	William Richard Morfill	Poland
34	1893	George Rawlinson	Parthia
35	1893	Greville Tregarthen	Australian Commonwealth (New South Wales, Tasmania, Victoria, Western Australia, South Australia, Queensland, New Zealand)
36	1893	Henry Edward Watts	Spain: Being a Summary of Spanish History from the Moorish Conquest to the Fall of Granada (711-1492 A.D.)
37	1894	David Murray	Japan
38	1894	George McCall Theal	South Africa (The Cape Colony, Natal, Orange Free State, South African Republic, Rhodesia) and all other territories south of the Zambesi
39	1894	Alethea Wiel	Venice
40	1894	T. A. Archer; Charles Lethbridge Kingsford	The Crusades: The Story of the Latin Kingdom of Jerusalem
41	1895	Zenaide Ragozin	Vedic India; As Embodied Principally in the Rig-Veda
42	1896	James Rodway	West Indies and the Spanish Main
43	1896	C. Edmund Maurice	Bohemia: From the Earliest Times to the Fall of National Independence in 1620, with a short summary of later events
44	1896	William Miller	The Balkans: Roumania, Bulgaria, Servia, and Montenegro
45	1896	John George Bourinot	Canada
46	1896	R. W. Frazer	British India
47	1897	André Lebon	Modern France 1789-1895
48	1898	Lewis Sergeant	The Franks: From their Origin as a Confederacy to the Establishment of the Kingdom of France and the German Empire
49	1899	Sidney Whitman	Austria
50	1898	Justin McCarthy	Modern England before the Reform Bill
51	1899	Robert K. Douglas	China
52	1899	Justin McCarthy	Modern England from the Reform Bill to the Present Time
53	1899	Martin A. S. Hume	Modern Spain 1788–1898
54	1900	Pietro Orsi	Modern Italy 1748-1898
55	1900	Hjalmar Hjorth Boyesen	A History of Norway from the Earliest Times
56	1901	Owen Morgan Edwards	Wales
57	1901	William Miller	Mediaeval Rome: From Hildebrand to Clement VIII, 1073-1600
58	1902	William Francis Barry	The Papal Monarchy: From St. Gregory the Great to Boniface VIII (590-1303)
59	1903	Stanley Lane-Poole	Mediaeval India under Mohammedan Rule (A.D. 712-1764)
60	1903	Thomas William Rhys Davids	Buddhist India
61	1903	Edward Jenks	Parliamentary England: The Evolution of the Cabinet System
62	1903	Mary Bateson	Mediaeval England 1066-1350
63	1905	L. Cecil Jane	The Coming of Parliament: England from 1350-1660
64	1905	Evelyn Shirley Shuckburgh	Greece: From the Coming of the Hellenes to A.D. 14
65	1908	Henry Stuart Jones	The Roman Empire, B.C. 29–A.D. 476

== See also ==
- Heroes of the Nations series
