= Adwan Rebellion =

Rebellion against Emirate of Transjordan

Date	16 September 1923
Location	Emirate of Transjordan
Result	Transjordanian government victory; Sultan Adwan's defeat and exile; Adwan Political Victory; Emir Abdullah dismissed the sitting government headed by Mezhar Ruslan to form a new cabinet as a result of the Adwan’s request

Belligerents
Sultan Adwan's forces	Transjordan (United Kingdom) United Kingdom: Pro-Hashemite tribesmen

Commanders and leaders
Sultan Adwan (surrendered); Majid Adwan (surrendered); Sayil al-Shahwān (executed)	Emir Abdullah I of Jordan; Minwer Shtewi Al-Hadid (United Kingdom) Frederick Peake

Units involved
Adwan; Ajarmah; Bani Hamidah	Arab Legion; Allied Tribesmen

Strength
300 horsemen 500 warriors	2 RAF Armored Cars; 3 RAF Bombers

Casualties and losses
86 (including 13 women)	Unknown
- About 100 killed, including Sheikh Sayil Al-Shahwan

The Adwan Rebellion or the Balqa Revolt was the largest uprising against the newly established Transjordanian government, headed by Emir Abdullah I and Prime Minister Mezhar Ruslan, during its first years.

The rebellion started due to a feud between the Adwan and the Bani Sakher tribes of the Balqa region led by Sultan Adwan and Mithqal Al-Fayez respectively. Mithqal was favored by Emir Abdullah and the Emir earned the ire of the Adwan for it. Emir Abdulah's attempt at reconciliation with the Adwan was rebuffed. The Adwan gained the sympathy of young urban Transjordanian intellectuals who began to demand a democratic rule and had been growing increasingly envious of the Lebanese, Syrians and Palestinians, who monopolized key positions of Transjordanian government.

Sultan Adwan arrived in Amman in August 1923 at the head of an armed demonstration demanding a constitutional government under the slogan "Jordan for Jordanians". He negotiated with the Emir who agreed to replace the government but arrested three figures for conspiring against the state. In response, Sultan Adwan later advanced on Amman again and occupied two gendarmerie outposts. The Adwan were defeated in a fierce battle with the Emir's forces led by British officer Frederick Peake. As a result, the revolt leader, Sultan Adwan, fled to Syria with his sons. A general pardon in March 1924 brought the matter to an end.

== Background ==
The most serious threats to emir Abdullah's position in Transjordan were repeated Wahhabi incursions from Najd into southern parts of his territory. The emir was powerless to repel those raids by himself, thus the British maintained a military base, with a small air force, at Marka, close to Amman. This force could have been easily used against the Wahhabi Ikhwan. The British military, which was the primary obstacle against the Ikhwan, and was also incorporated to help Emir Abdullah with the suppression of local rebellions at Kura and later by Sultan Adwan.

== Rebellion beginnings ==
With the end of the Kura affair, another challenge to Hashemite rule began to loom as the feud between the Bani Sakher bedouin, led by Mithqal Al Fayez—particularly favored by Emir Abdullah, and the Adwan bedouins of Balqa, headed by Sheikh Sultan Adwan. Dangerously exposed to the Wahhabi raids from Arabia, Emir Abdullah had no intention of alienating Sultan Adwan, even if he did pay a special attention to Bani Sakher. Opposing Abdullah's tribal policies, Sultan had received support from an unexpected direction—educated members of young generation in the large towns of Irbid, Salt and Karak, who began to criticize Abdullah's autocracy and demanded democratic rule. The new generation of urban intellectuals had been growing increasingly envious of the Lebanese, Syrians and Palestinians, who monopolized key positions of Transjordanian government and administration.

In August 1923, Sultan arrived in Amman at the head of an armed demonstration, openly backing popular demands for a constitutional, parliamentary government and pressure the emir for some urgent economic issues, but actually showing "who were the real masters of the Balqa region" (i.e. the Adwan and not Bani Sakher). Unprepared for the showdown, Emir Abdullah received Sultan, listened to his demands and promised his due consideration. To silence the opposition, the standing government was dismissed, and a new one formed. However, Abdullah decided that the show of defiance of established authority could not go unpunished and Mustafa Wahbi Tal and many other intellectual and political figures who had backed Sultan, were arrested and accused of conspiracy against the state.

== Sultan Adwan's attack ==
Becoming fearful of the consequences of Tal's trial, Sultan Adwan decided to strike first. He advanced on Amman in full force, and occupied two gendarmerie outposts, at the western entrances to the capital along the Amman-Jerusalem road.

Unlike the previous time, Peake's forces were well prepared. Adwani forces were defeated in a fierce battle and put to flight. The prisoners, taken among the attackers, were banished to the Hejaz, while Sultan and his sons fled to Syria, seeking refuge in Jabal al-Druze under the protection of Sultan al-Atrash.

== Aftermath ==
By March 1924, Sharif Hussein granted a general pardon permitted all Adwan exiles to return home upon his declaration that he was the new caliph. Sultan and Majid would both return to Trandjordan, with Majid later becoming a close advisor to Emir Abdullah until his death in 1946. Both Kura and Adwan rebellions made Abdullah understand the basic need for an effective armed force, even if such force was under British, rather than Arab command.

Some tribal unrests continued to simmer in the country for a few years after the suppression of Adwan insurrection. In 1926, the government had to send a force to suppress a rebellion in Wadi Musa, where the villagers refused to pay taxes and seized and looted the local gendarmerie post and government house.

== See also ==
- History of Jordan
- List of modern conflicts in the Middle East
