= Emirate of Transjordan =

British protectorate from 1921 to 1946

Coordinates: 31.9575°N 35.9475°E

Emirate of Trans-Jordan إمارة شرق الأردن (Arabic) Imārat Sharq al-Urdun
- 1921–1946
- Top: Flag (1922–1939); Bottom: Flag (1939–1946) Coat of arms

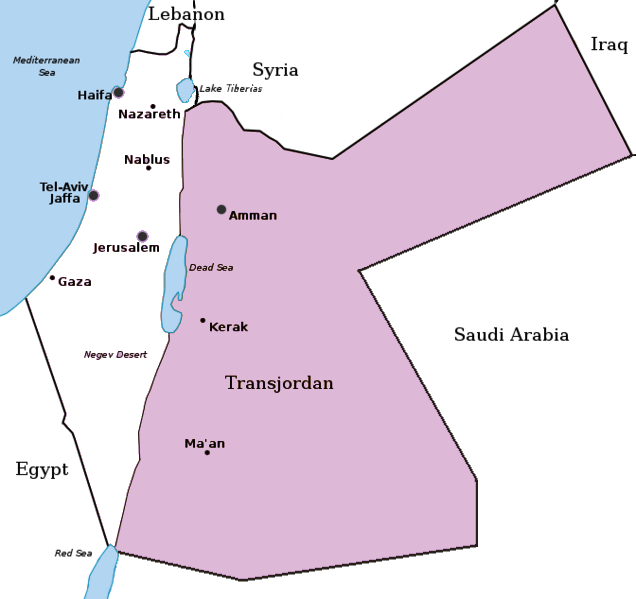
- The area administered by the Emirate
- Status: Class A League of Nations mandate of the United Kingdom
- Capital: Amman
- Official languages: Arabic
- Government: Absolute monarchy
- Emir
  - 1921–1946: Abdullah I
- High Commissioner
  - 1921–1925 (first): Herbert Samuel
  - 1945–1946 (last): Alan Cunningham
- Prime Minister
  - 1921 (first): Rashid Talaa
  - 1945–1946 (last): Ibrahim Hashem
- Historical era: Interwar; World War II; Cold War
  - Cairo Conference: March 1921
  - Established: 11 April 1921
  - Independence announcement: 25 April 1923
  - Anglo-Transjordanian treaty: 20 February 1928
  - Elevated to kingdom: 22 March 1946
  - Full independence: 25 May 1946

Population
  - 1921: 230,000 (estimate)
Preceded by	Succeeded by
Arab Kingdom of Syria; Interregnum (Transjordan)	Hashemite Kingdom of Transjordan
- Today part of: Jordan; Saudi Arabia; Iraq

The Emirate of Transjordan (Arabic: إمارة شرق الأردن, romanised: Imārat Sharq al-Urdun, lit. 'the emirate east of the Jordan'), officially the Emirate of Trans-Jordan, was an autonomous administrative division (under a League of Nations mandate) established on 11 April 1921, which remained as such until achieving formal independence as the Kingdom of Transjordan in 1946.

After the Ottoman defeat in World War I, the Transjordan region was administered within OETA East; after the British withdrawal in 1919, this region gained de facto recognition as part of the Hashemite-ruled Arab Kingdom of Syria, administering an area broadly comprising the areas of the modern countries of Syria and Jordan. Transjordan became a no man's land following the July 1920 Battle of Maysalun, during which period the British in neighbouring Mandatory Palestine chose to avoid "any definite connection between it and Palestine". Abdullah entered the region in November 1920, moving to Amman on 2 March 1921; later in the month a conference was held with the British during which it was agreed that Abdullah bin Hussein would administer the territory under the auspices of the British Mandate for Palestine with a fully autonomous governing system.

The Hashemite dynasty ruled the protectorate, as well as the neighboring Mandatory Iraq and, until 1925, the Kingdom of Hejaz (modern western Saudi Arabia) to the south. On 25 May 1946, the emirate became the "Hashemite Kingdom of Transjordan", achieving full independence on 17 June 1946 when in accordance with the Treaty of London ratifications were exchanged in Amman.

In April of 1950, after annexing the West Bank and "uniting" both banks of the Jordan river, it was constitutionally renamed the "Hashemite Kingdom of Jordan", commonly referred to as Jordan.

== Background ==
=== Relevant British agreements ===
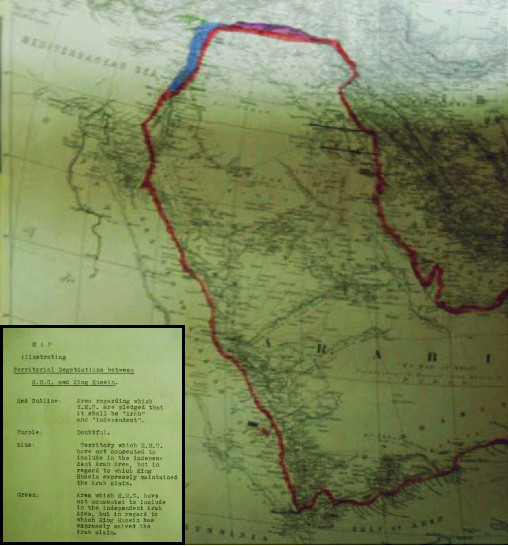
British government map "illustrating Territorial Negotiations between H.M.G. and King Hussein"

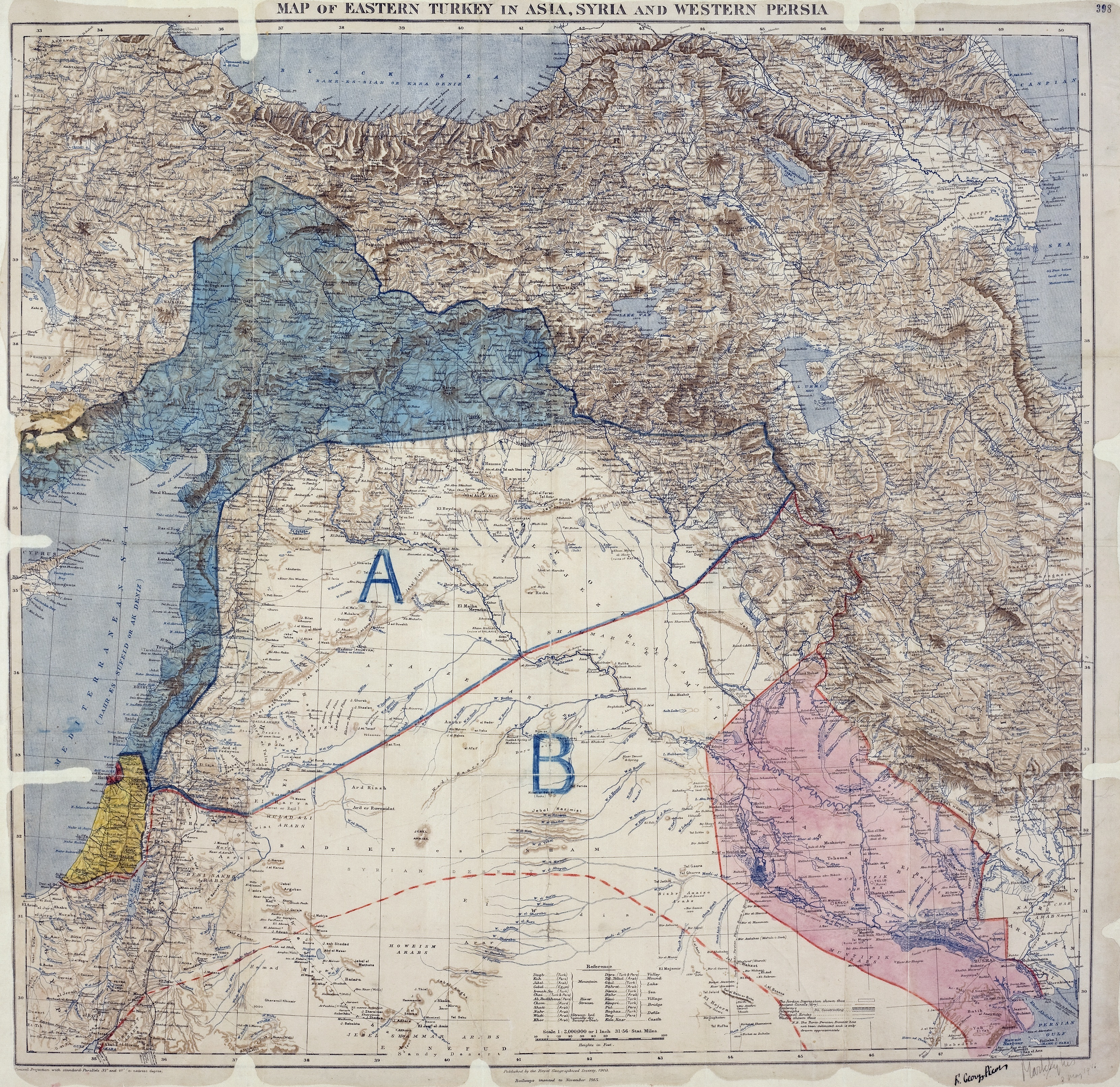
Map signed by Sykes and Picot, enclosed within the official Anglo-French correspondence

From July 1915 to March 1916, a series of ten letters were exchanged between Hussein bin Ali, Sharif of Mecca, and Lieutenant Colonel Sir Henry McMahon, British High Commissioner to Egypt. In the letters – particularly that of 24 October 1915 – the British government agreed to recognize Arab independence after the war in exchange for the Sharif of Mecca launching the Arab Revolt against the Ottoman Empire. The area of Arab independence was defined to be "in the limits and boundaries proposed by the Sherif of Mecca", with the exception of "portions of Syria" lying to the west of "the districts of Damascus, Homs, Hama and Aleppo"; conflicting interpretations of this description was to cause great controversy in subsequent years.

Around the same time, another secret treaty was negotiated between the United Kingdom and France, with assent from the Russian Empire and Italy, to define their mutually agreed spheres of influence and control in an eventual partition of the Ottoman Empire. The primary negotiations leading to the agreement occurred between 23 November 1915 and 3 January 1916, on which date the British and French diplomats, Mark Sykes and François Georges-Picot, initialled an agreed memorandum. The agreement was ratified by their respective governments on 9 and 16 May 1916. The agreement allocated to Britain control of what is today southern Israel and Palestine, Jordan and southern Iraq, and an additional small area that included the ports of Haifa and Acre to allow access to the Mediterranean. The Palestine region, with smaller boundaries than the later Mandatory Palestine, was to fall under an "international administration". The agreement was initially used directly as the basis for the 1918 Anglo–French Modus Vivendi which agreed on a framework for the Occupied Enemy Territory Administration in the Levant. Shortly after the war, the French ceded Palestine and Mosul to the British. The geographical area that was later to become Transjordan was allocated to Britain.

=== Late Ottoman rule ===
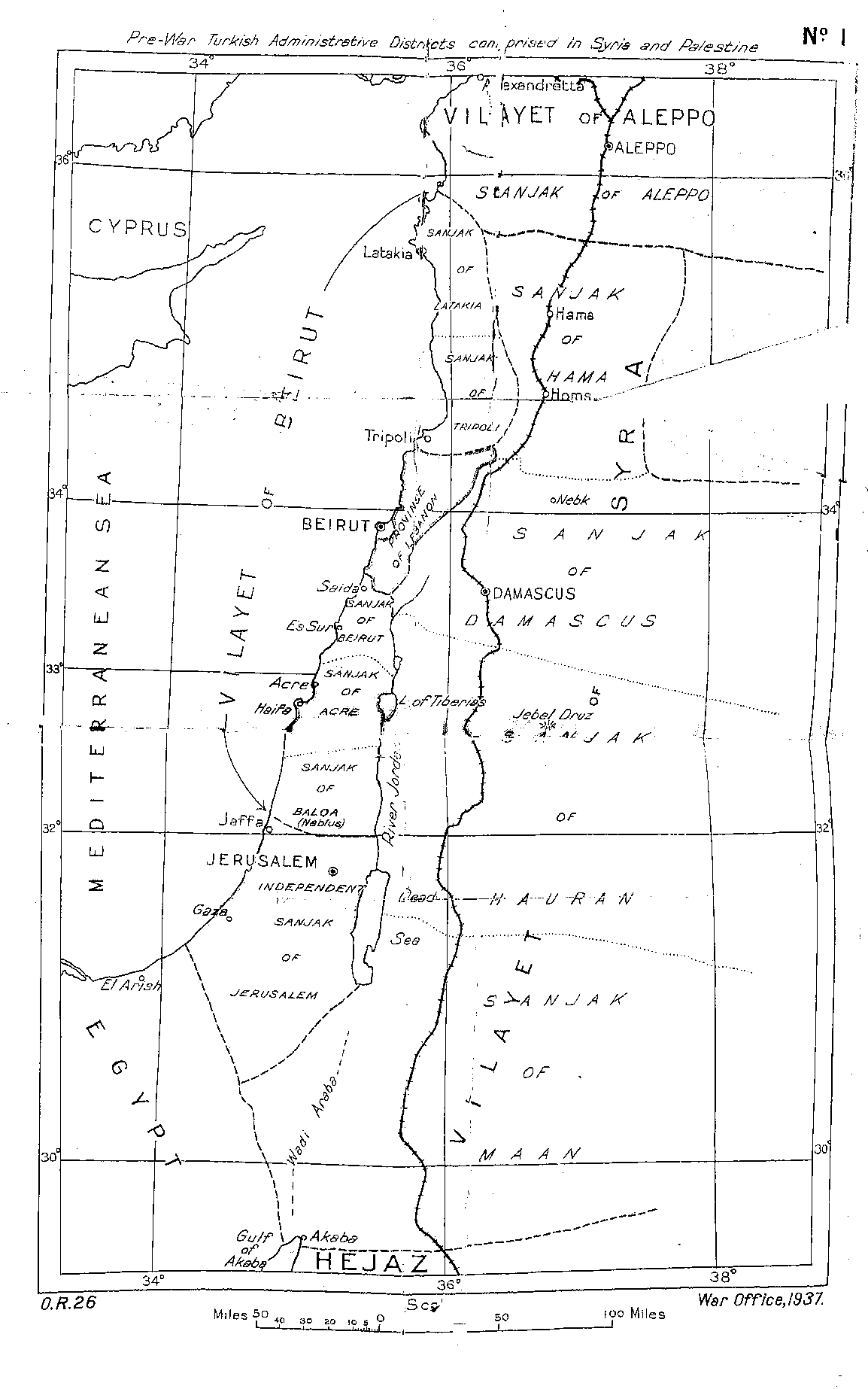
Ottoman Sanjaks covering the areas of Palestine, Transjordan, and Syria

Under the Ottoman Empire, most of Transjordan was part of the Syria Vilayet, primarily the sanjaks of Hauran and Ma'an. The inhabitants of northern Transjordan had traditionally associated with Syria, and those of southern Transjordan with the Arabian Peninsula. There was no Ottoman district known as Transjordan, there were the districts Ajlun, al-Balqa, al-Karak and Ma'an. In the second half of the nineteenth century, The Tanzimat laid the foundation for state formation in the area. The Hejaz railway was completed in 1908 and greatly facilitated the Hajj pilgrimage along the Syrian route from Damascus as well as extending the Ottoman military and administrative reach southwards.

== Establishment of the Emirate ==
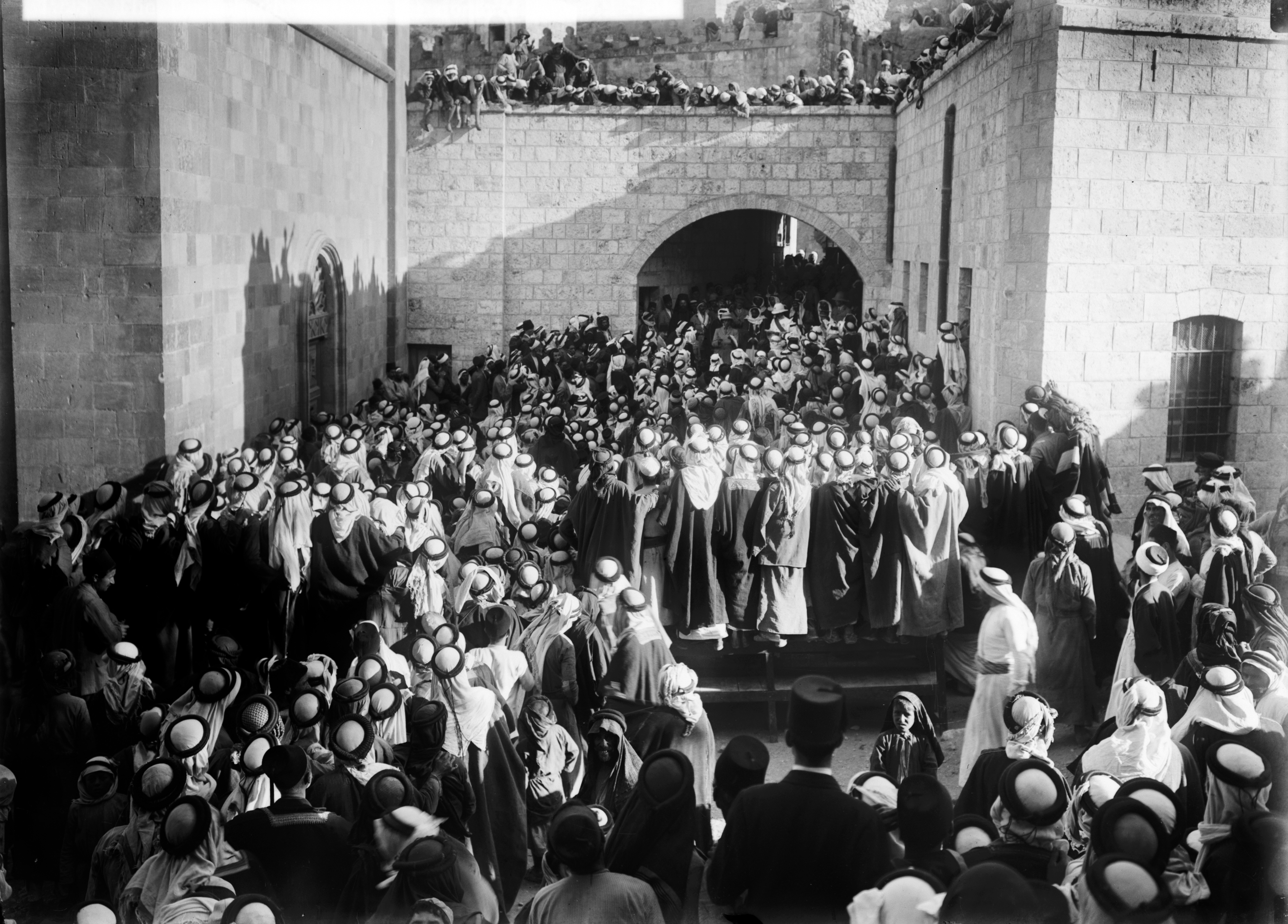
Herbert Samuel's proclamation in Salt, August 1920, for which he was admonished by Curzon

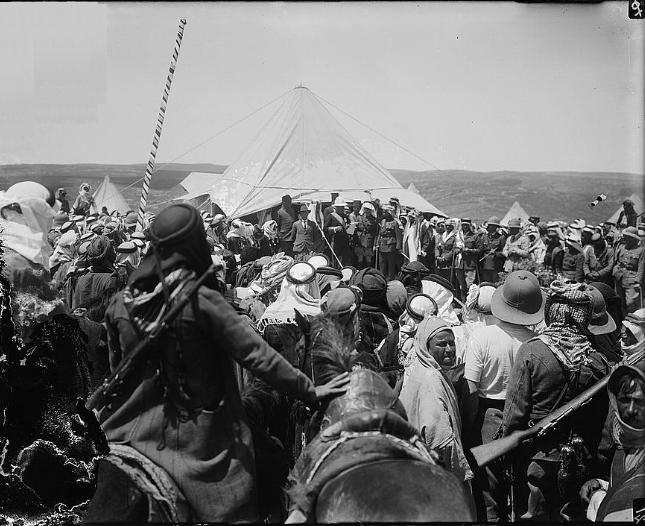
British High Commissioner Herbert Samuel reads a speech in front of a crowd, April 1921

=== Arab Revolt and Kingdom of Syria ===
During World War I, Transjordan saw much of the fighting of the Arab Revolt against Ottoman rule. Assisted by the British army officer T. E. Lawrence, the Sharif of Mecca Hussein bin Ali led the successful revolt which contributed to the Ottoman defeat and breaking up of its empire. Ottoman forces were forced to withdraw from Aqaba in 1917 after the Battle of Aqaba. In 1918 the British Foreign Office noted the Arab position East of the Jordan, Biger wrote: "At the beginning of 1918, soon after the southern part of Palestine was conquered, the Foreign Office determined that Faisal’s authority over the area that he controls on the Eastern side of the Jordan river should be recognized. We can confirm this recognition of ours even if our forces do not currently control major parts of Transjordan.’" In March 1920, the Hashemite Kingdom of Syria was declared by Faisal bin Hussein in Damascus which encompassed most of what later became Transjordan. At this point, the sparsely inhabited southern part of Transjordan was claimed by both Faisal's Syria and his father's Kingdom of Hejaz. Following the provision of mandate to France and Britain at the San Remo conference in April, the British appointed Sir Herbert Samuel High Commissioner in Palestine from 1 July 1920 with a remit over the area west of the Jordan.

=== The path to an Emirate ===
After the French ended the Kingdom of Syria at the battle of Maysalun, Transjordan became, for a short time, a no man's land or, as Samuel put it, "..left politically derelict". In August 1920, Sir Herbert Samuel's request to extend the frontier of British territory beyond the River Jordan and to bring Transjordan under his administrative control was rejected. The British Foreign Secretary, Lord Curzon, proposed instead that British influence in Transjordan should be advanced by sending a few political officers, without military escort, to encourage self-government and give advice to local leaders in the territory. Following Curzon's instruction Samuel set up a meeting with Transjordanian leaders where he presented British plans for the territory. The local leaders were reassured that Transjordan would not come under Palestinian administration and that there would be no disarmament or conscription. Samuel's terms were accepted, he returned to Jerusalem, leaving Captain Alec Kirkbride as the British representative east of the Jordan until the arrival on 21 November 1920 of Abdullah, the brother of recently deposed king Faisal, marched into Ma'an at the head of an army of 300 men from the Hejazi tribe of 'Utaybah. Without facing opposition Abdullah and his army had effectively occupied most of Transjordan by March 1921.

=== Relationship with Palestine ===
In early 1921, prior to the convening of the Cairo Conference, the Middle East Department of the Colonial Office set out the situation as follows:

Distinction to be drawn between Palestine and Trans-Jordan under the Mandate. His Majesty's Government are responsible under the terms of the Mandate for establishing in Palestine a national home for the Jewish people. They are also pledged by the assurances given to the Sherif of Mecca in 1915 to recognise and support the independence of the Arabs in those portions of the (Turkish) vilayet of Damascus in which they are free to act without detriment to French interests. The western boundary of the Turkish vilayet of Damascus before the war was the River Jordan. Palestine and Trans-Jordan do not, therefore, stand upon quite the same footing. At the same time, the two areas are economically interdependent, and their development must be considered as a single problem. Further, His Majesty's Government have been entrusted with the Mandate for "Palestine". If they wish to assert their claim to Trans-Jordan and to avoid raising with other Powers the legal status of that area, they can only do so by proceeding upon the assumption that Trans-Jordan forms part of the area covered by the Palestine Mandate. In default of this assumption Trans-Jordan would be left, under article 132 of the Treaty of Sèvres, to the disposal of the principal Allied Powers. Some means must be found of giving effect in Trans-Jordan to the terms of the Mandate consistently with "recognition and support of the independence of the Arabs".

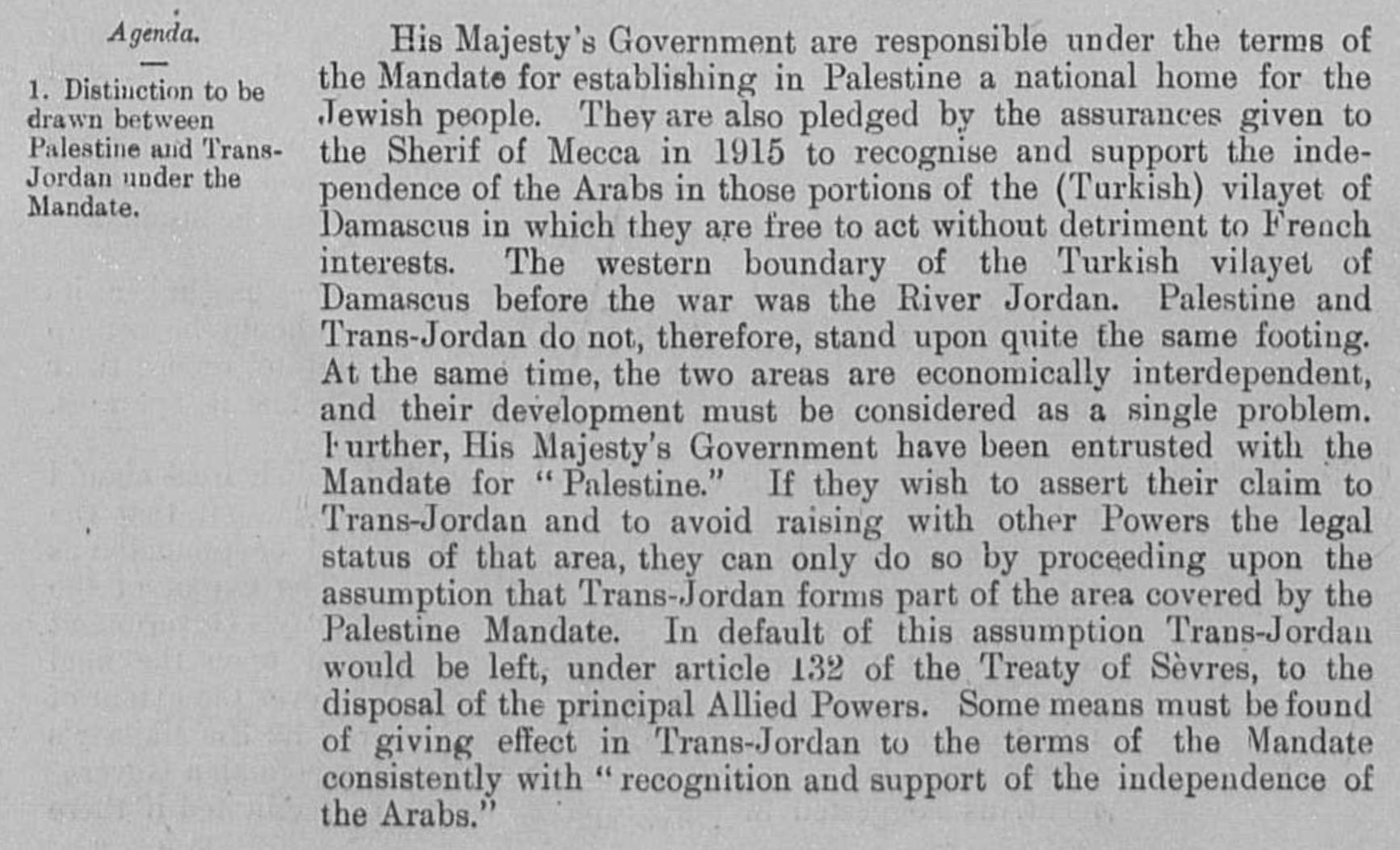
12 March 1921 British memorandum explaining the situation of Transjordan: "His Majesty's Government have been entrusted with the Mandate for 'Palestine'. If they wish to assert their claim to Trans-Jordan and to avoid raising with other Powers the legal status of that area, they can only do so by proceeding upon the assumption that Trans-Jordan forms part of the area covered by the Palestine Mandate. In default of this assumption Trans-Jordan would be left, under article 132 of the Treaty of Sèvres, to the disposal of the principal Allied Powers." From 12 to 25 March 1921, the inclusion of Transjordan in the mandate was formulated by the British government.

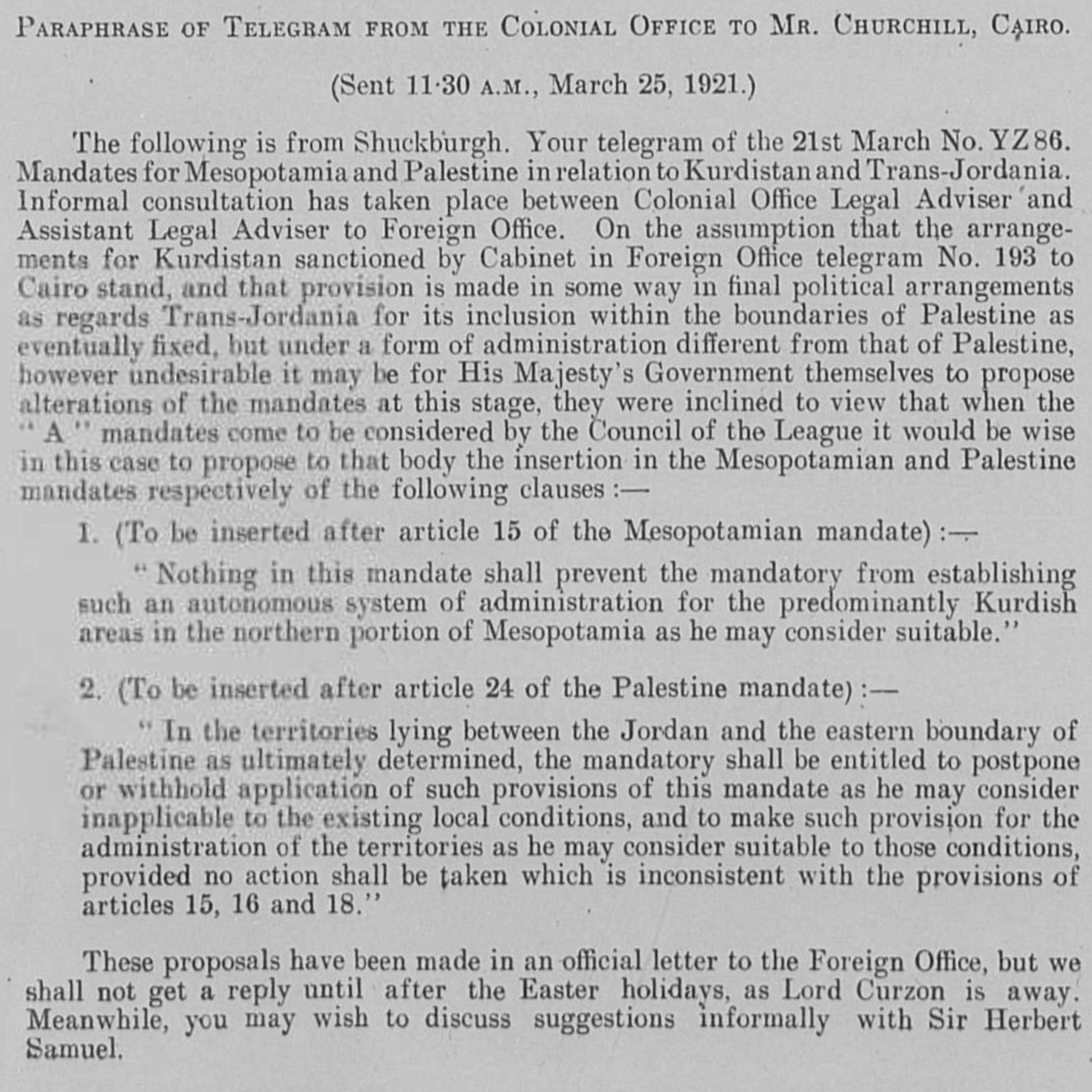
25 March 1921 proposal, approved a week later, to include Transjordan via Article 25: "On the assumption that ... provision is made in some way in final political arrangements as regards Trans-Jordania for its inclusion within the boundaries of Palestine as eventually fixed, but under a form of administration different from that of Palestine, however undesirable it may be for His Majesty's Government themselves to propose alterations of the mandates at this stage, they were inclined to view that when the "A" mandates come to be considered by the Council of the League it would be wise in this case to propose to that body the insertion...after article 24 of the Palestine mandate..." (Note: Klieman writes: "Accordingly, Churchill cabled the Colonial Office on 21 March, asking whether the Cairo proposals would necessitate any special provisions being made in the two mandates...Upon receipt of this cable informal consultation took place between the Colonial Office legal adviser and the assistant legal adviser to the Foreign Office. Their suggestion, on the 25th by Shuckburgh, was that...a clause be inserted in each of the mandates ... [Footnote:] The first draft of Article 25 was originally worded "to postpone the application of such provisions," but was altered at Shuckburgh's initiative since "'postpone' means, or may be taken to mean, that we are going to apply them eventually"")

The Cairo Conference of March 1921 was convened by Winston Churchill, then Britain's Colonial Secretary. With the mandates of Palestine and Iraq awarded to Britain, Churchill wished to consult with Middle East experts. At his request, Gertrude Bell, Sir Percy Cox, T. E. Lawrence, Sir Kinahan Cornwallis, Sir Arnold T. Wilson, Iraqi minister of war Jaʿfar alAskari, Iraqi minister of finance Sasun Effendi (Sasson Heskayl), and others gathered in Cairo, Egypt. An additional outstanding question was the policy to be adopted in Transjordan to prevent anti-French military actions from being launched within the allied British zone of influence. The Hashemites were Associated Powers during the war, and a peaceful solution was urgently needed. The two most significant decisions of the conference were to offer the throne of Iraq to emir Faisal ibn Hussein (who became Faisal I of Iraq) and an emirate of Transjordan (now Jordan) to his brother Abdullah ibn Hussein (who became Abdullah I of Jordan). The conference provided the political blueprint for British administration in both Iraq and Transjordan, and in offering these two regions to the sons of Hussein bin Ali, Churchill stated that the spirit, if not the letter, of Britain's wartime promises to the Arabs might be fulfilled. After further discussions between Churchill and Abdullah in Jerusalem, it was mutually agreed that Transjordan was accepted into the Palestine mandatory area as an Arab country apart from Palestine with the proviso that it would be, initially for six months, under the nominal rule of the emir Abdullah and that it would not form part of the Jewish national home to be established west of the River Jordan. Abdullah was then appointed Emir of the Transjordania region in April 1921.

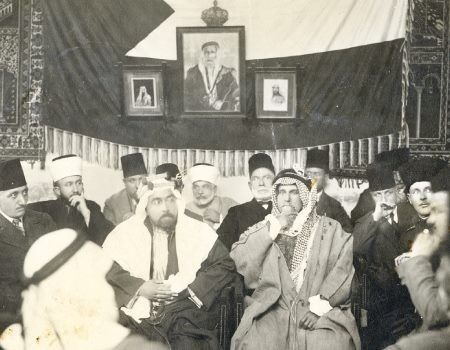
The first general election in Transjordan took place on 2 April 1929

On 21 March 1921, the Foreign and Colonial office legal advisers decided to introduce Article 25 into the Mandate for Palestine, which brought Transjordan under the Palestine mandate and stated that in that territory, Britain could 'postpone or withhold' those articles of the Mandate concerning a Jewish national home. It was approved by Curzon on 31 March 1921, and the revised final draft of the mandate (including Transjordan) was forwarded to the League of Nations on 22 July 1922. In August 1922, the British government presented a memorandum to the League of Nations stating that Transjordan would be excluded from all the provisions dealing with Jewish settlement, and this memorandum was communicated to the League on 12 August and approved by it on 16 September.

=== Establishment ===
Abdullah established his government on 11 April 1921. Britain administered the part west of the Jordan as Palestine, and the part east of the Jordan as Transjordan. Technically they remained one mandate, but most official documents referred to them as if they were two separate mandates. The Palestine Order in Council, 1922, which established the legal basis for the Mandatory Government in Palestine, explicitly excluded Transjordan from its application apart from giving the High Commissioner some discretionary power there. In April/May 1923 Transjordan was granted a degree of independence with Abdullah as ruler and St John Philby as chief representative.

The Hashemite emir Abdullah, elder son of Britain's wartime Arab ally Hussein bin Ali, was placed on the throne of Transjordan. The applicable parts of the Mandate for Palestine were stated in a decision of 16 September 1922, which provided for the separate administration of Transjordan. The government of the territory was, subject to the mandate, formed by Abdullah, brother of King Faisal I of Iraq, who had been at Amman since February 1921. Britain recognised Transjordan as an independent government on 15 May 1923, and gradually relinquished control, limiting its oversight to financial, military and foreign policy matters. This affected the goals of Revisionist Zionism, which sought a state on both banks of the Jordan. The movement claimed that it effectively severed Transjordan from Palestine, and so reduced the area on which a future Jewish state in the region could be established.

=== Borders ===
The southern border between Transjordan and Arabia was considered strategic for Transjordan in order to avoid being landlocked, with intended access to the sea via the Port of Aqaba. The southern region of Ma'an-Aqaba, a large area with a small population of just 10,000, was administered by OETA East (later the Arab Kingdom of Syria, and then Mandatory Transjordan) and claimed by the Kingdom of Hejaz. In OETA East, Faisal had appointed a kaymakam (or sub-governor) at Ma'an, whereas the kaymakam at Aqaba, who "disregarded both Husein in Mecca and Feisal in Damascus with impunity" had been instructed by Hussein to extend his authority to Ma'an. This technical dispute did not rise to any form of open struggle, and the Kingdom of Hejaz was to take de facto control after Faisal's administration was defeated by the French. (Note: Baker explained that "The British had moved in to take advantage of the situation created by Husain's presence in Aqaba and pressed for the annexation of the Hejaz Vilayet of Ma'an to the mandated territory of Transjordan. This disputed area, containing Maan, Aqaba and Petra, had originally been part of the Damascus Vilayet during Ottoman times, though boundaries had never been very precise. It was seized first by the Army as it pushed north from Aqaba after 1917 and had then been included in O.E.T.A. East and, later, in Faisal's kingdom of Syria. Husain, however, had never accepted this and had stationed a Vali alongside Faisal's administrator, but the two men had worked in harmony so that the dispute never came to an open struggle. After Faisal's exile, the French mandate boundary had excluded this area and the British then considered it to be part of the Syrian rump which became Transjordan, though nothing was done to realise that claim, so Hejaz administration held de facto control. Britain had, however, made its position clear in August 1924 when it cabled Bullard: "Please inform King Hussein officially that H.M.G. cannot acquiesce in his claim to concern himself directly with the administration of any portion of the territory of Transjordan for which H.M.G. are responsible under the mandate for Palestine"") Following the 1924–25 Saudi conquest of Hejaz, Hussein's army fled to the Ma'an region, which was then formally announced as annexed by Abdullah's Transjordan. Ibn Saud privately agreed to respect this position in an exchange of letters at the time of the 1927 Treaty of Jeddah.

The Negev region was added to Palestine on 10 July 1922, having been conceded by British representative John Philby "in Trans-Jordan's name". (Note: Biger described this meeting as follows: "Sovereignty over the Arava, from the south of the Dead Sea to Aqaba, was also discussed. Philby agreed, in Trans-Jordan's name, to give up the western bank of Wadi Arava (and thus all of the Negev area). Nevertheless, a precise borderline was still not determined along the territories of Palestine and Trans-Jordan. Philby's relinquishment of the Negev was necessary, because the future of this area was uncertain. In a discussion regarding the southern boundary, the Egyptian aspiration to acquire the Negev area was presented. On the other hand the southern part of Palestine belonged, according to one of the versions, to the sanjak (district) of Ma'an within the vilayet (province) of Hejaz. King Hussein of Hijaz demanded to receive this area after claiming that a transfer action, to add it to the vilayet of Syria (A-Sham) was supposed to be done in 1908. It is not clear whether this action was completed. Philby claimed that Emir Abdullah had his father's permission to negotiate over the future of the sanjak of Ma'an, which was actually ruled by him, and that he could therefore 'afford to concede' the area west of the Arava in favour of Palestine. This concession was made following British pressure and against the background of the demands of the Zionist Organization for direct contact between Palestine and the Red Sea. It led to the inclusion of the Negev triangle in Palestine's territory, although this area was not considered as part of the country in the many centuries that preceded the British occupation.") Abdullah made a request for the Negev to be added to Transjordan in late 1922, and again in 1925, but this was rejected.

The location of the Eastern border between Transjordan and Iraq was considered strategic with respect to the proposed construction of what became the Kirkuk–Haifa oil pipeline. It was first set out on 2 December 1922, in a treaty to which Transjordan was not party to – the Uqair Protocol between Iraq and Nejd. It described the western end of the Iraq-Nejd boundary as "the Jebel Anazan situated in the neighbourhood of the intersection of latitude 32 degrees north longitude 39 degrees east where the Iraq-Najd boundary terminated", thereby implicitly confirming this as the point at which the Iraq-Nejd boundary became the Transjordan-Nejd boundary. This followed a proposal from Lawrence in January 1922 that Transjordan be extended to include Wadi Sirhan as far south as al-Jauf, in order to protect Britain's route to India and contain Ibn Saud.

France transferred the District of Ramtha from Syria in 1921.

=== Population ===
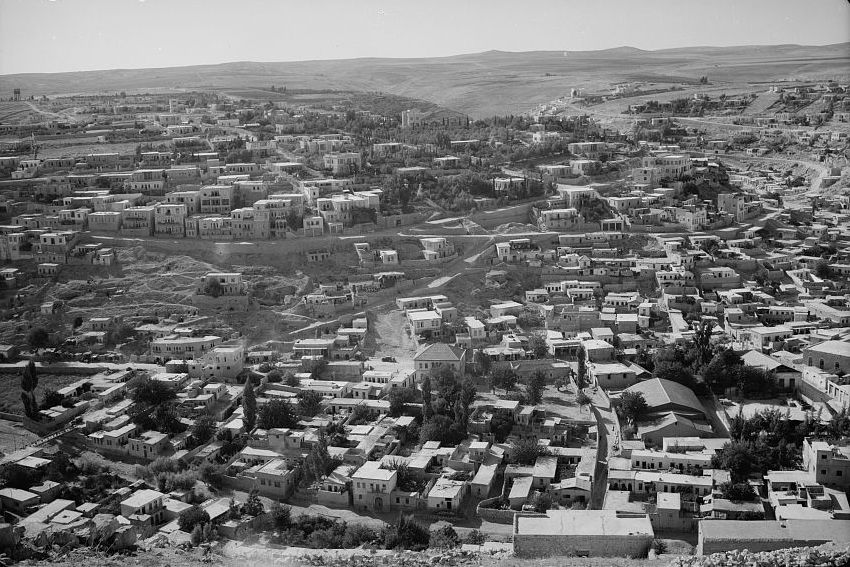
Amman in 1940

With respect to the demographics, in 1924 the British stated: "No census of the population has been taken, but the figure is thought to be in the neighbourhood of 200,000, of whom some 10,000 are Circassians and Chechen; there are about 15,000 Christians and the remainder, in the main, are Moslem Arabs." No census was taken throughout the British mandate period, but the population was estimated to have grown to 300,000 – 350,000 by the early 1940s.

March 1921 British estimate of Transjordan population
Territory	Population
Ajloun, comprising Irbid, Jerash and the Bani Hasan country and the bedouins Mafraq	100,000
Balqa', comprising Al-Salt, Amman and Madaba	80,000
Al-Karak, including Tafilah	40,000
Ma'an, Aqaba, and Tabuk (today in Saudi Arabia)	10,000
Total	230,000
Estimates by FitzRoy Somerset and Frederick Peake, 14 March 1921, CO 733/15 (Note: From "Observations on Dr. Weizmann's letter to the Secretary of State for the Colonies with Reference to Transjordania," Major Somerset and Captain Peake, 14 March 1921, CO 733/15. Wilson notes that the letter was written to refute Weizmann's 1 March 1921 letter to Churchill in which Weizmann argues for the inclusion of Transjordan in the Jewish National Home area: "The beautiful Trans-Jordanian plateaux... lie neglected and uninhabited, save for a few scattered settlements and a few roaming Bedouin tribes.")

=== Defence ===
The most serious threats to Abdullah's position in Transjordan were repeated Wahhabi incursions by the Ikhwan tribesmen from Najd in modern Saudi Arabia into southern parts of his territory. The emir was powerless to repel those raids by himself, and had to appeal for help to the British who maintained a military base with a small air force at Marka, close to Amman. The British military force was the primary obstacle against the Ikhwan between 1922 and 1924, and was also utilised to help Abdullah with the suppression of local rebellions at Kura, and later by Sultan Adwan, in 1921 and 1923 respectively.

== Establishment of the kingdom ==
Agreement between His Majesty and the Amir of Trans- Jordan, signed at Jerusalem, 20 February 1928, cmd. 3488

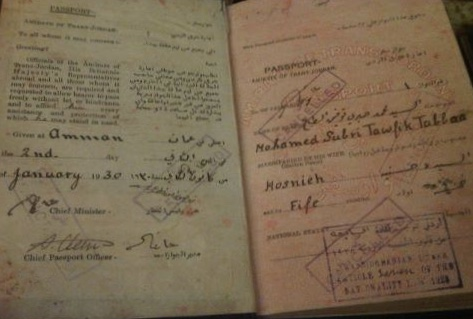
1930 Transjordan passport

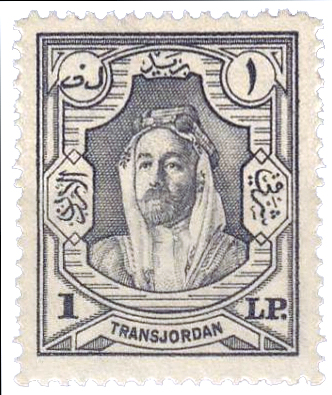
1930 Transjordan stamp

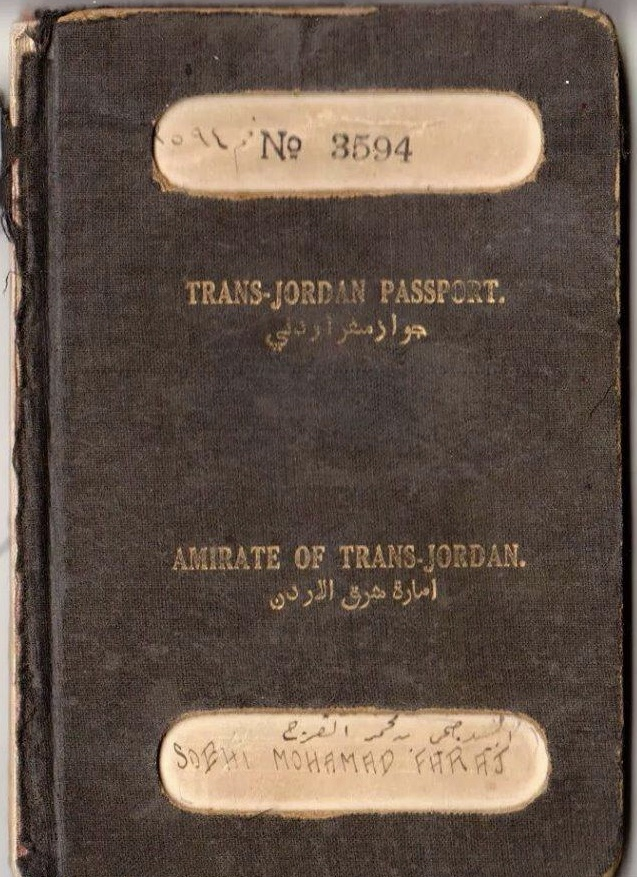
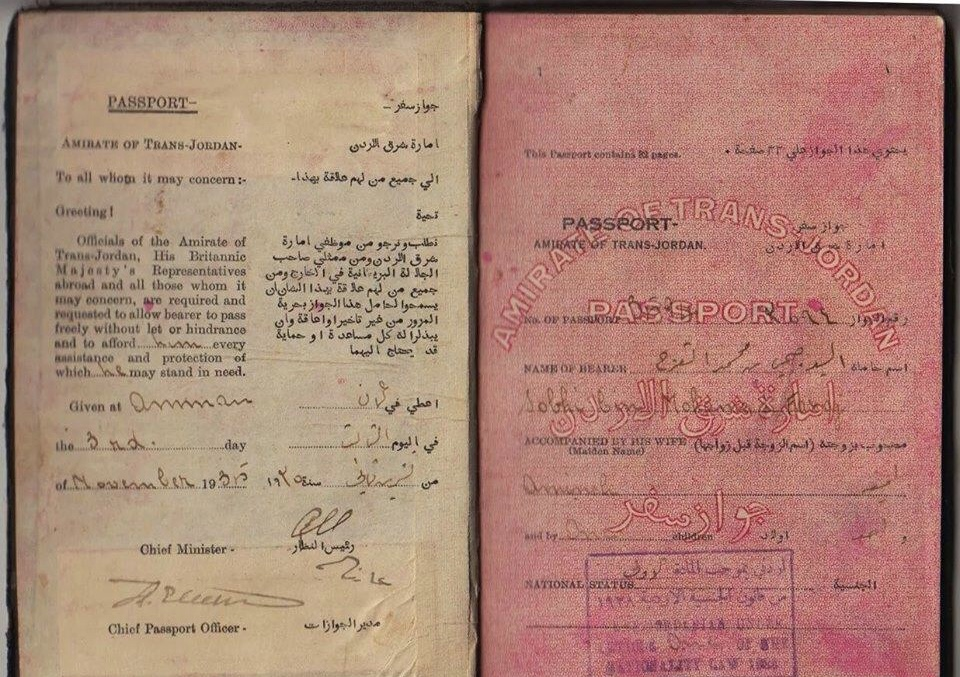
1935 Transjordan passports

Transfer of authority to an Arab government took place gradually in Transjordan, starting with Abdullah's appointment as Emir of Transjordan on 1 April 1921, and the formation of his first government on 11 April 1921. (Note: Alon writes: "Abdullah accepted Churchill's offer and returned to Amman to organise his new rule. He dissolved the local governments formed by the British and established three administrative provinces (liwa’): cAjlun, Balqa’ and Karak. On 11 April 1921 he formed his first government. The newly appointed central administration was mainly staffed by Arab nationalist exiles. The first government was composed of four Syrians, a Palestinian, a Hijazi and only one native Transjordanian. The British offered financial assistance, administrative guidance and military support from Palestine upon request and maintained a watchful position. The sole organised and effective military force at hand was a Hijazi household army of some 200 men under Hashemite command. Peake's Reserve Force was still under construction and dysfunctional. (pg 40); From early 1922 until the autumn of 1923 the country enjoyed a period of stability during which the central administration succeeded in asserting its authority over the settled population. A change of personalities, resulting in more sympathetic British Representatives, Abdullah's recognition of his precarious situation, and an improved attitude of the Palestine government towards the independent administration of the country, contributed to the stabilisation of Transjordan and the subjugation of the settled tribes to the government's authority. More importantly, the resurrection of the Reserve Force, later renamed the Arab Legion, allowed for this success. (pg 49); Thus, in the summer of 1922, the government managed to gain the submission of the settled and semi-settled tribes. Peake and Philby reported on the satisfactory collection of taxes and good public order.45 Macan Abu Nowar asserts that, as early as August 1922, Abdullah could already point to several achievements in the process of state-building. His government maintained law and order, improved tax-collection, opened new schools and clinics, built roads, established telegraph and post office services and created sharci and civil courts. (pg 50)") The independent administration was recognised in a statement made public (the statement had been agreed in October 1922 following the approval of the revised Mandate on 16 September 1922 with publication made conditional on completion of a probationary period) in Amman on 25 May 1923: "Subject to the approval of the League of Nations, His Britannic Majesty will recognise the existence of an independent Government in Trans-jordan under the rule of His Highness the Amir Abdullah, provided that such Government is constitutional and places His Britannic Majesty in a position to fulfil his international obligations in respect of the territory by means of an Agreement to be concluded with His Highness" (Note: Gubser wrote: "During World War I, Transjordan (as it was then called) was the scene of most of the fighting of the great Arab Revolt against Ottoman rule. Assisted by the British and the famous Lawrence of Arabia (T. E. Lawrence), Sharif Hussein of Mecca led this successful revolt, which contributed to the Ottoman defeat in World War I and to the eventual establishment of the various Arab states. Jordan originally fell under the rule of King Faisal, son of Sharif Hussein and the principal military leader of the Arab Revolt. Jordanians, along with their Arab brothers from other regions, served in the new Arab government and sat in its parliament. After King Faisal was forced from the throne in July 1920 by the French military, the British high commissioner of Palestine, Sir Herbert Samuel, went to the town of Salt in Transjordan and declared that the territory, as had been secretly agreed by the British and French in the Sykes-Picot Agreement during World War I, was part of the British Mandatory Palestine. Amir (Prince) Abdullah, a younger son of Sharif Hussein, arrived in Jordan in the fall of 1920 with the intent of regaining Damascus for his Hashemite family. Because he had gained a following, the British decided to recognise his leadership in that territory and provide him with a subsidy in exchange for his not pursuing his original Damascus intentions. This arrangement was confirmed in a 27 March 1921, meeting between then colonial secretary, Winston Churchill, and Amir Abdullah. In addition, Jordan was officially removed from Britain's Palestine mandate and given a mandate status of its own. Between the two world wars, Amir Abdullah, with considerable assistance from Britain, established Hashemite authority in Jordan, basing his rule in the new capital of Amman.")

During the eleventh session of the League of Nations' Permanent Mandates Commission in 1927, Sir John E. Shuckburgh summarised the status of Transjordan:

It is not part of Palestine but it is part of the area administered by the British Government under the authority of the Palestine Mandate. The special arrangements there really go back to the old controversy about our war time pledges to the Arabs which I have no wish to revive. The point is that on our own interpretation of those pledges the country East of the Jordan – though not the country West of the Jordan – falls within the area in respect of which we promised during the war to recognise and support the independence of the Arabs. Transjordan is in a wholly different position from Palestine and it was considered necessary that special arrangements should be made there

=== 1928 treaty ===
Transfer of most administrative functions occurred in 1928, including the creation of the post of High Commissioner for Transjordan. (Note: Article 1 of the February 1928 agreement stated: "His Highness the Amir agrees that His Britannic Majesty shall be represented in Trans-Jordan by a British Resident acting on behalf of the High Commissioner for Trans-Jordan.") The status of the mandate was not altered by the agreement between the United Kingdom and the Emirate concluded on 20 February 1928. It recognised the existence of an independent government in Transjordan and defined and limited its powers. The ratifications were exchanged on 31 October 1929." (Note: Bentwich wrote: "An agreement was made in February 1928, between His Britannic Majesty and the Emir of Transjordan, varying in important respects the execution of the Mandate for Transjordan which was conferred with the Mandate for Palestine in 1922. There was, indeed, no separate Mandate for Transjordan; but by a resolution of the Council of the League of Nations, passed in September 1922, at the suggestion of the British Government, certain provisions of the Mandate for Palestine were, in accordance with Article 25 of that Mandate, declared not applicable in the territory lying east of the Jordan and the Dead Sea. It was further provided in the application of the Mandate to Transjordan that the action which in Palestine is taken by the Administration of Palestine will be taken by the Administration of Transjordan under the general supervision of the Mandatory. A declaration by the British Government was approved to the effect that His Majesty's Government accepts full responsibility as Mandatory for Transjordan, and undertakes that such provision as may be made for the administration of that territory shall be in no way inconsistent with those provisions of the Mandate which are not declared inapplicable by the resolution.")

Transjordan remained under British control until the first-Transjordanian treaty was concluded in 1928. Transjordan became nominally independent, although the British still maintained a military presence and control of foreign affairs and retained some financial control over the Emirate. This failed to respond to Transjordanian demands for a fully sovereign and independent state, a failure that led to widespread disaffection with the treaty among Transjordanians, prompting them to seek a national conference (25 July 1928), the first of its kind, to examine the articles of the treaty and adopt a plan of political action.

According to the U.S. State Department Digest of International Law, the status of the mandate was not altered by the agreement between the United Kingdom and the Emirate concluded on 20 February 1928 which recognised the existence of an independent government in Transjordan and defined and limited its powers. The ratifications were exchanged on 31 October 1929."

=== 1946 independence ===
1946 Treaty of Alliance between His Majesty in respect of the United Kingdom and His Highness the Amir of Trans-Jordan, cmd. 6779

On 17 January 1946, Ernest Bevin, the British Foreign Secretary, announced in a speech at the General Assembly of the United Nations that the British Government intended to take steps in the near future to establish Transjordan as a fully independent and sovereign state. The Treaty of London was signed by the British Government and the Emir of Transjordan on 22 March 1946 as a mechanism to recognise the full independence of Transjordan upon ratification by both countries parliaments. Transjordan's impending independence was recognised on 18 April 1946 by the League of Nations during the last meeting of that organisation. On 25 May 1946 the Transjordan became the "Hashemite Kingdom of Transjordan" when the ruling 'Amir' was re-designated as 'King' by the parliament of Transjordan on the day it ratified the Treaty of London. 25 May is still celebrated as independence day in Jordan although officially the mandate for Transjordan ended on 17 June 1946 when in accordance with the Treaty of London the ratifications were exchanged in Amman and Transjordan gained full independence. In 1949 the country's official name was changed to the "Hashemite Kingdom of Jordan".

When King Abdullah applied for membership in the newly formed United Nations, his request was vetoed by the Soviet Union, citing that the nation was not "fully independent" of British control. This resulted in another treaty in March 1948 with Britain in which all restrictions on sovereignty were removed. Despite this, Jordan was not a full member of the United Nations until 14 December 1955. The Anglo-American treaty, also known as the Palestine Mandate Convention, permitted the US to delay any unilateral British action to terminate the mandate. The earlier proclamation of the independence of Syria and Lebanon had said "the independence and sovereignty of Syria and Lebanon will not affect the juridical situation as it results from the Mandate Act. Indeed, this situation could be changed only with the agreement of the Council of the League of Nations, with the consent of the Government of the United States, a signatory of the Franco-American Convention of 4 April 1924".

The U.S. adopted the policy that formal termination of the mandate with respect to Transjordan would follow the earlier precedent established by the French Mandate for Syria and the Lebanon. That meant termination would generally be recognised upon the admission of Transjordan into the United Nations as a fully independent country. Members of the U.S. Congress introduced resolutions demanding that the U.S. Representative to the United Nations be instructed to seek postponement of any international determination of the status of Transjordan until the future status of Palestine as a whole was determined. The U.S. State Department also received a legal argument from Rabbis Wise and Silver objecting to the independence of Transjordan. At the 1947 Pentagon Conference, the U.S. advised Great Britain it was withholding recognition of Transjordan pending a decision on the Palestine question by the United Nations.

Transjordan applied for membership of the United Nations on 26 June 1946. The Polish representative said that he did not object to the independence of Transjordan, but requested that the application be postponed for a year on the grounds that legal procedures required by the Covenant of the League of Nations had not been carried out. The British representative responded that the League of Nations had already approved the termination of the mandate in Transjordan. When the issue was voted on, Transjordan's application achieved the required total number of votes, but was vetoed by the Soviet Union which did not approve membership of any countries with which it did not have diplomatic relations. This problem and similar problems caused by vetoes of the memberships of Ireland, Portugal, Austria, Finland and Italy took several years and many votes to solve. Jordan was finally admitted to membership on 14 December 1955.

== See also ==
- Lordship of Transjordan
- Transjordan (region)

== Bibliography ==
=== Cited sources ===
- Amadouny, Vartan (2012). "The Evolution of the Transjordan-Iraq Boundary, 1915–40". In Clive H. Schofield and Richard N. Schofield (ed.). The Middle East and North Africa: World Boundaries. Routledge. ISBN 978-1-134-88028-7. Archived from the original on 13 August 2021.
- Baker, Randall (1979). King Husain and the Kingdom of Hejaz. The Oleander Press. p. 220. ISBN 978-0-900891-48-9. Archived from the original on 13 August 2021.
- Bentwich, Norman (1929). "The Mandate for Transjordan". British Yearbook of International Law. 10. Humphrey Sumner Milford: 212. Archived from the original on 29 June 2018.
- Eilon, Joab B.; Alon, Yoav (15 April 2007). The Making of Jordan: Tribes, Colonialism and the Modern State. I.B.Tauris. ISBN 978-1-84511-138-0. Archived from the original on 23 April 2020.
- Gubser, Peter (1 January 1991). Historical Dictionary of the Hashemite Kingdom of Jordan. Scarecrow Press. ISBN 978-0-8108-2449-2. Archived from the original on 1 August 2020.
- Hughes, Matthew (2013). Allenby and British Strategy in the Middle East, 1917-1919. Routledge. ISBN 978-1-136-32395-9. Archived from the original on 21 December 2019.
- Huneidi, Sahar (2001). A Broken Trust: Sir Herbert Samuel, Zionism and the Palestinians. I.B.Tauris. p. 84. ISBN 978-1-86064-172-5. Archived from the original on 25 December 2019.
- Kattan, Victor (June 2009). From coexistence to conquest: international law and the origins of the Arab-Israeli conflict, 1891–1949. Pluto Press. ISBN 978-0-7453-2579-8. Archived from the original on 19 December 2019.
- Kedouri, Elie (2014). In the Anglo-Arab Labyrinth: The McMahon-Husayn Correspondence and Its Interpretations 1914-1939. Routledge. ISBN 978-1-135-30842-1. Archived from the original on 19 December 2019.
- Klieman, Aaron S. (1970). Foundations of British policy in the Arab world: the Cairo Conference of 1921. Johns Hopkins Press. ISBN 9780801811258. Archived from the original on 9 June 2021.
- Leatherdale, Clive (1983). Britain and Saudi Arabia, 1925–1939: The Imperial Oasis. Psychology Press. pp. 41–42. ISBN 978-0-7146-3220-9. Archived from the original on 13 August 2021.
- Rudd, Jeffery A. (1993). Abdallah bin al-Husayn: The Making of an Arab Political Leader, 1908-1921 (PDF) (PhD). SOAS Research Online. pp. 45–46. Archived (PDF) from the original on 15 December 2020.
- Salibi, Kamal S. (1998). The Modern History of Jordan. London: I B Tauris. ISBN 978-1860643316.
- Wasserstein, Bernard (2008). Israel and Palestine: Why They Fight and Can They Stop?. Profile Books. ISBN 978-1-84668-092-2.
- Wilson, Mary Christina (1990). King Abdullah, Britain and the Making of Jordan. Cambridge University Press. ISBN 978-0-521-39987-6. Archived from the original on 22 December 2019.
- Pappé, Ilan (2004). A History of Modern Palestine: One Land, Two Peoples. Cambridge University Press. ISBN 978-0-521-55632-3.

=== General references ===
- Bradshaw, Tancred (30 March 2012). Britain and Jordan: Imperial Strategy, King Abdullah I and the Zionist Movement. I.B.Tauris. ISBN 978-0-85772-114-3. Archived from the original on 23 April 2020.
- Kirkbride, Sir Alec Seath (1956). A Crackle of Thorns: Experiences in the Middle East. J. Murray. Archived from the original on 1 August 2020.
- Paris, Timothy J. (2003). Britain, the Hashemites and Arab Rule: The Sherifian Solution. Routledge. ISBN 978-1-135-77191-1. Archived from the original on 22 December 2019.
- Patai, Raphael (8 December 2015). Kingdom of Jordan. Princeton University Press. ISBN 978-1-4008-7799-7. Archived from the original on 1 August 2020.
- Sicker, Martin (1999). Reshaping Palestine: From Muhammad Ali to the British Mandate, 1831–1922. Greenwood Publishing Group. ISBN 978-0-275-96639-3. Archived from the original on 27 December 2019.
- Vatikiotis, P.J. (18 May 2017). Politics and the Military in Jordan: A Study of the Arab Legion, 1921–1957. Taylor & Francis. ISBN 978-1-351-78303-3. Archived from the original on 1 August 2020.
