= James Strachan-Davidson =

English classical scholar and Master of Baliol College (1843-1916)

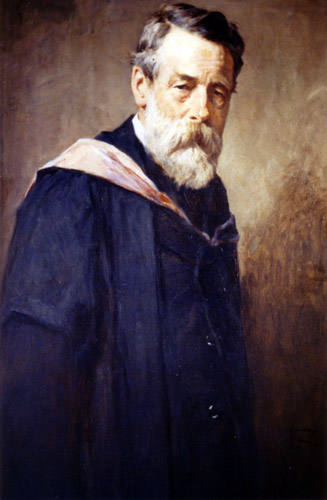
- Portrait by George Reid, c. 1911
- Born: James Leigh Strachan; 22 October 1843; Byfleet, Surrey, England
- Died: 28 March 1916 (aged 72); Oxford, England
- Burial place: Holywell Cemetery, Oxford
- Occupations: Classical scholar; President of the Oxford Union; Master of Balliol College, Oxford

James Leigh Strachan-Davidson (né Strachan; 22 October 1843 – 28 March 1916) was an English classical scholar, academic administrator, translator, and author of books on Roman history. He was Master of Balliol College, Oxford, from 1907 until his death in 1916.

== Early life ==
James Leigh Strachan was born in Byfleet, Surrey, southern England, to James Strachan, a Scottish merchant, and Mary Anne Richardson. He was the eldest among three brothers and had a half-sister from his father's first marriage. His mother died while they were still children and his father remarried. In 1861, he and his father took the surname of Davidson when the family inherited a small estate in Ardgaith, Perthshire.

== Education and career ==
Strachan-Davidson was enrolled at Leamington College at the age of eleven as day-boy. Though not considered to be a robust boy, he played cricket well enough to be a part of the college team. In 1862, he enrolled as a Warner Exhibitioner in Balliol College, Oxford, where he studied the classics. He won the Jenkyns Exhibition in the college in 1864 and was appointed as a fellow of the college in 1866 after his finals. He graduated from Oxford with first-class honours in both Classical Moderations (1864) and Literae Humaniores (1866). He actively participated in the Oxford Union, held the posts of secretary and librarian, and was appointed as the president of the society in 1867.

He was appointed as the Classical tutor at Balliol College in 1872 and mainly lectured in the field of Roman history. He became the senior dean of the college in 1875, who was also the president of the college's Common Room, and acting head in the master's absence. He was elected to the chairmanship of the board of Faculty of Arts in 1893. He received the honorary degree of Doctor of Civil Law (DCL) from the University of Oxford for his contributions to the study of Roman criminal law. Upon Edward Caird's resignation due to poor health, he was unanimously elected as the master of Balliol College, in 1907; a position he held until his death in 1916.

In 1899, he was appointed by the colonial secretary, Joseph Chamberlain, to a committee considering the position of students holding UK scholarships granted by colonial governments. Lord Cromer consulted him about teaching Arabic to men appointed to the Egyptian and Sudanese civil service in 1903–04.

== Political views ==
Over the course of his many debates as part of the Oxford Union, he spoke in favour of the Confederate States in the American Civil War, Bismarck's policies, and the end of Turkish rule in Europe. He also consistently supported women's suffrage, and advocated that "international morality demanded that England relinquish India." He also spoke against Lord Palmerston's policy of non-intervention in the Schleswig-Holstein question. He was firmly liberal on the matter of education and University reform and espoused the importance of character and attainments over party adherence for University representatives.

He was consulted extensively by the Civil Service Commissioners during the reformation of the entrance examination of the Indian Civil Service. He believed that the mental and moral discipline, wide view and grasp of fundamentals granted by the study of Literae Humaniores was crucial to the Service and drew up a memorandum to that effect, for its Royal Commission in June 1913.

== Personal life ==
Strachan-Davidson was devoted to his work at Balliol College and never married. He believed that the college should be as "wife and children" to a fellow of the college. He was a friend of the English author Paul Ferdinand Willert and was godfather to his daughter, Dorothy. He was also close to his family doctor Robert Slack whose daughter Mary was his godchild. He had another goddaughter, Margaret Bowlby, daughter of Henry Bowlby, headmaster of Lancing College. His closest friend was his contemporary, the English classical scholar Evelyn Abbott, with whom he spent most of his vacations.

== Death and legacy ==
Strachan-Davidson died on 28 March 1916 due to cerebral hemorrhage caused by atherosclerosis and was buried in Holywell Cemetery in Oxford. A bronze tablet was placed in Balliol Chapel in his commemoration.

He had acquired around 1500 to 1600 Greek and Roman coins during his many visits to Egypt, Italy, and Sicily. They mainly dated to the Macedonian, Ptolemaic, and Imperial Roman periods. This collection was bequeathed to Balliol College upon his death, and then given to Ashmolean Museum as per his wishes.

== Selected works ==
=== Books ===
- Selections from Polybius (Oxford: Clarendon Press, 1888)
- Cicero and the Fall of the Roman Republic (New York: Putnam, 1894)
- Appian's Civil Wars, Book I (Oxford: Clarendon, 1902)
- Problems of the Roman Criminal Law, 2 vols. (Oxford: Clarendon Press, 1912)

=== Articles ===
- "The Growth of Plebeian Privilege at Rome", The English Historical Review, Vol. 1, No. 2 (1886)
- "The Decrees of the Roman Plebs", The English Historical Review, Vol. 5, No. 19 (1890)
- "Mommsen's Roman Criminal Law", The English Historical Review, Vol. 16, No. 62 (1901)
- "Ancient Imperialism – II. Roman Republic", The Classical Review, Vol. 24, No. 4 (1910)

Academic offices
Preceded by Edward Caird	Master of Balliol College, Oxford; 1907–1916	Succeeded by Arthur Lionel Smith
