= William O'Connor Morris =

Irish judge and historian

- Born: 26 November 1824; Kilkenny, Ireland
- Died: 3 August 1904 (aged 79)
- Occupations: County court judge; historian

William O'Connor Morris (26 November 1824 – 3 August 1904) was an Irish county court judge and historian.

== Education and career ==
Morris was educated at Epsom College in Surrey and a school at Laugharne in Wales, before matriculating in 1843 at Oriel College, Oxford. He graduated there in 1848 after a leave of absence of a year and a half in 1846–1847 due to his family's financial difficulties connected with the Great Famine. Three years after leaving Oxford, he entered the King's Inns in Dublin as a law student. He was admitted to Lincoln's Inn in 1852 and was called to the Irish bar in 1854. He became a professor of common and criminal law in the King's Inns in 1862. In 1863 he was appointed Special Commissioner of Irish Fisheries but was compelled to resign due to a differing opinion with Sir Robert Peel.

Morris married in 1858 and through his wife's inheritance became owner of the Gartnamona estate. Morris, an acquaintance of Henry Reeve, contributed articles on history and other subjects to the Edinburgh Review and, less often, to the English Historical Review. He also reviewed books on military history for The Times. As a landlord he was keenly interested in land tenure in Ireland, and the Landlord and Tenant (Ireland) Act 1870 incorporated many of his ideas. He was appointed a county court judge for County Louth in 1872 and after six years was transferred to County Kerry. At his own request he was transferred in 1886 to the county judgeship of the united counties of Sligo and Roscommon and thereafter devoted most of his efforts to literary work.

== Personal life ==
He married Georgiana Kathleen Lindsay on 16 March 1858; the marriage produced five daughters and one son.

== Selected publications ==
- Letters on the land question of Ireland. 1870.
- The French revolution and first empire: an historical sketch. 1874.
- Great commanders of modern times and The campaigns of 1815. 1891.
- Moltke: a biographical and critical study. 1893.
- Memories and thoughts of a life. 1895. (autobiography)
- Napoleon, warrior and ruler, and the military supremacy of revolutionary France. Heroes of the Nations. 1896.
- Ireland, 1494–1868. 1896.
- Hannibal, soldier, statesman, patriot; and the crisis of struggle between Carthage and Rome. Heroes of the Nations. 1897.
- The great campaigns of Nelson. 1898.
- Ireland, 1798–1898. 1898.
- The campaign of 1815. 1900.
- Present Irish questions. 1901.
- Memoirs of Gerald O'Connor of the princely house of the O'Connors of Offaly in the kingdom of Ireland. 1903.
- Wellington, soldier and statesman, and the revival of the military power of England. Heroes of the Nations. 1904.

== Arms ==
Coat of arms of William O'Connor Morris

Notes
Confirmed 18 December 1897 by Sir Arthur Edward Vicars, Ulster King of Arms.
Crest
On a wreath of the colours on a Roman fasces Proper a man's head affrontee couped below the shoulders all Proper.
Escutcheon
Quarterly 1st & 4th Gules two swords points upwards in saltire Argent pommels and hilts Or between as many garbs in pale of the last banded Sable (Morris) 2nd Argent an oak tree eradicated Proper (O'Connor) 3rd Sable a beud Argent in the sinister chief a tower triple-towered of the second (Plunkett).
Motto
Festina Lente
