= Evelyn Shirley Shuckburgh =

English classical scholar and translator (1843–1906)

Evelyn Shirley Shuckburgh (12 July 1843 – 10 July 1906) was an English academic and schoolmaster, known as a classical scholar and translator.

== Life ==
Born at Aldborough, Norfolk on 12 July 1843, he was the third and eldest surviving son in the family of twelve children of Robert Shuckburgh, rector of the parish, by his wife Elizabeth (died 1876), daughter of Dr. Lyford of Winchester. He was educated for some time at a preparatory school kept at Winchester by the Rev. E. Huntingford; then he went to Ipswich School, under Hubert Ashton Holden, whose teaching Shuckburgh enjoyed. His father died in 1860, and in 1862 Shuckburgh entered Emmanuel College, Cambridge as an exhibitioner. He was president of the Cambridge Union in 1865, and graduated in the classical tripos of 1866.

From 1866 to 1874 Shuckburgh was a fellow and assistant tutor of Emmanuel College. In the latter year, having vacated his fellowship by his marriage, he became an assistant master at Eton College. There he remained for ten years, when he returned to Cambridge. He was appointed librarian of Emmanuel College, and concentrated on his teaching and writing.

Later Shuckburgh undertook examining in universities and public schools. In 1901 he was appointed by the Intermediate Education Board for Ireland to report on secondary education in Irish schools. He died suddenly on 10 July 1906, in the train between Berwick and Edinburgh, while on his way to examine at St. Leonard's School, St. Andrews, and was buried at Grantchester, where for some years he had lived.

== Family ==
Shuckburgh married Frances Mary, daughter of the Rev. Joseph Pullen, formerly fellow and tutor of Corpus Christi College, Cambridge, and Gresham professor of astronomy. He left a family of two sons and three daughters; the sons were John Evelyn Shuckburgh, a civil servant, and Robert Shirley Shuckburgh, of the Public Trustee Office.

== Works ==
Shuckburgh wrote with facility.

=== Translations ===
Immediately after his degree, Shuckburgh published anonymously translations of classical works, intended for university examinations. He later undertook the editing of many volumes of elementary school classics, mostly for Messrs. Macmillan and the Cambridge University Press. These books were typically compilations. Sir Richard Jebb asked him adapt his edition of Sophocles for use in schools; however, he lived only to publish the Œdipus Coloneus, Antigone, and Philoctetes.

In 1889 Shuckburgh made a complete translation of Polybius, and then a translation of Cicero's letters in Messrs. Bell's series (1899-1900). With his edition of Suetonius's Life of Augustus (Cambridge University Press, 1896), he added to scholarship, and the work obtained for him the Cambridge degree of Litt.D. in 1902.

=== History ===
The Life of Augustus (1903) gives Shuckburgh's own views of Augustus and his age. A General History of Rome to the Battle of Actium appeared in 1894. In 1901 Shuckburgh produced for the University Press A Short History of the Greeks from the Earliest Times to BC 146, and in 1905, for the Story of the Nations series, Greece from the Coming of the Hellenes to AD 14.

Towards the history of Emmanuel College, Shuckburgh wrote a number of works:

- the account (anonymously published) of the Commemoration of the Three Hundredth Anniversary of Emmanuel College (1884);
- Lawrence Chaderton (First Master of Emmanuel College), translated from a Latin Memoir of Dr. Dillingham and Richard Farmer (Master of Emmanuel 1775-1797). An Essay (1884);
- Two Biographies of William Bedell, Bishop of Kilmore, with a Selection of his Letters and an unpublished Treatise (1902); and
- the History of Emmanuel College in Robinson's series of College Histories (1904).

=== Other works ===
Shuckburgh edited in 1889, with an introduction, The A.B.C. both in Latyn and Englishe, being a facsimile reprint of the earliest extant English Reading Book, and in 1891 Philip Sidney's Apologie for Poetrie from the text of 1595. He also published from a manuscript in the library of Emmanuel College The Soul and the Body, a Mediæval Greek Poem (1894). He contributed essays and occasional verses to literary journals. He wrote for the Edinburgh Review on the correspondence of Cicero (January 1901), and for the Dictionary of National Biography.
