= Henri Jean Baptiste Anatole Leroy-Beaulieu =

French publicist and historian

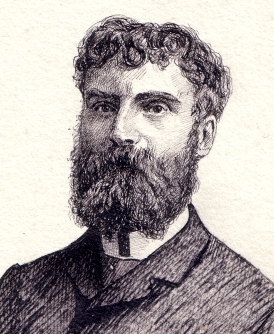
Henri Jean Baptiste Anatole Leroy-Beaulieu.

Henri Jean Baptiste Anatole Leroy-Beaulieu (French: [ɑ̃ʁi ʒɑ̃ batist anatɔl ləʁwa boljø]; February 12, 1842 – June 16, 1912) was a French publicist and historian born in Lisieux, Calvados. He specialized in writing about the history of Russia.

== Biography ==
In 1866, Leroy-Beaulieu published Une troupe de comédiens, and afterwards Essai sur la restoration de nos monuments historiques devant l'art et devant le budget, which deals particularly with the restoration of the cathedral of Évreux. He visited Russia in order to collect documents on the political and economic organization of the Slavic nations, and on his return published in the Revue des deux mondes (1882–1889) a series of articles, which appeared shortly afterwards in book form under the title L'Empire des tsars et les Russes (4th ed., revised in 3 vols., 1897–1898). The work entitled Un empereur, un roi, un pope, une restauration, published in 1879, was an analysis and criticism of the politics of the Second French Empire. Un homme d'état russe (1884) gave the history of the emancipation of the serfs by Alexander II.

Other works are Les Catholiques libéraux, l'église et la libéralisme (1890), La Papauté, le socialisme at la démocracie (1892), Les Juifs et l'Antisémitisme; Israël chez les Nations (1893), Les Arméniens et la question arménienne (1896), L'Antisémitisme (1897), Etudes russes et européennes (1897). These writings, mainly collections of articles and lectures intended for the general public, display enlightened views and wide information.

In 1881 Leroy-Beaulieu was elected professor of contemporary history and eastern affairs at the École Libre des Sciences Politiques, becoming director of this institution on the death of Albert Sorel in 1906, and in 1887 he became a member of the Académie des Sciences Morales et Politiques.

He died in 1912 in Paris.

His brother, Pierre Paul Leroy-Beaulieu (1843–1916), was a notable French economist.

== Works ==
Leroy-Beaulieu's works that have been translated into English include:

- Doctrines of Hatred, Part II: Anti-Protestantism, by Richard Robinson (2025) (From Les Doctrines de haine, l’antisémitisme, l’antiprotestantisme, l’anticléricalisme, Paris, Calmann-Lévy, 1902)
- Doctrines of Hatred, Part I: Anti-Semitism, by Richard Robinson (2023) (From Les Doctrines de haine, l’antisémitisme, l’antiprotestantisme, l’anticléricalisme, Paris, Calmann-Lévy, 1902)
- Empire of the Tsars and the Russians, by Zénaïde Alexeïevna Ragozin (New York City, 1893–1896)
- Israel among the Nations: A Study of the Jews and Antisemitism, by F. Hellman (1895)
- Jewish Immigrants in Early 1900s America, by S. Capsuto (2016)
- Papacy, Socialism, Democracy, by B. L. O'Donnell (1892)

Also see W. E. H. Lecky, Historical and Political Essays (1908).

== Sources ==
- Georges Goyau (1913). "Anatole Leroy-Beaulieu" . In Herbermann, Charles (ed.). Catholic Encyclopedia. New York: Robert Appleton Company.
- Anatole Leroy-Beaulieu, Frances Hellman (1895). Israel Among the Nations. G. P. Putnam's sons.
