= Evelyn Shuckburgh =

British diplomat

Sir Charles Arthur Evelyn Shuckburgh, GCMG, CB (26 May 1909 – 12 December 1994), better known as Sir Evelyn Shuckburgh, was a British diplomat. In the 1950s he was at the heart of affairs in London, as Principal Private Secretary to the Foreign Secretary, Anthony Eden, and from 1954 to 1956 as Assistant Under-Secretary at the Foreign Office in charge of Middle East affairs.

== Family and education ==
He was the son of Sir John Evelyn Shuckburgh, an under-secretary at the Colonial Office, and was educated at Winchester and King's College, Cambridge.

== Professional career ==
Shuckburgh entered the Diplomatic Service in 1933, spending his early years in Egypt, Canada, Argentina and Czechoslovakia. In Egypt, during the years preceding the Second World War, he was for a time Private Secretary to Sir Miles Lampson, the British Ambassador to Egypt. He served as chargé d'affaires in Argentina in 1944.

Shuckburgh returned to the Foreign Office in 1947. After heading up three successive regional departments, he was recommended in 1951 for the post of Private Secretary to the Secretary of State for Foreign Affairs; Ernest Bevin had retired in March of that year, to be succeeded by Herbert Morrison for a seven-month period, followed by Anthony Eden when the Conservative Party took power that autumn. In the succeeding three years Eden and Shuckburgh were involved in the post-war reorganisation of Western Europe which led up to the creation of the Common Market, in negotiations in Korea and Indochina, and in making an agreement with Egypt over the withdrawal of British forces from the Suez Canal Zone.

After a period at the Imperial Defence College, Shuckburgh served at the headquarters of NATO in Paris, in 1958, as Assistant Secretary-General. He was British Permanent Representative to the North Atlantic Council from 1962 to 1966. He spoke Italian fluently and his final posting was as Ambassador to Italy from 1966 to 1969.

== Later life ==
After retiring in 1969, Shuckburgh returned to Britain and lived in the Chilterns. During the 1970s he chaired his local committee for the National Trust. He also worked for the British Red Cross; he was Chairman of both its executive committee and its council.

In 1986 the diaries he wrote during the Suez Crisis were published, titled Descent to Suez: Diaries 1951-56 and selected by John Charmley.

Shuckburgh died on 12 December 1994 in Watlington, Oxfordshire.

== Personal life ==
On 25 September 1937, Shuckburgh married Nancy Mildred Gladys Brett, daughter of The 3rd Viscount Esher. They had a daughter, Catherine (born 1939), and two sons, Julian John Evelyn (30 July 1940 - 23 September 2021) and Robin Anthony (born 1948).

== Honours ==
Shuckburgh was appointed a Order of Saint Michael and Saint George (CMG) in the 1949 Birthday Honours, and a Order of the Bath (CB) in the 1954 New Year Honours. He was promoted to Knight Commander of the Order of St Michael and St George (KCMG) in the 1959 New Year Honours, and then to Knight Grand Cross of that Order (GCMG) in the 1967 Birthday Honours.

== Archives ==
Shuckburgh's papers, including personal diaries and letters, are held at the Cadbury Research Library (University of Birmingham).

Diplomatic posts
Preceded by Sir Roderick Barclay	Principal Private Secretary to the Foreign Secretary; 1951–1954	Succeeded by Sir Anthony Rumbold
Preceded by Sir Paul Mason	British Permanent Representative on the North Atlantic Council; 1962–1966	Succeeded by Sir Bernard Burrows
Preceded by Sir John Guthrie Ward	British Ambassador to Italy; 1966–1969	Succeeded by Sir Patrick Hancock
