= Zénaïde Alexeïevna Ragozin =

Russian-American writer (1834–1924)

- Зинаида Алексеевна Рагозина
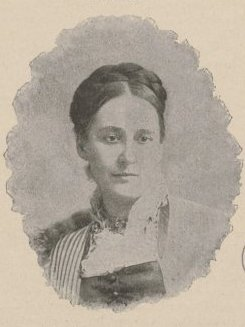
- Born: 1834; Ryazan Governorate, Russian Empire
- Died: 18.05.1924; Leningrad, USSR
- Spouse: Vasily Kelsiyev
- Writing career
- Language: Russian, English

Zénaïde Alexeïevna Ragoz(in)a (1834 - 1924) - famous Russian (Ukrainian) and American author, researcher, philosoph, scientist, writer, researcher of Ukrainian, Cossack origin.

== Biography ==
She was born and educated in Imperial Russia in the Family with Cossack roots from the lands of historical Cossack Kingdom, modern Ukraine.

She had no regular education, but studied by herself. After traveling widely for several years in Europe, in 1874 she emigrated to the United States. She was a member of the American Oriental Society, of the Société Ethnologique and Athénée Oriental, of Paris, and the Victoria Institute, London.

== Works ==
In the Story of the Nations series:

- The Story of Chaldea (1886)
- The Story of Assyria (1887)
- The Story of Media, Babylon, and Persia (1888)
- The Story of Vedic India (1895)

She did five volumes of biography for the "Tales of the Heroic Ages" series. Among them were:

- Siegfried, the Hero of the Netherlands (1898)
- Roland, the Paladin of France (1899)
- Salammbo, the Maid of Carthage (1899)

She wrote A History of the World, Earliest Peoples, and A History of the World, Early Egypt and translated from the French Anatole Leroy-Beaulieu's The Empire of the Tsars and the Russians. She also wrote numerous articles for Russian and American magazines.

Her personal copy of A History of the World, Earliest Peoples, ed 1899 contains the following autograph: "This is the work I love best & think will prove of real benefit. It is also by far the most difficult I have ever planned & undertaken. There is only one thing about it that troubles me: it is that, in the course of nature, I cannot live to do the whole of it, & I am anything but sure that whoever will take it up where I leave it, will fully grasp and carry out my idea. If I could devote the rest of my life to it, I might accomplish the whole, down to the French Revolution. But as it brings me no return, and will not for years, I am compelled to do it, so to speak by stealth, in the hours that I can spare from bread & butter work. One cannot help, at times, regretting the ages of "patrons of letters & sciences." signed, Z A Ragozin.
