= Kura rebellion =

1921 conflict in Transjordan

Date	1921–1923
Location	District of Kura, Emirate of Transjordan
Result	Transjordanian government victory

Belligerents
Sheikh Kulaib's militia	(Kingdom of Hejaz) Transjordan; United Kingdom

Commanders and leaders
Sheikh Kulaib al-Shraideh	(Kingdom of Hejaz) Emir Abdullah (United Kingdom) Frederick Peake

Strength
Unknown	Emir Abdullah's forces British RAF

Casualties and losses
Unknown	15+ (1921 offensive)
- Unknown

The Kura rebellion in Transjordan, April 1921, was instigated when Sheikh Kulaib al-Shraideh, a self-established ruler of the district of Kura, refused to surrender his autonomy to the adjacent district of Irbid. Shraideh's motivations included personal hatred towards Ali Khulki Al-Sharayri, one of Emir Abdullah's ministers, who was head of the Irbid district. Shraideh demanded that the Kura be designated a separate entity, severed from Irbid, and answerable separately to Amman.

The Amman central government refused such arrangement as it would have paved the way for more similar demands from other ambitious tribal leaders. The central government sent tax collectors to Kura but one of them was killed. The collectors withdrew to Irbid and returned with an armed force that was ambushed, killing no less than fifteen and imprisoning several others. Abdullah, realizing the nascent central government's weakness, went to Kura personally. Shraideh was flattered, and declared his submission upon the Emir's arrival. In return, Abdullah announced an amnesty for the rebels, and the Emir reshuffled the cabinet to remove Sharayri, which added to Shraideh's satisfaction.

== Background ==
In 1920, sheikh Kulaib al-Shurayda had established himself as an autonomous rural potentate with French support and encouragement from Damascus. When the first central government was organized in Amman in April 1921, and the Kura was declared a part of the administrative region of Irbid, Kulayb refused to accept such arrangement. One reason for this was the personal feud between sheikh Kulayb and Ali Khulqi al-Sharayiri, the head of the government of Ajlun in Irbid, who has meanwhile become a minister in Amman, in charge of security. Kulayb got a strong support from local villagers, asking Kura to be separated from Irbid and established as an administrative district of its own, directly under Amman's governorship.^

== 1921 revolt and amnesty ==
The recently organized central government of Transjordan could not accept Kulayb's demands, which could have resulted in similar demands from other sheikhs, and badly needed money, meaning immediate need of tax collection. As a result, tax collectors were sent to Kura, escorted by a contingent of local gendarmerie. Though they had eventually arrived to Kura, the deputy commanding officer of the force was killed by local villagers, and the tax collectors retreated to Irbid. Fuad Slim, commander of the cavalry, was ordered to advance against the rebels and find the responsible for the killing. However, alerted people of Kura caught the attacking force in an ambush and defeated them. Fifteen of the attacking force were killed and many, including Fuad Slim himself, taken prisoners.

Unable to reduce Kulayb by force, the government of Transjordan offered negotiations. The government was refused to reach a surrender of Kura rebels, responsible for killing, and it was finally decided to close the feud by tribal custom of returning government forces' horses and arms and pay a diyyah (blood money, or reparations) to the relatives of the killed government men. Even this arrangement did not work, and emir Abdullah decided to resort to personal diplomacy and arrive to Kura himself. Flattered by the "respect" of emir's personal visit, the leader of Kura rebellion, sheikh Kulayb, hastened to meet him upon arrival and declared his surrender and submission. In return, the sheikh and his men were granted a general amnesty. About the same time Ali Khulqi al-Sharayiri was removed from cabinet after a government reshuffle - a matter which added to sheikh Kulayb's satisfaction. The scandalous failure of the central government to suppress the Kura rebellion encouraged similar rebellions in other areas, which made the tax collection impossible in many parts of the country.

== 1923 revolt ==
In 1923, sheikh Kulayb al-Shurayda of Kura district renewed his rebel activities, and prompted a strong response by the British. His stronghold in Tibna was bombed by the RAF and captain Frederick Peake led a newly organized reserve force of 750 men in an all-out attack on the district. Unable to further resist, the sheikh fled to seek refuge in Balqa, while a number of his men were caught and brought to trial.

== Aftermath ==
On May 25, 1923 Britain formally announced the self-government of Transjordan under emir Abdullah, and the emir issued a general pardon for the Kura rebels in honor of this occasion.

With the end of the Kura affair, another trouble began to loom as the feud between Bani Sakhr, headed by Mithqal Al-Fayez – especially favored by Emir Abdullah, and Adwan bedouins of Balqa, headed by Sultan al-Adwan. Dangerously exposed to the Wahhabi raids from Arabia, Emir Abdullah had not intention to alienate Sultan al-Adwan, even if he did pay a special attention to Banu Sakhr, since they protected the nascent state from the Wahhabi raids. After unsuccessful pacification attempts Sultan al-Adwan decided to strike first. He advanced on Amman in a full force, and occupied two gendarmerie outposts, at the western entrances to the capital. Adwan's forces were defeated in a fierce battle and put to flight.

Some tribal unrest continued to simmer in the country for a few years after the suppression of Adwan insurrection. In 1926, the government had to send a force to suppress a rebellion in Wadi Musa, where the villagers refused to pay taxes and seized and looted the local gendarmerie post and government house.

== See also ==
- History of Jordan
- List of modern conflicts in the Middle East
- Tibna, Jordan, seat of Sheikh Kulaib al-Shraideh in the Kura
