= Ikhwan raids on Transjordan =

1922–1924 armed conflict in the Middle East

- Part of the Formation of Saudi Arabia
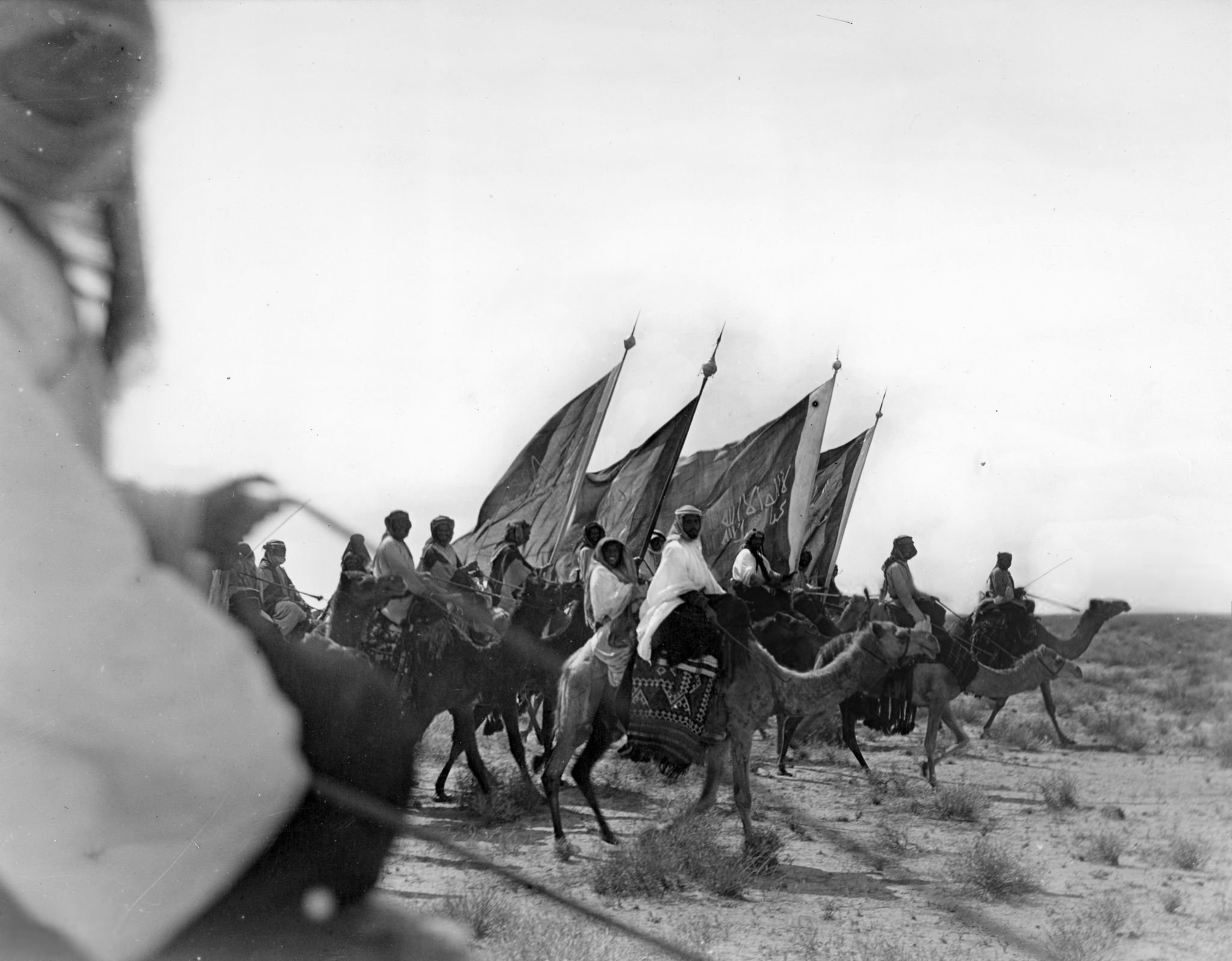
- Ikhwan on the move
Date	1922–1924
Location	Emirate of Transjordan
Result	Transjordanian victory; Uqair Protocol of 1922
Territorial changes	Transjordan retrieves Al-Jawf, Wadi Sirhan and Kaf from Sultanate of Nejd

Belligerents
Ikhwan: 'Utaybah; Mutayr	Transjordan: Bani Sakher; Adwan; Ajarma; Abbad; Bani Hasan; Bani Hamaida; Hadid; Minor Support: United Kingdom: Royal Air Force

Commanders and leaders
(Ikhwan) Eqab bin Mohaya (Ikhwan) Faisal al-Duwaish (surrendered)	(Emirate of Transjordan) Abdullah I (Emirate of Transjordan) Minwer Shtewi Al-Hadid † (Emirate of Transjordan) Sheikh Mithqal Al Fayez (Emirate of Transjordan) Haditha Al-Khraisha

Strength
1,500-2,000 raiders (1922); 3,000–4,000 or 4,500 camel raiders	Unknown

Casualties and losses
500-7000 killed (1924); 600 captured (1924)	130 tribesmen killed or wounded (1924)
- Population of two small villages massacred (1922); According to reports, out of about two thousand Ikhwan fighters who raided Transjordan in 1922, no more than eight made it back alive after being intercepted and bombed by the British aircraft Total killed: ~1,500

The Ikhwan raids on Transjordan were a series of attacks by the Ikhwan, irregular Arab tribesmen of Najd, on the Emirate of Transjordan between 1922 and 1924. The repeated Wahhabi incursions from Najd into southern parts of his territory were the most serious threat to Emir Abdullah I's position in Transjordan. The emir was powerless to repel these raids by himself, thus the British maintained a military base, with a small air force, at Marka, close to Amman. The British military force was the primary obstacle against the Ikhwan, and ultimately helped Abdullah to secure his rule over Transjordan.

== Ikhwan raid on Amarah ==
With the defeat of the Hashemites in the Nejd–Hejaz War of 1919, and a failure to establish a Hashemite domain over the region of Syria, the British hoped to secure Transjordan and Iraq as Hashemite kingdoms, and did put a significant effort into securing them from external and internal threats. The military assistance of the British to Emir Abdullah I of Jordan helped to suppress a local rebellion at Kura and a later rebellion by Sultan Adwan in 1921 and 1923, respectively. They also played a crucial role in the major invasions by the Wahhabi tribesmen of Najd (the Ikhwan). While Transjordan experienced internal stability during 1922–1923, a new external threat emerged from the southeast of the country. The Wahhabi Ikhwan movement, supported by King Ibn Saud as a tool of territorial expansion, advanced northwards and westwards and arrived at the undemarcated borders of Transjordan in the summer of 1922. The Ikhwan were a cross-tribal striking force, whose religious fervour combined with the support of the King proved too strong a military challenge for the Arabian tribes. The Wahhabi threat brought forward a merger of interests between the nomadic tribes within Transjordan and the Transjordanian government, and for the first time since its establishment the latter was in a more balanced position vis-à-vis these tribes.

== First major raid ==
The Ikhwan initiated their first attack on Transjordan by massacring the inhabitants of two villages belonging to the tribe of Bani Sakhr, approximately 12 miles south of Amman. In a two-day battle, the tribesmen of the Hadid tribe alongside the remnants of the Bani Sakhr managed to defeat the raiders. The raiders were intercepted by British armored cars and planes only after they had begun to withdraw.

== Second major raid ==
In August 1924, a larger Ikhwan militia force, numbering some 4,500 raiders, travelled 1,600 kilometers from Najd (in modern-day Saudi Arabia) to attack Transjordan, a British protectorate. Fifteen kilometers south of Amman, the raiders engaged again with the villages of the Bani Sakhr, but were attacked by the British Royal Air Force (RAF). The Ikhwan army suffered heavy casualties, with the death toll reaching 500. The raided villages suffered 130 dead.

Second major raid
- Part of Ikhwan raids on Transjordan
Location	Transjordan
Result	Transjordanian victory

Belligerents
Transjordan Support: United Kingdom	Ikhwan

Casualties and losses
Unknown	500~ killed
- 130 dead Buildings destroyed

== Aftermath ==
Other Ikhwan raids occurred during the 1927–1930 Ikhwan Revolt against the authority of Ibn Saud. The Ikhwanis raided southern Iraq in November 1927 and Kuwait in January 1928, in which they stole camels and sheep. On both occasions, though they raided brutally, they suffered heavy retaliations from the RAF and Kuwaitis. The Ikhwan were eventually defeated by Ibn Saud's regular forces and their leadership slain. The remnants were incorporated into regular Saudi units.

== See also ==
- Sultan bin Najad
- Kuwait-Najd Border War
- Uqair Protocol of 1922
- Saudi Arabian National Guard
- List of modern conflicts in the Middle East
- List of wars involving Saudi Arabia
