= Lewis Sergeant =

Lewis Sergeant (1841–1902) was an English journalist and author.

== Life ==
The son of John Sergeant, a schoolmaster at Cheltenham School, and his wife Mary Anne, daughter of George Lewis, he was born at Barrow-on-Humber, Lincolnshire, on 10 November 1841. Adeline Sergeant was his first cousin, the daughter of Richard Sergeant, his father's brother.

After education under a private tutor, Sergeant matriculated at St Catharine's College, Cambridge, in 1861, graduating B.A. with mathematical honours in 1865. At the Cambridge Union he showed himself a Liberal and supporter of W. E. Gladstone. On leaving college, he spent a period as assistant master under Henry Hayman at Cheltenham grammar school.

Lewis then moved into journalism, becoming editor, in succession, of An anti-Game Law Journal, of The Examiner, and the Hereford Times. He then had a long period with The Athenæum and with the London Daily Chronicle as lead writer. He was also a recognised authority on education, was elected to the council of the College of Preceptors, and edited the Educational Times from 1895 to 1902.

A Hellenophile, from 1878 Sergeant acted as secretary of the Greek committee in London. George I of Greece bestowed on him the Order of the Redeemer in October 1878.

Sergeant died at Bournemouth on 3 February 1902.

== Works ==
Sergeant's historical writings cover a wide range, and included:

- England's Policy: its Traditions and Problems, Edinburgh, 1881.
- William Pitt, in the "English Political Leaders" series, 1882.
- John Wyclif, in the "Heroes of the Nations" series, 1893.
- The Franks in the "Story of the Nations" series, 1898.

Sergeant published New Greece (1878, republished 1879), and Greece in 1880. There followed Greece in the Nineteenth Century: a Record of Hellenic Emancipation and Progress, 1821–1897, with illustrations, in 1897. He also wrote a volume of verse; a novel, The Caprice of Julia (1898); and other fiction pseudonymously.

== Family ==
Sergeant married on 12 April 1871 Emma Louisa, daughter of James Robertson of Cheltenham. Philip Walsingham Sergeant, the author, was one of their children.

== Notes ==
Attribution

This article incorporates text from a publication now in the public domain: Lee, Sidney, ed. (1912). "Sergeant, Lewis". Dictionary of National Biography (2nd supplement). Vol. 3. London: Smith, Elder & Co.
