= Frederick Peake =

British Army officer and police officer (1886–1970)

Major-General Frederick Peake CMG CBE CStJ
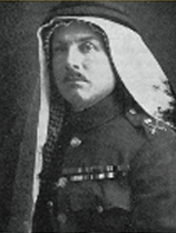
- Peake wearing traditional Jordanian Keffiyeh
- Born: 12 June 1886; Epsom, England
- Died: 30 March 1970 (aged 83); Kelso, Scotland
- Military career
- Allegiance: United Kingdom
- Branch: British Army
- Service years: 1906–1939
- Rank: Major-General
- Nickname: Peake Pasha
- Units: Imperial Camel Corps; Royal Flying Corps; Sudan Camel Corps; Duke of Wellington's Regiment
- Commands: Arab Legion
- Conflicts: First World War
- Awards: Companion of the Order of St Michael and St George; Commander of the Order of the British Empire; Commander of the Venerable Order of Saint John; Officer of the Order of the Nile (Egypt); Order of Istiqlal (Jordan)
- Other work: Policeman, author

Major-General Frederick Gerard Peake, CMG, CBE, CStJ (12 June 1886 – 30 March 1970), known as Peake Pasha, was a British Army and police officer and creator of the Arab Legion.

== Military career ==
The son of Lieutenant Colonel Walter Peake, of Melton Mowbray, Peake was born at Epsom on 12 June 1886. He attended Stubbington House School, Fareham, and graduated from the Royal Military College, Sandhurst in 1906, being commissioned into the Duke of Wellington's Regiment. He served in India from 1908 to 1913.

During the First World War, Peake served with the Royal Flying Corps in Salonica, and was also an officer serving with the Imperial Camel Corps, part of the British Imperial Egyptian Army, seeing action in the Darfur Expedition. In 1917 he was awarded the Order of the Nile, Fourth Class. He served for a time under Lawrence of Arabia.

In September 1920 Peake, then a captain, left the Imperial Camel Corps to report on the security situation in Transjordan. Security was found to be inadequate, and in October the same year Peake, by then promoted to lieutenant colonel, was ordered by the High Commissioner of Palestine to form two small police forces:

1. The Mobile Force, 100 men to guard the Palestine–Amman road.
2. 50 men to support the British District Officer posted to Al Karak, east of the Dead Sea.

During the summers of 1921 and 1923, Peake organised the 150-man Reserve Mobile Force, which formed the nucleus of the Arab Legion. This force was made up of Arabs, Kurds, Turks, Chechens and Circassians, armed with German rifles. Due to increasing regional skirmishes, the Reserve Mobile Force was increased in strength to 750 officers and men. This reorganised force thwarted Wahhabi raids in 1922 and the Adwan Rebellion in 1923. Peake became a major general in the army of the Emirate of Transjordan.

== Private life ==
In 1937, Peake married Elspeth MacLean Ritchie, younger daughter of Norman Ritchie, of St Boswells, and they had one daughter. In 1939, he retired and was succeeded by John Bagot Glubb. To the Jordanians he became known as "Peake Pasha".

In retirement, Peake settled at Hawkslee, St Boswells, Roxburghshire, his wife's home village. She died in 1967. His daughter, Julia Grace Peake, was born in 1941. She married firstly David Renwick Grant, and secondly Sir Hugh Arbuthnot, 7th Baronet.

== Selected publications ==
- Peake, F. (1934). A history of Trans-Jordan and its tribes. Vol. 1. Amman.
- Peake, F. (1934). A history of Trans-Jordan and its tribes. Vol. 2. Amman.
- A History of Jordan and its Tribes, University of Miami Press, 1958
- Change at St Boswells (the story of a border village), John McQueen and Son, 1961
- Arab Command. The Biography of Lieutenant-Colonel F. G. Peake Pasha C.M.G., C.B.E., Hutchinson & Co., 1942
