= Benedikt Willert =

German footballer

Personal information
- Date of birth: 2 June 2001 (age 25)
- Place of birth: Forchheim, Germany
- Height: 1.90 m (6 ft 3 in)
- Position: Goalkeeper

Youth career
- 2006–2009: DJK-SpVgg Effeltrich
- 2009–2015: FSV Erlangen-Bruck
- 2015–2019: 1. FC Nürnberg

Senior career*
Years	Team	Apps	(Gls)
2019–2022	1. FC Nürnberg II	12	(0)
2019–2020	1. FC Nürnberg	2	(0)
- * Club domestic league appearances and goals

Benedikt Willert (born 2 June 2001) is a German former professional footballer who played as a goalkeeper.

== Career ==
Willert made his professional debut for 1. FC Nürnberg in the 2. Bundesliga on 4 November 2019, starting in the away match against VfL Bochum, which ended in a 3–1 loss.
