= John Evelyn Shuckburgh =

Sir John Evelyn Shuckburgh, KCMG (born 18 March 1877 in Eton, died 8 February 1953 in London), was a British colonial administrator.

== Biography ==
Shuckburgh was the eldest son of the academic Evelyn Shirley Shuckburgh (1843–1906) and Frances Mary Pullen. His eldest son, later diplomat and Middle East expert, Sir Evelyn Shuckburgh, was born in 1909 in London.

Shuckburgh was educated at Eton and King's College, Cambridge. As a member of the British Colonial Service, Shuckburgh was active in India, and in Palestine. He was a Dickens enthusiast and was asked by Oxford University Press to write the foreword to A Tale of Two Cities.

== Governor of Nigeria ==
On 1 July 1940, John Evelyn Shuckburgh was appointed interim Governor of Nigeria; a position he held until 1942 when he was replaced by Sir Alan Burns. His tenure, as well as that of his successor, was characterised as unremarkable.
