= Charles Lethbridge Kingsford =

English historian and author

Charles Lethbridge Kingsford (25 December 1862 – 29 November 1926) was a scholarly English historian and author.

== Biography ==
Kingsford was born on 25 December (Christmas Day) 1862 in Ludlow, Shropshire, the third son of Rev. Sampson Kingsford, formerly Fellow of St. John's College, Cambridge, vicar of St Hilary, Cornwall, and at the time of Kingston's birth headmaster of Ludlow Grammar School.

Kingsford was sent to Rossall School, and went up to St John's College, Oxford, as a scholar, and obtained honours in the classical schools and in modern history. In 1888, he was awarded the Arnold prize for an essay on "The Reformation in France", and in the following year, he joined the editorial staff of the Dictionary of National Biography. In 1890, he was appointed an examiner in the Education Department, and was an assistant secretary from 1905 to 1912, when he resigned after internal reorganization made work less congenial.

During the First World War, Kingsford served as a special constable in London, for which he received the Special Constabulary Long Service Medal with clasp. He was later employed as private secretary to Sir Arthur Boscawen at the Ministry of Pensions from 1917 to 1918.

Kingsford was vice-president of the Society of Antiquaries of London, 1920–23, Ford Lecturer in British History at Oxford, 1923–24, and a vice-president of the Royal Historical Society and the London Topographical Society. In 1924 he was elected a fellow of the British Academy.

Kingsford was recognised at the time of his death "as our greatest modern authority on the history of the late 15th century". With Thomas Andrew Archer he published in 1894 a book on the Crusades (see link below), which was well received. His edition of John Stow's Survey of London in 1908 increased his reputation, which was further enhanced by his English Historical Literature in the Fifteenth Century (1913) and his Prejudice and Promise in Fifteenth Century England (1925). For the Royal Historical Society, he wrote on Sir Otho de Grandison, and for the British Society of Franciscan Studies a volume on the Grey Friars of London. His last work, which appeared at the beginning of 1926, was The Early History of Piccadilly, Leicester-square, Soho, and their Neighbourhood, which was based on a plan drawn in 1585 and published by the London Topographical Society. To the "Heroes of the Nations" series he contributed the volume on Henry V of England; he wrote the histories of the Royal Warwickshire and the Middlesex Regiments; and he edited the first volume on the manuscripts of Lord De L'Isle and Dudley in the publications of the Historical Manuscripts Commission. To these and other works he added over 400 articles to the Dictionary of National Biography, and over 30 to the Encyclopædia Britannica, besides the Camden Miscellany, the English Historical Review, Archaeologia, the Cambridge Medieval History, and the London Topographical Record.

== Death ==
Kingsford died after a sudden seizure at his home, 15 Argyll Road, Kensington, London, on Saturday, 29 November 1926, at the age of 63. He was buried at South Tawton, Devon.

Kingsford's obituary in The Times concluded: "To all his work he brought the scholarship of the true researcher, and by his patient ingenuity and insight he added materially to the sum of historical knowledge."

== Family ==
Kingsford married Alys, daughter of C. T. Hudson, LL.D., F.R.S.
