= Evelyn Abbott =

English writer and classical scholar (1843–1901)

- Born: 10 March 1843; Epperstone, England
- Died: 3 September 1901 (aged 58); Great Malvern, England
- Education: Balliol College, Oxford
- Occupations: Writer; scholar

Evelyn Abbott (/ˈæbət/; 10 March 1843 – 3 September 1901) was an English writer and classical scholar. He is best known for his book History of Greece, which includes a sceptical viewpoint of Homer's Iliad and Odyssey. He is also very well known as being the editor-in-chief of Heroes of the Nations book series, which were widely popular in England.

== Biography ==
Abbott was born at Epperstone, Nottinghamshire. He was educated at Balliol College, Oxford, where he excelled both academically and in sports, winning the Gaisford Prize for Greek Verse in 1864, but after a fall in 1866 his legs became paralysed. He managed to graduate in spite of his handicap, and was elected fellow of Balliol in 1874. His best-known work is his History of Greece in three volumes (1888–1900), where he presents a sceptical view of the Iliad and the Odyssey. Among his other works are Elements of Greek Accidence (1874), and translations of several German books on ancient history, language and philosophy. He was the founding editor of the Heroes of the Nations book series. Abbott died at Knotsford Lodge, Great Malvern, in 1901, and was buried at Redlands Cemetery, near Cardiff.

== Works ==
- The elements of Greek accidence with philological notes. 1874.
- A subject-index to the dialogues of Plato; being an index to the matters and names contained in the dialogues of Plato according to the pages of Stephens' edition. Clarendon Press. 1875. p. 64.
- Hellenica; a collection of essays on Greek poetry, philosophy, history, and religion. Rivingtons. 1880. pp. 492.
- Easy Greek reader. Oxford: Clarendon Press, 1886.
- A history of Greece. Rivingtons. 3 June 1890. (3 vols. 1888–1900)
- Pericles and the golden age of Athens. G. P. Putnam's sons. 1891. pp. 379.
- as translator: The history of antiquity. R. Bentley & Son. 3 June 1877. (6 vols. 1877–1882 from the German original Geschichte des Alterthums in 4 vols., 1852–1857, by Max Duncker)
- as translator with Sarah Frances Alleyne: Outlines of the history of Greek philosophy. Longmans. 1886. pp. 363. (from German original Die Philosophie der Griechen in ihrer geschichtlichen Entwicklung by Eduard Zeller)
- as editor with Lewis Campbell: The life and letters of Benjamin Jowett, M.A., master of Balliol College, Oxford. E. P. Dutton. 1897. p. 262.
