= Sidney Whitman =

English author

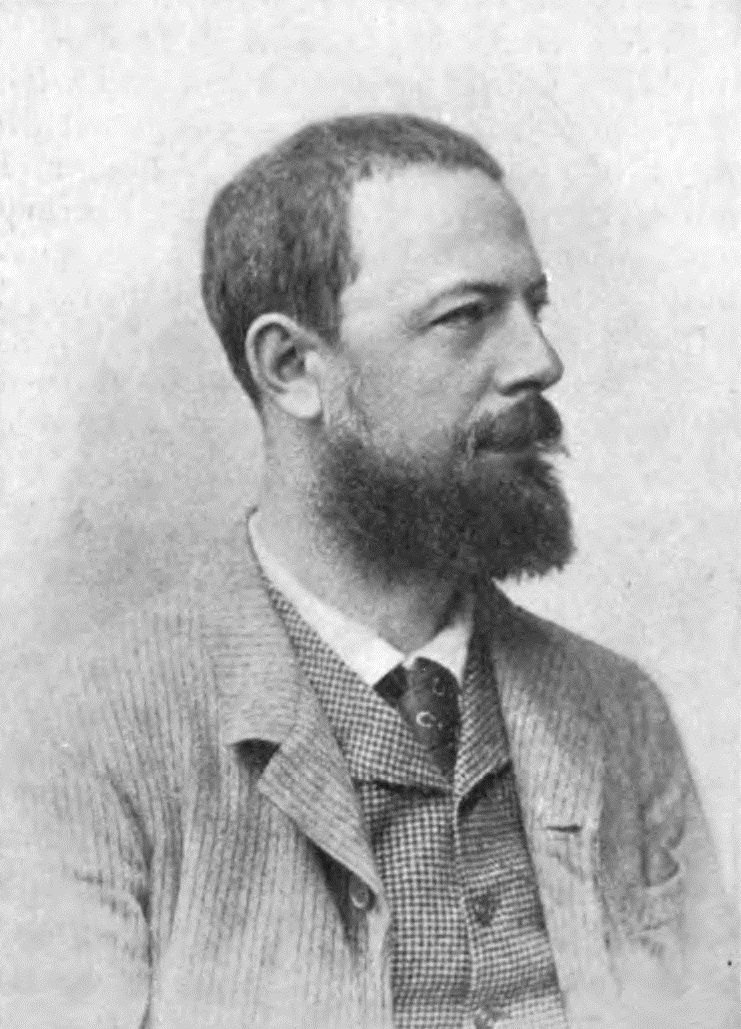

Sidney Whitman was an English author who wrote about his experiences in Russia and with the Hapsburgs. He also wrote about Turkey, Germany, and Austria. He wrote for the New York Herald for more than 20 years. The New York Times named him as "one of the greatest authors in Bismarck".

He was a Fellow of the Royal Geographical Society. His book on Turkey received a favorable review in the Illustrated London News.

== Works ==
- The Return of the Habsburgs (1893)

Imperial Germany, readable pdf

Reminiscences of the King of Roumania, readable pdf

- Prince of Bismarck, Personal Memories (1902)
- Personal Reminiscences of Prince Bismarck (1903)
- Imperial Germany; a critical study of fact and character
- Conversations with Prince Bismarck
- German Memories (1912)
- Turkish Memories (1914)
- Things I remember; the recollections of a political writer in the capitals of Europe (1916)
- Austria, Story of Nations
- Imperial Germany Chataqua Scientific and Literary Circle
