= Arthur Willert =

Former British journalist

Sir Arthur Willert KBE
- Born: 19 May 1882
- Died: 11 March 1973 (aged 90)
- Education: Eton College
- Alma mater: Balliol College, Oxford
- Occupations: Journalist, Civil servant
- Employer(s): The Times, Foreign Office, Ministry of Information
- Awards: KBE

Sir Arthur Willert, KBE (19 May 1882 – 11 March 1973) was a British journalist and public servant.

The son of Paul Ferdinand Willert, Arthur Willert was educated at Eton College and Balliol College, Oxford. Joining the staff of The Times in 1906, Willert was The Times's chief United States correspondent from 1910 to 1920, with an interruption from 1917 to 1918, when he was Secretary of the British War Mission in Washington and the representative of the Ministry of Information. He formed an extensive network of influential American contacts, which enabled him to supply the British government with valuable information concerning American politics during the First World War and to convey British views to American officials. Willert was appointed a KBE in 1919 "For valuable services rendered in connection with the War".

He became head of the News Department and Press Officer at the Foreign Office from 1921, and was a member of the United Kingdom's delegation to the Washington Naval Conference, the London Economic Conference, the London Naval Conference, the Geneva Disarmament Conference, and to meetings of the League of Nations between 1929 and 1934. He resigned from the Foreign Office in 1935 to devote his time to writing and lecturing on British foreign policy. On the outbreak of the Second World War, he became the head of the Ministry of Information Office for the Southern Region, serving until 1945.
