= James Albert Harrison =

James Albert Harrison (August 21, 1848 in Pass Christian, Mississippi – January 31, 1911 in Charlottesville, Virginia) was an American writer and educator. He was professor of Teutonic languages at the University of Virginia.

== Works ==
- George Washington: Patriot, Soldier, Statesman (1906)
