= Paul Ferdinand Willert =

Paul Ferdinand Willert (29 May 1844 – 1912) was an English author of several books and an Honorary Fellow of Exeter College, Oxford.

== Life and career ==
After education at Eton, Willert matriculated at Balliol College, Oxford, on 20 October 1862. With the aid of a scholarship, he was a scholar of Corpus Christi College, Oxford, from 1864 to 1867, graduating B.A. in 1867. In 1867 he became a fellow of Exeter College, Oxford, graduating M.A. in 1869. At Exeter College, Willert was a fellow from 1867 to 1895, a classical lecturer in 1867 and again in 1881–1882, a dean in 1877 and again in 1884, and a tutor from 1877 to 1895. He was called to the bar at the Inner Temple in 1870. He was an assistant master at Eton from 1870 to 1874. At Exeter College he was made an honorary fellow in 1903.

Upon his death, Willert was survived by his wife, a son (Sir Arthur Willert), and a daughter. He was a close friend of J. L. Strachan-Davidson and Robert Bridges.

== Selected publications ==
=== Articles ===
- "Machiavelli". The Fortnightly Review. New Series. 41 (207): 328–343. 1 March 1884.

=== Books ===
- The reign of Lewis XI. Putnam. 1876.
- Henry of Navarre and the Huguenots in France. Heroes of the nations, ed. By Evelyn Abbott. [IX]. G. P. Putnam's sons. 1893.
- A short analysis of Aristotle's Ethics. Books I. to IV. and part of X. 1894.
- Mirabeau. Macmillan & co., limited; The Macmillan company. 1898. reprint. Foreign statesmen. Macmillan and co., limited. 1913.
- Philosophy and the Revolution. 1904.
- The Radcliffe Infirmary and County Hospital and the bequest of the late Mr. Briscoe. 1909.
