= Saudi Arabia–Yemen border =

International border

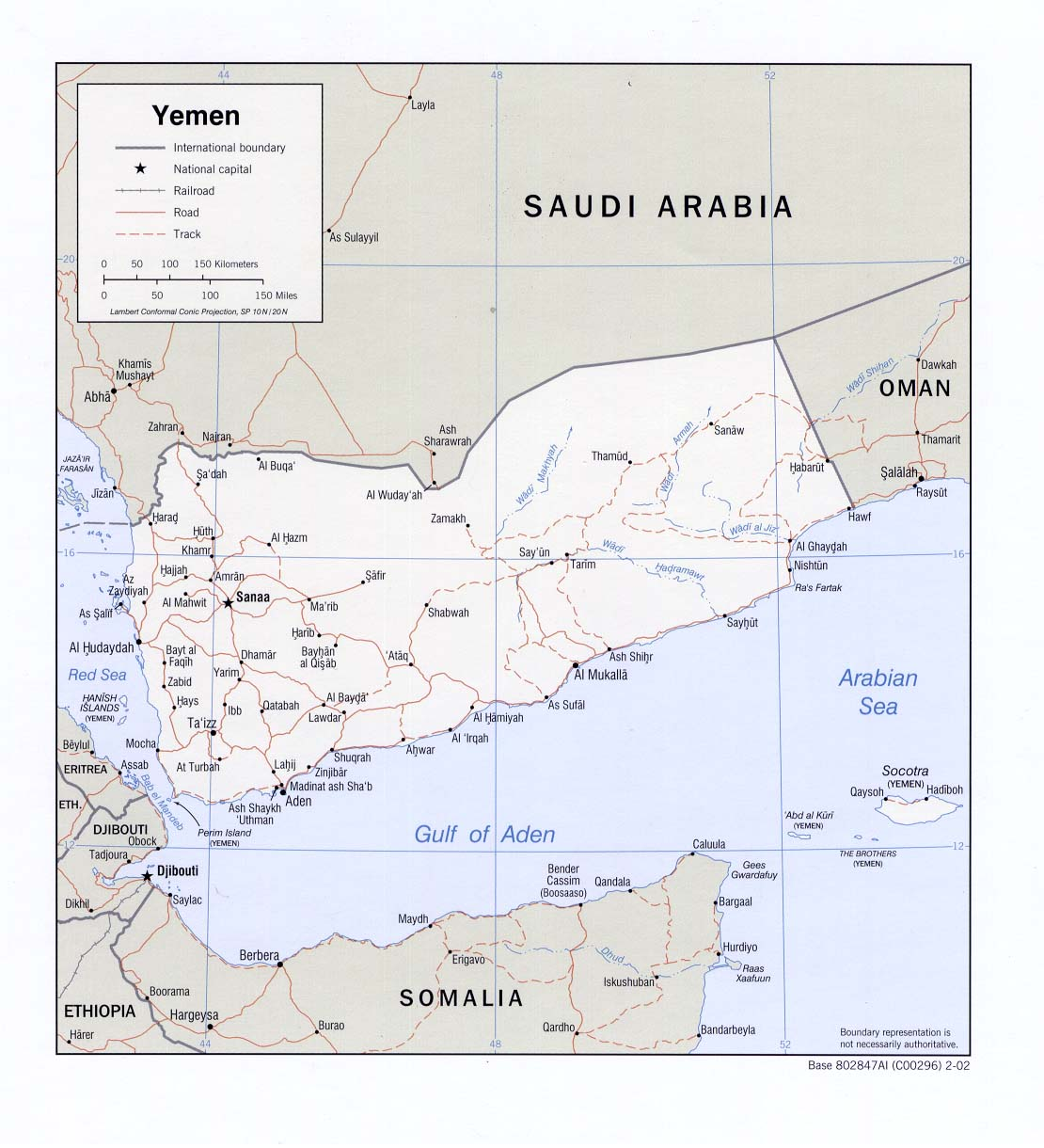
- Map of Yemen, with Saudi Arabia to the north

Characteristics
- Entities: Saudi Arabia, Yemen
- Length: 1,307 km (812 mi)

History
- Treaties: Treaty of Taif, Treaty of Jeddah (2000)

The Saudi Arabia–Yemen border is 1,307 km (812 mi) in length and runs from the Red Sea coast in the west to the tripoint with Oman in the east.

== Description ==
The border starts in the west on the Red Sea coast just north of Midi. An irregular line then proceeds to the north-east and then east to the vicinity of Al Bugal, first through a coastal plain and then through the Sarawat Mountains. A series of straight lines then proceeds eastwards through the Rub al Khali desert, dipping south so as to include Al Wadiah within Saudi Arabia, before further straight line segments proceed to the north-east and then eastwards to the Omani tripoint.

== History ==
=== Ottoman Empire era ===
Historically there was no clearly defined boundary in this part of the Arabian Peninsula; at the start of the 20th century the Ottoman Empire controlled the western coast as far south as North Yemen, Britain controlled Aden (South Yemen), with the interior consisting of loosely organised Arab groupings, occasionally forming emirates, the most prominent of which was the Emirate of Nejd and Hasa ruled by the al-Saud family. Britain and the Ottoman Empire theoretically divided their realms of influence in Arabia via the so-called 'Blue' and 'Violet lines' in 1913–14, however these agreements were rendered null and void following the collapse of the Ottoman Empire after the First World War.

=== Early 20th century ===
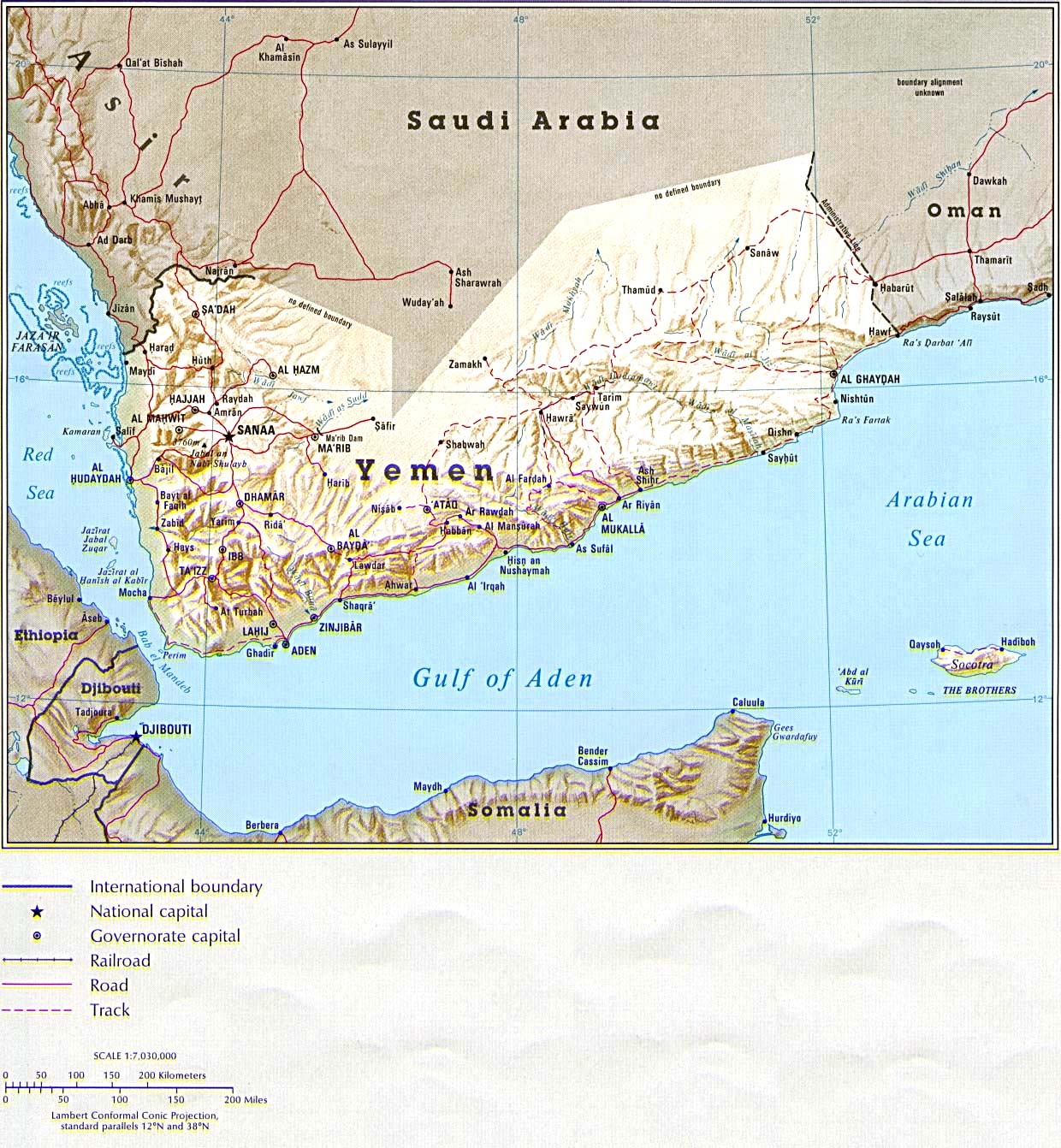
Map of Yemen from 1993, showing a typical portrayal of the boundary prior to the signing of 2000 Treaty of Jeddah

During the First World War, an Arab Revolt, supported by Britain, succeeded in removing the Ottomans from the Arabian Peninsula; in the period following this Ibn Saud managed to expand his kingdom considerably, eventually proclaiming the Kingdom of Saudi Arabia in 1932. In the south-west the Idrisid Emirate of Asir had taken advantage of the Ottoman withdrawal and declared independence in 1917, only to be annexed by the Saudis in 1926–1930. More successful was the Mutawakkilite Kingdom of Yemen (later known as the Yemen Arab Republic or North Yemen) further south, which declared independence in 1918.

North Yemen and Saudi Arabia had no defined frontier and disputed ownership of border territories (notably Asir, Jizan and Najran, claimed by North Yemen as part of 'Greater Yemen'); these tensions culminated in a border war in 1934, in which Saudi Arabia won control over most of the disputed territories. By the Treaty of Taif, signed in Taif on 12 May 1934, a partial border was drawn that extended inland to the vicinity of Najran, being demarcated on the ground in the following two years. This treaty was renewable every 20 years. Through the treaty, Saudi Arabia acquired "temporary sovereignty" over Jizan, Asir and Najran, while granting borderland tribes the right to cross the boundary without a visa (a move intended to assure the loyalty of these tribes towards the Saudi state).

On 25 November 1935 British officials met with Ibn Saud in an attempt to finalise a frontier between the new kingdom and Britain's Arabian protectorates, including Aden colony. The conference proved abortive however and the issue remained unresolved. Aden later gained independence (as South Yemen, later the People's Democratic Republic of Yemen) in 1967, with the border issue still unresolved. In 1969 Saudi Arabia and South Yemen fought the brief Al-Wadiah War over the remote border town of Al-Wadiah, which ended in Saudi Arabia retaining sovereignty over the town.

=== Later 20th century ===
It appears that the Treaty of Taif was renewed as scheduled in 1974, though the details of the renewal remained uncertain, largely as Yemen did not wish to be seen to be renouncing its traditional claim to Asir, Jizan and Najran. Following the unification of Yemen in 1990, the upcoming need to renew the Treaty of Taif, and also the discovery of oil in the border region, prompted the reinstigation of boundary negotiations in 1992. Negotiations stalled due to the Yemen Civil War in 1994, but were renewed the following year, resulting in the signing of a Memorandum of Understanding on 26 February 1995. This re-affirmed the terms of the Taif Treaty and allowed for further discussions over the rest of the border.

=== 21st century ===
In 2000 the Treaty of Jeddah was signed, which finalised the entire border at its current position.

From May 2022 to June 2023, Saudi Arabian border guards killed hundreds of Ethiopian migrants and asylum seekers. Human Rights Watch has qualified these killings as crimes against humanity. In addition to killing and beating migrants, the Saudi border guards were also reported to have raped female migrants, as well as forcing local men and boys to carry out these rapes. As of June 2024, border killings were reported to still be occurring on a regular basis.

== Border barrier ==
From 2003 Saudi Arabia began constructing a barrier along the border, citing terrorism concerns. There have been numerous clashes along the border following the Houthi takeover in Yemen, prompting Saudi Arabia to militarily intervene in Yemen in 2015.

== Settlements near the border ==
=== Saudi Arabia ===
- Muwassam
- Al Hathirah
- At Tuwal
- Hujayrah
- Wa'lan
- Al Quful
- Ajam
- Khushaym
- Al Aridah
- As Sayyabah
- Ad Da'ir
- Marwah
- Qaryat al Yahya
- Al Mijazah
- Al Mufajah
- Najran
- Al-Wadiah
- Al Kharkhir

=== Yemen ===
- Midi
- Hard Wadi Sulayman
- Al Wuqaysh
- Al Minzalah
- Al Malahit
- Al Hassamah
- Ad Daya'ah

== See also ==
- Oman–Saudi Arabia border, formally defined in 1990
- Oman–Yemen border
- Saudi Arabia–Yemen barrier
- Saudi Arabia–Yemen relations
