= Second Saudi–Rashidi War =

WW1 conflict in current Saudi Arabia

Second Saudi-Rashidi War
- Part of the Unification of Saudi Arabia and the Middle Eastern theatre of World War I
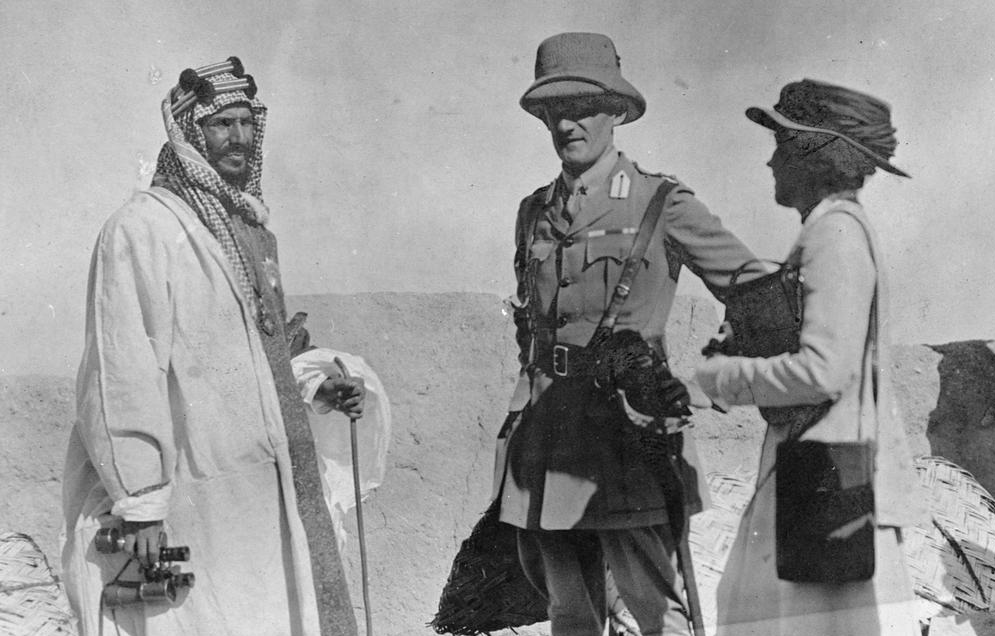
- Percy Cox (middle) and Gertrude Bell (right) with Ibn Saud (left) (1916)
| Date | 26 December 1915 – October 1918 |
| Location | Qassim region, Arabia |
| Result | Inconclusive |

Belligerents
| Nejd and Hasa; Supported by: (United Kingdom of Great Britain and Ireland) British Empire; Kuwait | Jabal Shammar; Supported by: Ottoman Empire; Ajman tribe |

Commanders and leaders
| Abdulaziz Ibn Saud (United Kingdom of Great Britain and Ireland) William Shakespear † | Saud bin Abdulaziz; Saud bin Saleh Al Sabhan † |

Strength
| (1915) 2,000; (1918) 5,000 | (1915) 1,800; (1918) Unknown |

The Second Saudi-Rashidi War was fought between the British-aligned Emirate of Nejd and Hasa and the Ottoman-allied Emirate of Jabal Shammar.

== Background ==
Following the First Saudi–Rashidi War, the Emirate of Nejd, under Abdulaziz Ibn Saud, consolidated its control over the Qassim region and the territories to its south, effectively becoming the dominant power in central Arabia—an area within modern-day Saudi Arabia. During this period, both the Emirate of Nejd and the Emirate of Jabal Shammar (ruled by the Al Rashid dynasty) maintained complex relationships with the Ottoman Empire. Jabal Shammar was a more consistent Ottoman ally, receiving military and material support. Although Nejd at times formally acknowledged Ottoman suzerainty—Ibn Saud was even appointed qaimmaqam (district governor) of southern Nejd by the Ottomans in 1905—it largely operated with significant autonomy, particularly after defeating the combined Rashidi-Ottoman forces and securing the Ottoman withdrawal from Qassim in 1906. In 1913, taking advantage of Ottoman preoccupation with conflicts in Libya and the Balkans, Ibn Saud's forces captured the Al-Hasa region from its Ottoman garrison, an act that the weakened Ottoman Empire was compelled to recognize.

=== Neutrality and alignments during World War I ===
At the outbreak of World War I in 1914, the Emirate of Nejd and Hasa, under Ibn Saud, initially declared neutrality. The Emirate of Jabal Shammar also initially declared neutrality but subsequently became an active military ally of the Ottoman Empire and the Central Powers, receiving arms and conducting operations against Allied interests. Kuwait, which had been a British protectorate since the Anglo-Kuwaiti Agreement of 1899, likewise declared neutrality. However, following the Ottoman Empire's entry into the war on the side of the Central Powers, Britain formally declared Kuwait "an independent shaikhdom under British protection" in November 1914 and maintained its defense throughout the conflict, effectively aligning it with Allied interests.

=== Negotiations ===
Captain William Shakespear, a British political officer and explorer, played a crucial role in establishing and maintaining official British contact with Ibn Saud, also serving as his military advisor from 1910 until Shakespear's death in 1915. During World War I, the British actively sought a formal alliance with the Emirate of Nejd and Hasa, primarily to counter the Emirate of Jabal Shammar, whose pro-Ottoman stance and raids threatened British operations in the Mesopotamian campaign. These negotiations culminated in the Treaty of Darin in December 1915, through which Britain recognized Ibn Saud's authority over Nejd and Hasa (which thereby became a British protectorate), and Ibn Saud agreed to enter the war as a British ally against Ottoman-aligned forces, particularly Jabal Shammar, in return for financial and military support. Simultaneously, the Ottoman Empire sought to secure Ibn Saud's allegiance, offering incentives and appealing to pan-Islamic sentiment in an effort to maintain Arab support against the Allies.

== The Battle of Jarrab ==
During the Battle of Jarrab on January 24, 1915, although Ibn Saud's cavalry initially outperformed their Al Rashid counterparts, the infantry forces of Al Rashid ultimately overcame Ibn Saud’s troops, resulting in an overall victory for Jabal Shammar. The withdrawal of the Ajman tribe from the battlefield—perceived by Ibn Saud as a betrayal—contributed significantly to this defeat, led to the sacking of his camp, and sparked the subsequent Ajman revolt.

Captain William Shakespear was killed in combat during the battle. His death strained British confidence in Ibn Saud and is considered by some historians to have influenced the course of the Arab Revolt, potentially leading to increased British support for Sherif Hussein of Mecca over Ibn Saud.

== The Treaty of Darin ==
The Treaty of Darin, signed on December 26, 1915, was an agreement between the Emirate of Nejd and Hasa and the United Kingdom, represented by Sir Percy Cox. The treaty established the emirate as a British protectorate and defined its territorial boundaries. Under the terms of the agreement, the British committed to providing financial assistance—a monthly stipend of £5,000—and weapons. In return, the Emirate of Nejd and Hasa agreed not to engage in hostilities against any of the United Kingdom's allies and not to enter into agreements with other foreign powers without British consent. Although the rivalry between Nejd and Jabal Shammar had been longstanding, the Treaty of Darin provided crucial support that enabled the Emirate of Nejd and Hasa to more effectively pursue its conflict with Jabal Shammar, an ally of the Ottoman Empire.

=== Supplying Ibn Saud and Jabal Shammar ===
At the beginning of 1915, the Ottoman Empire provided substantial support to Jabal Shammar, including an estimated 10,000 rifles and ammunition. Following the Treaty of Darin, the Emirate of Nejd and Hasa received its monthly stipend of £5,000 from the United Kingdom, which was further supplemented in January 1917 by an annual subsidy of £60,000. In addition, Ibn Saud's forces obtained weapons from the British, including a significant shipment in June 1916.

== Military actions, 1915–1918 ==
=== Ajman revolt and early clashes ===
Throughout much of 1915, following the Battle of Jarrab, Ibn Saud's forces were occupied with suppressing the Ajman revolt. The Battle of Kanzan was a particularly significant engagement during this internal conflict, in which Ibn Saud was defeated and wounded. Some British authorities, particularly those favouring Sharif Hussein, viewed Ibn Saud's military progress with skepticism. Consequently, in November 1916, Sir Percy Cox, the British Political Resident in the Persian Gulf, arranged meetings—including discussions at Al-Aqeer and a conference in Kuwait—with Ibn Saud and Sheikh Jabir Al Sabah of Kuwait to mediate an end to hostilities between the Saudis and the Ajman tribe and to coordinate regional efforts. Meanwhile, Jabal Shammar conducted raids against Nejd and Kuwait throughout 1916. In early 1916, Kuwait supported Nejd by sending 200 men to assist in its defence.

=== Jabal Shammar's actions in 1916 and 1917 ===
Jabal Shammar continued its struggle against Nejd. In March 1917, Jabal Shammar launched a significant attack on the Hejaz, which was allied with Britain. They also carried out raids along the Hejaz railway, targeting Hejazi forces and providing assistance to Ottoman troops during the siege of Medina.

=== The arrival of Sir Percy Cox and British requests to Ibn Saud ===
Sir Percy Cox became the primary British official engaging with Ibn Saud after Captain Shakespear's death, facilitating the Treaty of Darin in December 1915. Cox continued to play a significant role in the region, later helping to negotiate the Uqair Protocol in 1922 as High Commissioner for Iraq. In late 1917, Harry St. John Philby was dispatched by the British on a diplomatic mission to encourage Ibn Saud's more active participation in the war effort, specifically urging an offensive against Jabal Shammar. While aware of Nejd's ongoing conflict with the Ottoman-aligned Jabal Shammar, the British sought more direct and coordinated participation from Ibn Saud in the broader war. Ibn Saud explained to Philby that launching a major offensive at that time was difficult due to the rugged and mountainous terrain of Jabal Shammar, the strength of Ha'il's fortifications, and his limited arsenal.

=== Nejd's 1918 offensive ===
Following British encouragement and material support, Ibn Saud launched an offensive against Jabal Shammar in August 1918 with approximately 5,000 troops. By September, his forces had advanced close to Ha'il, the capital of Jabal Shammar. However, Nejd terminated the offensive in October, partly due to reports that Hejaz had made peace with Jabal Shammar and in response to British advice. The British counselled Ibn Saud to cease hostilities as they wished to avoid provoking King Hussein of Hejaz and preferred Jabal Shammar to remain as a potential regional counterbalance at that time. Nevertheless, the campaign yielded significant spoils for Nejd, reportedly including the capture of 1,500 camels, many sheep, and 10,000 cartridges, and further weakened Jabal Shammar.

== Gallery ==
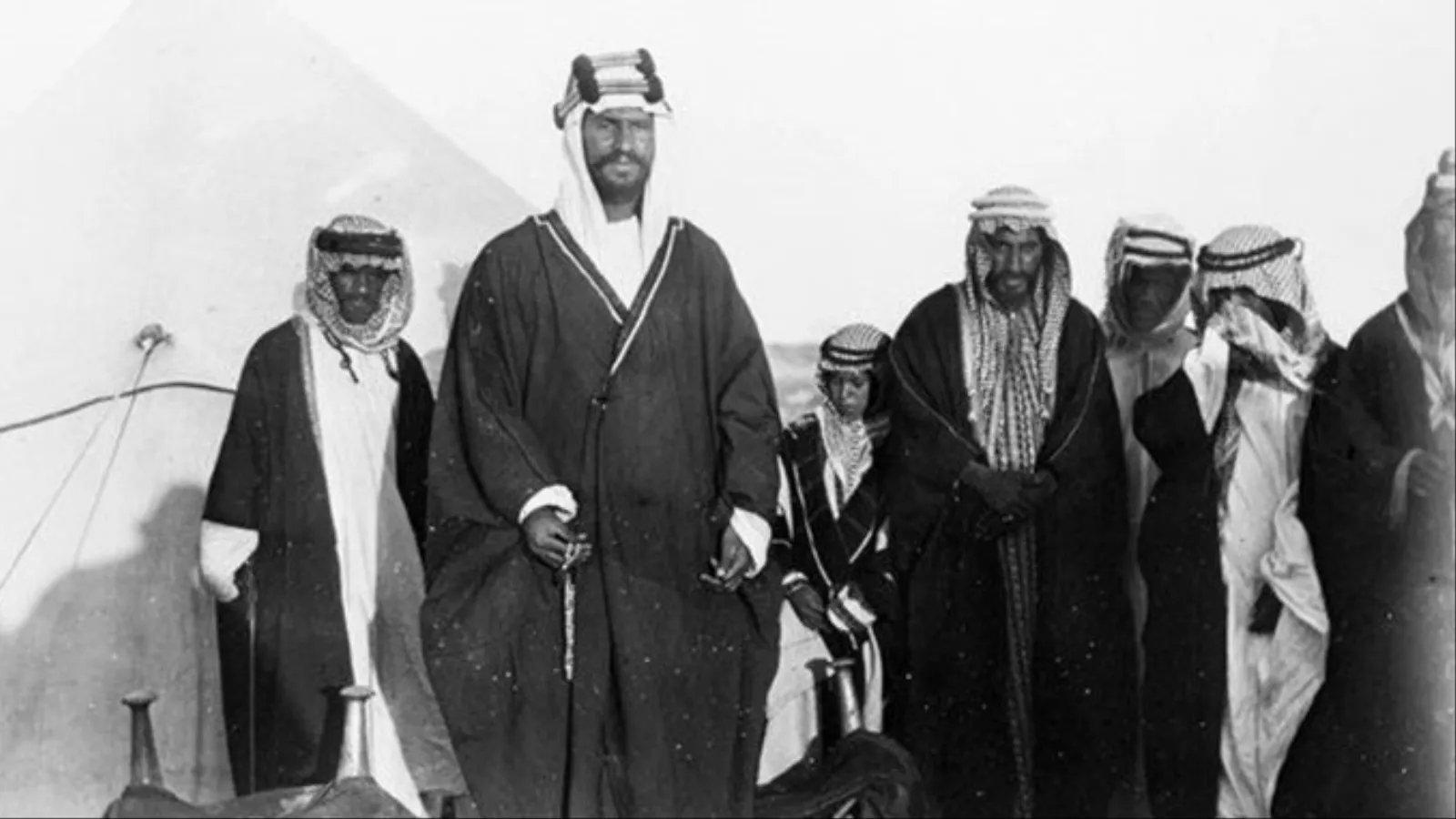
King Abdulaziz with Sheikh Faisal bin Sultan Al-Dawish next to him, photographed by the English officer Shakespear the day before the Battle of Jerrab, where Shakespear was killed.

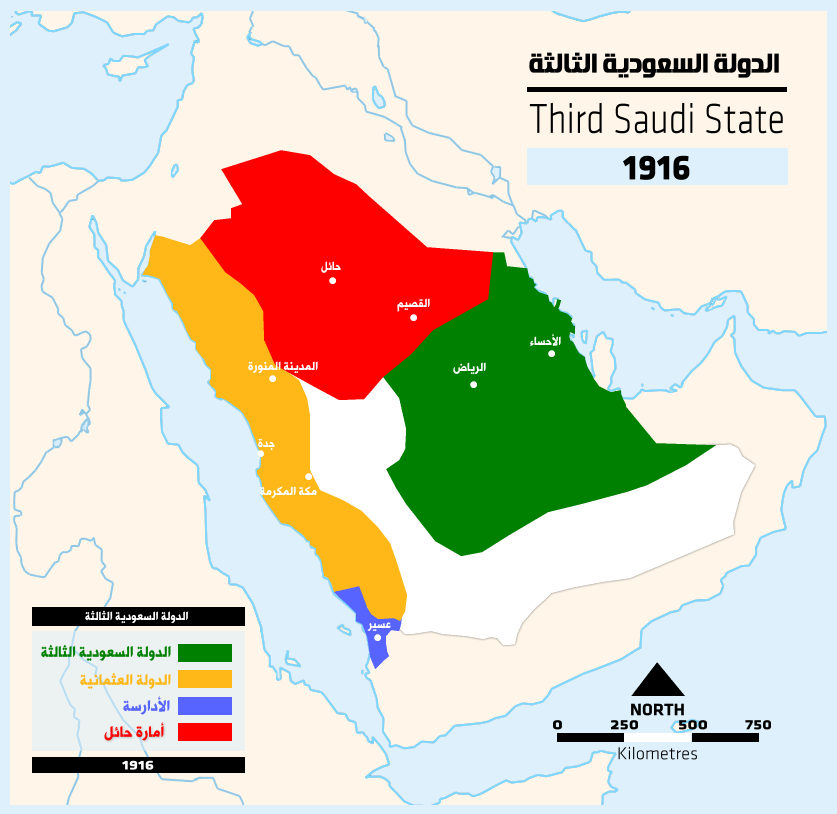
Nejd during 1916, in green

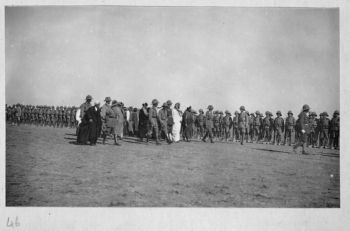
Ibn Saud in Iraq during the Second Saud-Rashidi War

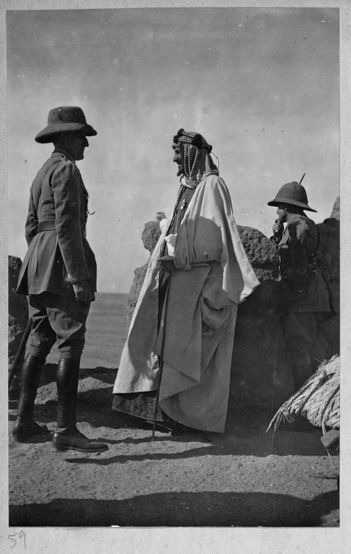
Ibn Saud in Basra during WWI

== See also ==
- List of wars involving Saudi Arabia
- Jebel Shammar in World War I
- Battle of Ha'il
