= Dhaydan bin Hithlain =

Arab tribe chief (died May 1929)

Dhaydan bin Khalid bin Hizam bin Hithlain
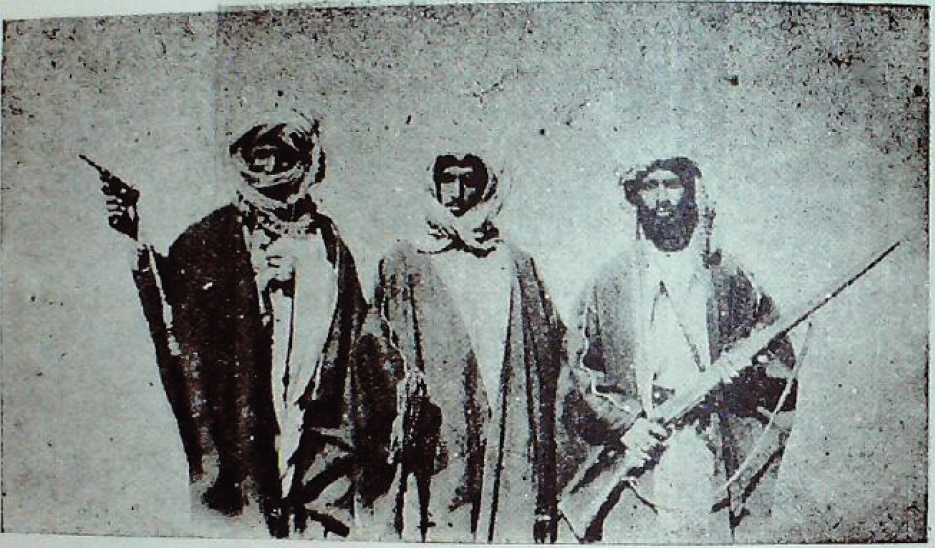
- Dhaydan (in the middle) with fellow tribesmen
- Died: May 1929; Uyayna
- Relatives: Faisal Al Duwaish (nephew)
- Military career
- Allegiance: Emirate of Riyadh (1910–1921); Sultanate of Nejd (1921–1926); Ikhwan (1927–1929)
- Branch: Ikhwan
- Service years: 1914–1929
- Unit: Ikhwan from the Ajman tribe
- Conflicts: Battle of Kanzan; Unification of Saudi Arabia; Ikhwan revolt

Dhaydan bin Hithlain (Arabic: ضيدان بن حثلين; died May 1929) was one of the leaders of the Ajman tribe and Amir of the hijrah (settlement) of Al Sarrar. His full name was Dhaydan bin Khalid bin Hizam bin Hithlain. Alexei Vassiliev also calls him Zaidan.

== Biography ==
The mother of Faisal Al Duwaish, another tribe leader and one of the significant Ikhwan chiefs, was the sister of Dhaydan bin Hithlain. When Ibn Saud captured the base of the Al Ajman tribe, Al Ahsa, in 1913, the tribe resisted the Saudi forces due to the termination of their privileges granted to them by the Ottomans. However, after the disputes with Ibn Saud were settled, Dhaydan joined the Ikhwan movement in 1919. Soon he became one of major Ikhwan leaders in addition to Faisal Al Duwaish, Sultan bin Bajad Al Otaibi and Muhsin Al Firm. However, Dhaydan and Muhsin Al Firm were relatively minor Ikhwan figures in contrast to Faisal Al Duwaish and Sultan Al Otaibi. In 1915 the forces of the Ajman tribe led by Dhaydan bin Hithlain did not manage to defeat Al Rashid troops in the battle of Jarrab.

In late 1926 the Ikhwan leaders met in Al Artawiyah and made a pact to contribute one another against Ibn Saud if he would attack one of them. They also shared the regions among themselves, and Dhaydan bin Hitlain assumed the responsibility of Al Ahsa region. Because they thought that Ibn Saud would appoint them as emirs of these regions. However, their plans were not materialized when Ibn Saud's sons, brothers and cousins were given the post. As a result, their relation with Ibn Saud became much more strained.

Ibn Saud held a meeting in Riyadh in October 1928 to settle the conflicts with the Ikhwan leaders, but none of them attended the meeting. As a result, Dhaydan bin Hithlain and others were removed from their posts in the Ikhwan movement due to their challenge against Ibn Saud's rule. In addition, they were declared by Ibn Saud as rebels on the same date. On 30 March 1929 other Ikhwan leaders rebelled against Ibn Saud due to the latter's activities and fought against him in the battle of Sabilla. Ibn Saud won the battle, and the Ikhwan leaders were arrested or perished. Dhaydan bin Hithlain did not openly confront with Ibn Saud during and following the battle and sent him a letter expressing his loyalty. However, Dhaydan bin Hithlain covertly supported the Ikhwan forces, although his forces did not take part in the battle.

After the battle Dhaydan bin Hithlain remained in Al Ahsa. In May 1929 he was invited to the camp of Fahd bin Abdullah, son of Abdullah bin Jiluwi who was the governor of Al Ahsa province. He and his five companions were murdered by Fahd who was in turn killed by the members of the Ajman tribe. Dhaydan's son, Rakan, and Nayef bin Hithlain succeeded him as the leaders of the Ajman tribe.
