= Battle of Kanzan =

Tribal battle in Arabia in 1915

- Part of the Unification of Saudi Arabia and the Middle Eastern theatre of World War I
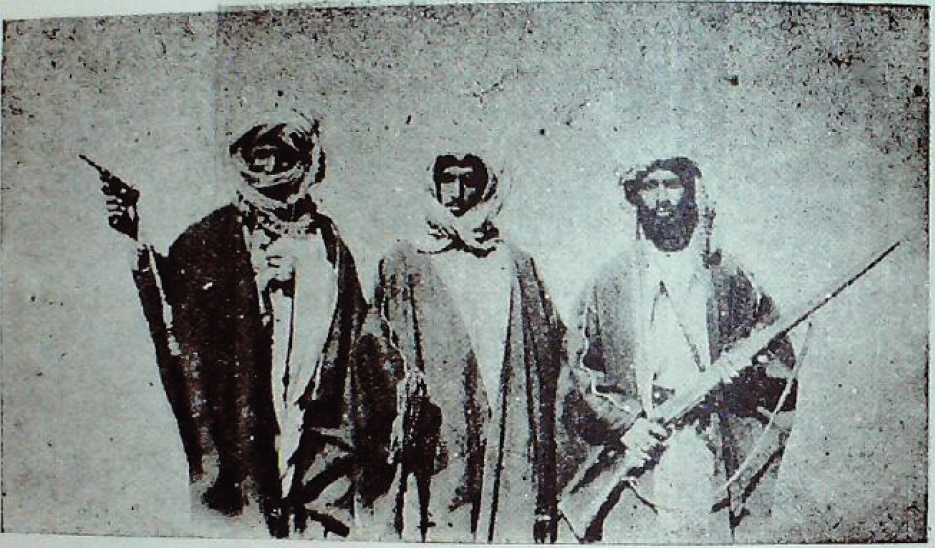
- Dhaydan bin Hithlain is in the middle of the picture
Date	June 1915 (the siege then continued for about six months)
Location	Jabal Kanzan, Al Ahsa, Arabia 25°34′N 49°42′E
Result	Ajman tribe victory

Belligerents
Ajman tribe	Emirate of Nejd and Hasa; Sheikhdom of Kuwait

Commanders and leaders
Dhaydan bin Hithlain; Other leaders of Ajman	Ibn Saud (WIA); Saud Al Kabeer; Muhammad bin Abdul Rahman; Sa'ad bin Abdul Rahman Al Saud †; Mubarak I

Strength
<3,000	1,200–4,000

Casualties and losses
350	Unknown

The Battle of Kanzan was a territorial battle between the Al Saud and their long-term enemies, the Ajman tribe, which began in June 1915 and lasted for nearly six months. The reason for the battle was the tribe resisting the Al Saud rule.

== Background ==
The Ajman tribe's rebellion against the Al Saud rule began in 1854 during the Emirate of Nejd, also called the second Saudi State. They again challenged the rule of Faisal bin Turki in 1860, but Faisal sent a large force against the Ajman tribe led by his son Abdullah who defeated them. Next year the Ajman tribe reattempted to end the rule of Faisal which became a total destruction to them. However, the tribe got advantages from the Ottomans in the region during this period.

In the period between 1910 and 1912 rebellious grandsons of Saud bin Faisal, uncle of Abdulaziz Al Saud, including Saud Al Kabeer left Riyadh and joined the Ajman tribe. This incident made the relations between the tribe and Abdulaziz much more strained. Abdulaziz captured Al Ahsa in 1913 where the majority of the Al Ajman led by Dhaydan bin Hithlain were settled in and therefore, they became part of his rule. Abdulaziz cancelled the privileges of the tribe to maintain stability in the region which caused further tensions with them. In the battle of Jarrab the forces of Abdulaziz were defeated by the Al Rashid forces on 24 January 1915 which resulted in the death of Abdulaziz's British military advisor Captain William Shakespear. The reason for the defeat of Al Saud forces is given by both Arabic and British sources as the withdrawal of the Ajman tribe from the battlefield. Ajman's hostility against the Al Saud increased following the battle of Jarrab.

In addition, the Ajman tribe stole some of the livestock belonging to the Kuwaitis and Al Zubayr, and the Emir of Kuwait, Mubarak bin Sabah, complained Abdulaziz about this incident and added that the Ajman tribe had sought refuge in their areas near Al Ahsa. Although Abdulaziz asked Dhaydan bin Hithlain to return the stolen livestock, he did not accept it.

== Battle ==
Due to the factors given above Abdulaziz initiated an attack with an army of 4,000 men (3,500 from Hassa and 500 from Najd) against the Ajman tribe, numbering somewhat fewer than 3,000, in June 1915 which is called the battle of Kanzan. Abdulaziz was encamped near Hofuf and the Ajman at Gunzan, about 20 miles west. The battle took place in Jabal Kanzan, part of Al Ahsa region, Arabia. However, the tribe asked him to make an agreement due to their lack of necessary fighters which was welcomed by Abdulaziz, and they planned to meet soon to finalize the peace agreement. Saad bin Abdul Rahman, younger full brother of Abdulaziz, objected this plan, and under his pressure the Al Saud made a night attack on the tribe, who unexpectedly resisted. In the battle Al Saud forces were defeated, and Abdulaziz was wounded and his brother, Saad, was killed. In addition, the Ajman tribe surrounded Abdulaziz's forces for almost six months, and only through the assistance of Abdulaziz's cousin Saud Al Kabeer and his half-brother Muhammad Abdulaziz managed to end the battle. Abdulaziz also twice asked for assistance from Kuwaiti royal and future ruler of Kuwait, Salim bin Mubarak. Mubarak's aid came late, but contributed to Abdulaziz's escape from the Al Ajman's attacks. However, the Al Saud also lost other members in the final phase of the battle, including Faisal, brother of Saud Al Kabeer.

== Aftermath ==
Mubarak bin Sabah wrote a long letter to Abdulaziz criticising his tactics. The British political agent in Kuwait reported that Mubarak 'has no longer any confidence in Abdulaziz as a military leader.' Around 23 September 1915 Abdulaziz reported a successful military action against the Ajman, including the use of artillery, at Suwaiderah. The Ajman claimed that most of the 350 Ajman dead were women and children (whose deaths were admitted by the Saudi side), and it does appear that Abdulaziz's cavalry failed in destroying the main Ajman force, who Terence Keyes, the British political agent in Bahrein, learned had, 'though severely handled by Bin Saud’s guns, got away in good order', albeit 'evidently badly shaken.' In October Abdulaziz reported that his Bani Khalid tribesmen had inflicted severe losses on the Ajman at Jubail.

Although the Ajman tribe had been victorious at Kanzan, they could not stay in the region and escaped to Kuwait where they lived under the protection of Jabir Al Sabah, the ruler of Kuwait. However, they soon had to leave Kuwait and settled in the southwestern Iraq.

In November 1916 Percy Cox met with Abdulaziz and Jabir Al Sabah in Basra to end the hostility between the Al Saud and the Ajman tribe which resulted in an agreement stating that the parties would not attack each other from now on. However, the agreement was not fully obeyed by both parties.

== See also ==
- List of wars involving Saudi Arabia
