= List of wars involving Saudi Arabia =

This is a list of wars involving the Kingdom of Saudi Arabia and its predecessor states.

== First Saudi state (1744–1818) ==
| Conflict | Combatant 1 | Combatant 2 | Result | Monarch |
|---|---|---|---|---|
| Ottoman-Saudi War (1811–1818) | Emirate of Diriyah | Ottoman Empire; Eyalet of Egypt | Ottoman-Egyptian victory | Saud I |

== Second Saudi state (1824–1891) ==
| Conflict | Combatant 1 | Combatant 2 | Result | Monarch |
|---|---|---|---|---|
| Attack on Dammam (3–4 February 1866) | Emirate of Nejd | United Kingdom | Saudi victory | Abdullah bin Faisal |
| Al-Hasa Expedition (1871) | Emirate of Nejd (Faction of Saud bin Faisal) | Ottoman Empire; Sheikhdom of Kuwait (Allied with faction of Abdullah bin Faisal) | Ottoman victory • Ottoman annexation of Al-Hasa and Qatif • Establishment of the Najd Sanjak | Saud bin Faisal |

== Emirate of Riyadh (1902–1913) ==
| Conflict | Combatant 1 | Combatant 2 | Result | Monarch |
|---|---|---|---|---|
| First Saudi–Rashidi War (1903–1907) | Emirate of Riyadh: Otaibah tribe; Mutayr tribe | Emirate of Ha'il; Ottoman Empire | Saudi Victory | Ibn Saud |
| Conquest of al-Hasa (1913) | Emirate of Riyadh: Ikhwan | Ottoman Empire | Riyadh victory | Ibn Saud |

== Emirate of Nejd and Hasa (1913–1921) ==
| Conflict | Combatant 1 | Combatant 2 | Result | Monarch |
|---|---|---|---|---|
| Second Saudi-Rashidi War (1915–1918) | Emirate of Nejd and Hasa | Emirate of Jabal Shammar | Inconclusive: Saudi offensive halted | Ibn Saud |
| Kuwait–Najd War (1919–1920) | Emirate of Nejd and Hasa: Ikhwan | Emirate of Kuwait | Inconclusive: Uqair Protocol of 1922; Kuwait lost more than two thirds of its territory as a result of the agreement | Ibn Saud |

== Sultanate of Nejd (1921–1926) ==
| Conflict | Combatant 1 | Combatant 2 | Result | Monarch |
|---|---|---|---|---|
| Conquest of Ha'il (1921) | Sultanate of Nejd | Emirate of Jabal Shammar | Victory: Incorporation of Jabal Shammar. | Ibn Saud |
| Saudi Conquest of Hejaz (1924–1925) | Sultanate of Nejd: Ikhwan | Kingdom of Hejaz | Victory: Incorporation of Hejaz. | Ibn Saud |

== Kingdom of Saudi Arabia (1932–present) ==
| Conflict | Combatant 1 | Combatant 2 | Result | Monarch |
|---|---|---|---|---|
| Saudi–Yemeni War (1934) | Saudi Arabia | Yemen | Victory: Treaty of Taif signed on 14 June 1934, guaranteeing 20 years of peace between Saudi Arabia and Yemen; Saudi Arabia leaves and Yemen gains control of Al-Hudaydah; Jizan, Asir, and Najran became the provinces of Saudi Arabia | Ibn Saud |
| First Arab–Israeli War (1948–1949) | Arab League: Egypt; All-Palestine Protectorate (Note: After 22 September 1948); Holy War Army; Transjordan; Iraq; Syria; Lebanon (Note: Lebanon had decided to not participate in the war and only took part in the battle of al-Malikiya on 5–6 June 1948.); Saudi Arabia; Yemen Irregulars: Arab Liberation Army; Al-Najjada; Holy War Army | Israel Before 26 May 1948: (Israel) Yishuv; Paramilitary groups: Haganah; Palmach; Hish; Him; Irgun; Lehi; Allied Bedouin tribes After 26 May 1948: Israel Defense Forces; Minorities Unit; Foreign volunteers: Mahal | Defeat: Arab League invasion of former Mandatory Palestine repelled; 1949 Armistice Agreements; Establishment of the State of Israel, Jordanian annexation of the West Bank, Egyptian occupation of the Gaza Strip; 1948 Palestinian expulsion and flight; Beginning of the Palestinian Fedayeen insurgency | Ibn Saud |
| North Yemen Civil War (1962–1965) | Kingdom of Yemen; Saudi Arabia | Yemen Arab Republic United Arab Republic | Defeat: Saudi Arabia stopped supplying the Royalists | Saud bin Abdulaziz Al Saud |
| Al-Wadiah War (1969) | Saudi Arabia; Pakistan | South Yemen | Victory: al-Wadiah and Sharurah captured by Saudi forces | Faisal bin Abdulaziz Al Saud |
| Yom Kippur War (1973) | Egypt; Syria; Expeditionary forces Saudi Arabia Algeria Jordan Libya Iraq Kuwait Tunisia Morocco Cuba North Korea | Israel | Defeat: At the final ceasefire: Egyptian forces held 1,200 km^{2} (460 sq mi) on the eastern bank of the canal.; Israeli forces held 1,600 km^{2} (620 sq mi) on the western bank of the canal.; Israeli forces held 500 km^{2} (193 sq mi) of the Syrian Bashan region of the Golan Heights. | Faisal bin Abdulaziz Al Saud |
| Lebanese Civil War (1976–1979) | (Arab League) ADF: Syria; Saudi Arabia; Sudan; United Arab Emirates; Libya; South Yemen | LF; FLA | Victory: ADF mission goals achieved; ADF becomes an all-Syrian force in 1979 | Khalid bin Abdulaziz Al Saud |
| 1979 Qatif Uprising (1979) | (Saudi Arabia) Government; Ministry of National Guard; National Guard; Ministry of Interior; General Directorate of Investigations; General Directorate of Public Security | Opposition; Shia Islamists; Organization for the Islamic Revolution in the Arabian Peninsula; Leftists; Communist Party in Saudi Arabia; Union of Democratic Youth; Democratic Women's League of Saudi Arabia; National Union of Students of Saudi Arabia; Assembly of Saudi Citizens; The Workers' Committee | * Crackdown on Shiite opposition groups: Political exile of Saudi Shiites to Iran; Extra government spending announced in Qatif region to address inequalities; Religious intolerance and state discrimination continue until 2015 | Khalid bin Abdulaziz Al Saud |
| Grand Mosque seizure (1979) | Saudi Arabia | Ikhwan | Victory: Saudi troops suppress uprising; Execution of Juhayman and his followers publicly by decapitation | Khalid bin Abdulaziz Al Saud |
| Gulf War (1990–1991) | Kuwait; United States; United Kingdom; Saudi Arabia; France; Canada; Egypt; Syria; Oman; United Arab Emirates; Qatar; Italy; Australia | Iraq | Victory: Iraqi withdrawal from Kuwait; Emir Jaber Al-Ahmad Al-Jaber Al-Sabah restored; Heavy casualties and destruction of Iraqi and Kuwaiti Infrastructure | Fahd bin Abdulaziz Al Saud |
| Iraqi No-Fly Zone Enforcement Operations (1991–2003) | United States; United Kingdom; France; Australia; Belgium; Netherlands; Saudi Arabia; Turkey; Italy | Iraq | Victory: Various bombings of Iraqi forces both aerial and naval; Mass numbers of Iraqi targets killed or destroyed; Reduction in Iraqi air defense; Beginning of the Iraq War | Fahd bin Abdulaziz Al Saud |
| First Intervention in the Somali Civil War (1992–1995) | United States; United Kingdom; Spain; Saudi Arabia; Malaysia; Pakistan; Italy; India; Greece; Germany; France; Canada; Botswana; Belgium; Australia; New Zealand | (Somalia) Somali National Alliance | Defeat: Failure to capture SNA leader Mohamed Farrah Aidid; specific Aidid lieutenants captured; Civil war is ongoing | Fahd bin Abdulaziz Al Saud |
| Operation Ocean Shield (2009–2016) | NATO; Malaysia; South Korea; India; Saudi Arabia | (Somalia) Somali pirates | Victory: Number of pirate attacks have decreased dramatically since the start of such operations, however attacks still occur near the coast waters of Oman, Yemen, Kenya, and Somalia; Piracy drops 90% | Abdullah bin Abdulaziz Al Saud |
| Sixth Sa'dah War (2009–2010) | Yemen; Saudi Arabia; Jordan; Morocco | Houthis | Stalemate: Houthis consolidate control over Sa'dah | Abdullah bin Abdulaziz Al Saud |
| American-led intervention in the Syrian civil war (2014–2018) | CJTF-OIR: United States; United Kingdom; France; Saudi Arabia; United Arab Emirates; Italy; Denmark; Jordan | | Forces withdrawn | Abdullah bin Abdulaziz Al Saud |
| War on ISIS (2014–) | Iraq; Iraqi Kurdistan; Free Syrian Army; Rojava; United States; United Kingdom; Jordan; Turkey; Saudi Arabia; Bahrain; Qatar; United Arab Emirates; Morocco; Australia; Belgium; Canada; France Egypt; Germany; Denmark; Norway; Russia; Iran | Islamic State al-Nusra Front; Khorasan | Ongoing: Multinational intervention against Syrian Islamists | Abdullah bin Abdulaziz Al Saud |
| Saudi Arabian–led intervention in Yemen (2015–) | (Yemen) Hadi government Saudi Arabia; United Arab Emirates; Senegal; Sudan; Qatar; Bahrain; South Korea; Kuwait; Jordan; Morocco; Egypt; France | (Yemen) Houthi government: Houthis; (Yemen) Saleh loyalists; Ansar al-Sharia Islamic State | Ongoing: Houthis dissolve Yemeni government; Houthis take control of northern Yemen; Conflict in Najran, Jizan and Asir | Salman bin Abdulaziz Al Saud |
| 2017–2020 Qatif unrest (2017–2020) | Government of Saudi Arabia; Ministry of National Guard; National Guard; Presidency of State Security; General Directorate of Investigations; Emergency Force; Ministry of Interior; General Directorate of Public Security | Hezbollah Al-Hejaz (Suspected); Other Shia Militias; Supported by: Al-Mukhtar Brigades (Bahrain) Bahraini Militias | Saudi victory | Salman bin Abdulaziz Al Saud |
| Direct Involvement in the Middle Eastern Crisis (2025-present): Houthi–Saudi Arabian conflict; Red Sea Crisis; Intelligence support to Israel during Iranian strikes; Defensive during the Twelve Day War; 2026 Iranian strikes on Saudi Arabia | October 7 attacks: Israel; Armed Israeli Citizens Gaza War & West Bank Incursions: Israel; Israeli-backed groups: Popular Forces; Fatah-affiliated groups Defensive Only: Palestinian Authority Intelligence support during April & October Iranian strikes: USA; UAE; Saudi Arabia; Jordan (also intercepted attacks); Due to strikes by Iraqi militias (until 2024): USA; Israel; UK; Jordan; Rojava; (Syria) Al-Tanf; 2024 Kerman Bombings: Islamic State Defensive during Iranian Retaliatory Strikes: Kurdistan Region; Syrian Salvation Government; Pakistan; Jaysh al-Adl; Prosperity Guardian (until 2024): USA; United Kingdom; Australia; Bahrain; Canada; Denmark; New Zealand; Norway; Seychelles; Singapore; Sri Lanka; Aspides (until 2024): European Union; Independent Patrols (Red Sea Crisis): China; Egypt; India; Pakistan; Saudi Arabia Syrian Civil War (until 2024): Hay'at Tahrir al-Sham; Southern Operations Room; Free Syrian Army; Syrian National Army; From 2024: Syria Twelve Day War: United States Israel Defensive only: Iraq; Jordan (also intercepted attacks); Saudi Arabia; Qatar; France; 2025-26 Iranian protests: Iranian opposition; Anti-government demonstrators; Student demonstrators; Police and military defectors; Armed civilians; Political groups: Iran National Council (INC); Mojahedin-e-Khalq (MEK); National Council of Resistance of Iran (NCRI); Solidarity for a Secular Democratic Republic in Iran; Separatist groups: Kurdish separatist; Democratic Party of Iranian Kurdistan; Kurdistan Freedom Party; Kurdistan Free Life Party; Xebat; Komalah; Revolutionary Toilers Association; Kurdistan Toilers Association; Kurdistan National Guard; Zagros Tornado units; Baloch separatists; People's Fighters Front; Balochistan People's Party; Azerbaijani separatists; South Azerbaijan Organisations Cooperation Council; Coordination Council of Azerbaijani Parties in Iran; Salafi Jihadists; Labour, civil, and retiree groups: Free Workers Union of Iran; Iranian Writers Association; Coordination Council of Iranian Teachers Trade Associations; Haft Tappeh Sugarcane Workers Syndicate; Coordination Committee to Help Form Independent Labour Organisations; Khuzestan Retired Workers; Union of Retirees Group; Kurdish Women's Organisations; Retirees Union; Kermanshah Electricity and Metal Association; "Stop Executions"; "Justice Seekers"; Coordination Council for Protests of Contract Oil Workers; Coordination Council for Protests of Non-Formal Oil Workers; Coordination Council of Nurses Protests; "Neday-e Zanan-e Iran"; World Iranian Christian Alliance; Supported by: United States (since 28 February 2026); Israel (since 28 February 2026); 2026 Iran War: Israel; United States; CPFIK (alleged and urged): Kurdistan Democratic Party of Iran (KDPI); Kurdistan Freedom Party (PAK); Kurdistan Free Life Party (PJAK); Organization of Iranian Kurdistan Struggle (Khabat); Komala of the Toilers of Kurdistan; Komala Party of Iranian Kurdistan; Attacked by Iran: Azerbaijan; Bahrain; Iraq; Kurdistan Region; Jordan; Kuwait; NATO; Turkey; (United Kingdom) Akrotiri and Dhekelia (Note: The United Kingdom has also undertaken defensive deployments outside of Akrotiri and Dhekelia); Oman; Qatar; Saudi Arabia; Syria; United Arab Emirates; Defensive actions: France; Greece; Italy; Netherlands; Spain; Anti-Iranian Protestors (outside Iran) | Iran; Ba'athist Syria (until 2024) Axis of Resistance: Hamas; Palestinian Islamic Jihad; Popular Front for the Liberation of Palestine; Democratic Front for the Liberation of Palestine; Al-Aqsa Martyrs' Brigades; Palestinian Mujahideen Movement; Palestinian Freedom Movement; Popular Resistance Committees; Popular Front for the Liberation of Palestine – General Command: Houthi Yemen; Yemeni Navy (SPC faction); Houthis; Hezbollah; Amal Movement; Islamic Group Islamic Resistance in Iraq: Popular Mobilization Forces; Kata'ib Hezbollah; Harakat al-Nujaba; Kata'ib Sayyid ul-Shuhada; Badr Organisation; Syrian Social Nationalist Party; Intelligence Support: Russia Syrian Civil War (until 2024): Ba'athist Syria; Russia; From 2024: Assadist insurgents Defensive during Israeli invasion of Lebanon: Lebanon; UN Defensive stances on attacks by Israel and allies: Lebanon; Yemen; Sri Lanka Pro-Iranian protestors (outside Iran) | Ongoing: Houthi attacks on September 2023 killed and injured Bahrain Defence Forces near Saudi-Yemen border.; Saudi Arabia claims to have intercepted Houthi attacks during the Red Sea Crisis.; As per the Times of Israel, Saudi Arabia provided intelligence about Iranian attacks to Israel During the 2024 Iran–Israel conflict.; According to Deutsche Welle, Saudi Arabia likely permitted Israel to use its airspace to intercept incoming Iranian missiles and drones.; 2026 Iran war: Ongoing | Salman bin Abdulaziz Al Saud |

== Further information ==
- Bowen, Wayne H. (2008). The History of Saudi Arabia. Westport, CN: Greenwood Press. p. 153. ISBN 978-0313340123. OCLC 166388162.
- "Wars involving Saudi Arabia". BBC.
