= Al Quwah =

- Village
- Location in Saudi Arabia
- Coordinates: 16°47′58″N 43°13′30″E
- Country: Saudi Arabia
- Province: Jizan Province
- Time zone: UTC+3 (EAT)
  - Summer (DST): UTC+3 (EAT)

Al Quwah is a village in Jizan Province, in south-western Saudi Arabia. It is on the border with Yemen.

== See also ==
- List of cities and towns in Saudi Arabia
- Regions of Saudi Arabia
