= Al-Wadiah War =

Conflict fought between Saudi Arabia and South Yemen

- Part of the Arab Cold War
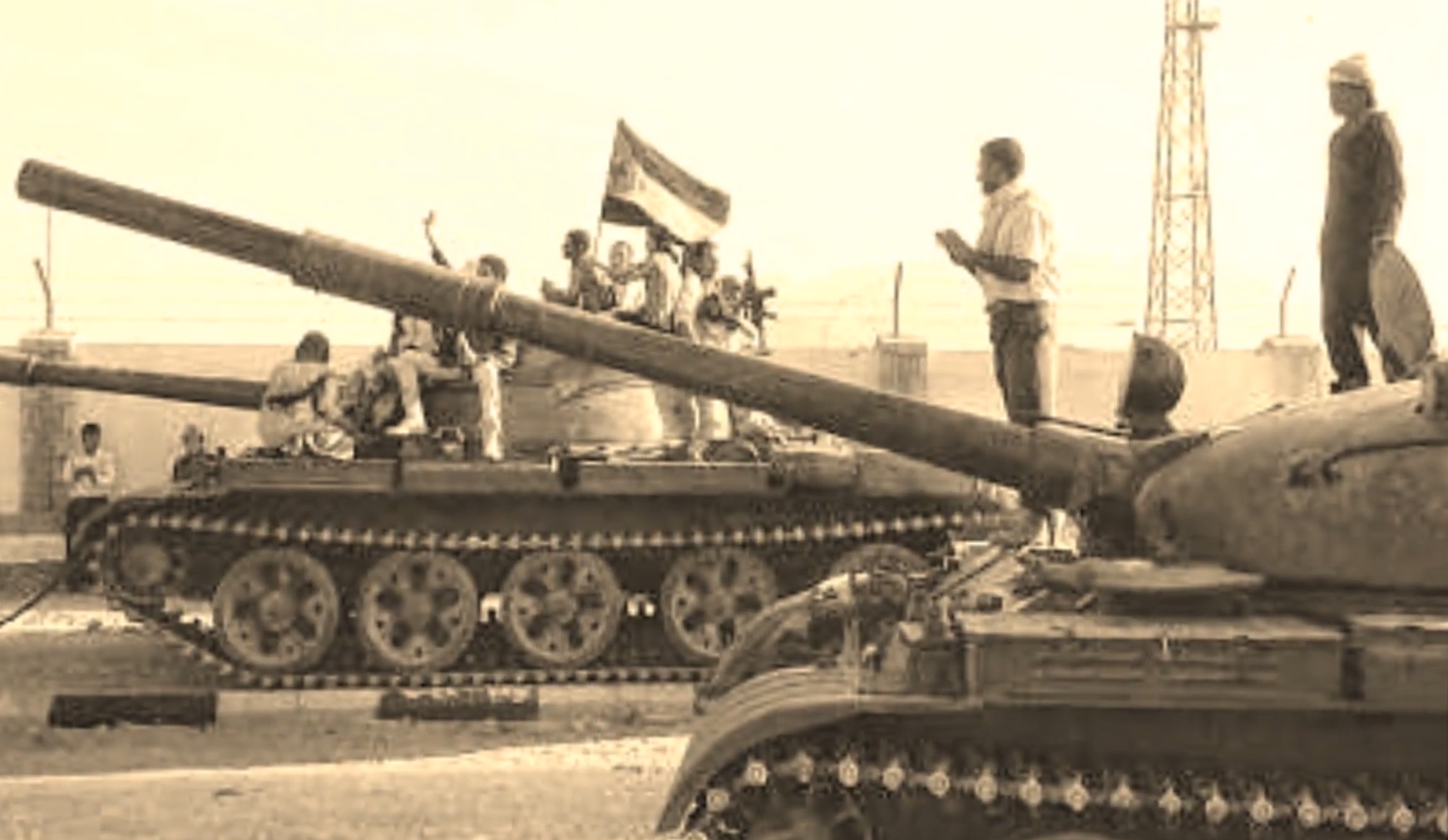
- Yemeni tanks at Wadiah
Date	27 November – 6 December 1969
Location	al-Wadiah and Sharurah
Result	Saudi victory
Territorial changes	al-Wadiah and Sharurah captured by Saudi forces

Belligerents
South Yemen	Saudi Arabia; Supported by: Pakistan (air support)

Commanders and leaders
Salim Rubaya Ali; President of South Yemen; Muhammad Ali Haitham; Prime Minister of South Yemen; Ali Salem al-Beidh; Minister of Foreign Affairs of South Yemen; Ali Abdullah Maisary; Leader of the People's Defense Forces; Faisal Attas; Governor of the Fifth Governorate	Faisal of Saudi Arabia; King of Saudi Arabia; Sultan bin Abdulaziz; Minister of Defense and Aviation

Units involved
(South Yemen) People's Defense Forces; (South Yemen) 30th Infantry Brigade	(Saudi Arabia) 130th Infantry Brigade; Royal Saudi Air Force; Pakistan Air Force personnel

Casualties and losses
35 killed (Saudi claim)	39 killed and 26 taken hostage

Al-Wadiah War (Arabic: حرب الوديعة) was a military conflict which broke out on 27 November 1969 between Saudi Arabia and the People's Republic of Southern Yemen (PRSY; South Yemen) after disputes over the towns of al-Wadiah and Sharurah on the PRSY-Saudi Arabian border. The conflict ended on 6 December when Saudi forces captured al-Wadiah.

== Background ==
Al-Wadiah is a part of the geographic Hadhramaut region, which had previously been part of the Qu'aiti Sultanate, itself part of the British Protectorate of South Arabia, which had been incorporated into the then-newly established South Yemen following the withdrawal of British forces from the region. The PRSY, therefore, considered the towns as part of its territory. The Saudi government, however, saw al-Wadiah as part of their territory, as well as a frontier in confrontations with the PRSY. There were also rumors of oil and water deposits around the town, thereby aggravating the dispute.

The town was located along the contentious border of South Yemen and Saudi Arabia, and had some fifteen years prior, in 1954–1955, been the site of a border dispute between the Saudis and the British.

Simultaneously Yemeni-Saudi relations had been incredibly tense, with Faisal of Saudi Arabia regarding the left-wing government with extreme hostility, which was in turn reciprocated by Yemen, which supported the overthrow of the Gulf monarchies. The Saudi government went so far as to fund and arm South Yemeni dissidents, and encouraged them to conduct raids across the border into South Yemen. Yemen accused the Saudi government of planning further attacks in November 1969.

In November 1969, the Saudis built a road to al-Wadiah and garrisoned soldiers there, incorporating it into the Kingdom. The Yemeni government claimed that the Saudis had occupied al-Wadiah to secure potential oil reserves in the area. The Saudi government, in turn, accused Yemen of seizing al-Wadiah.

== The war ==
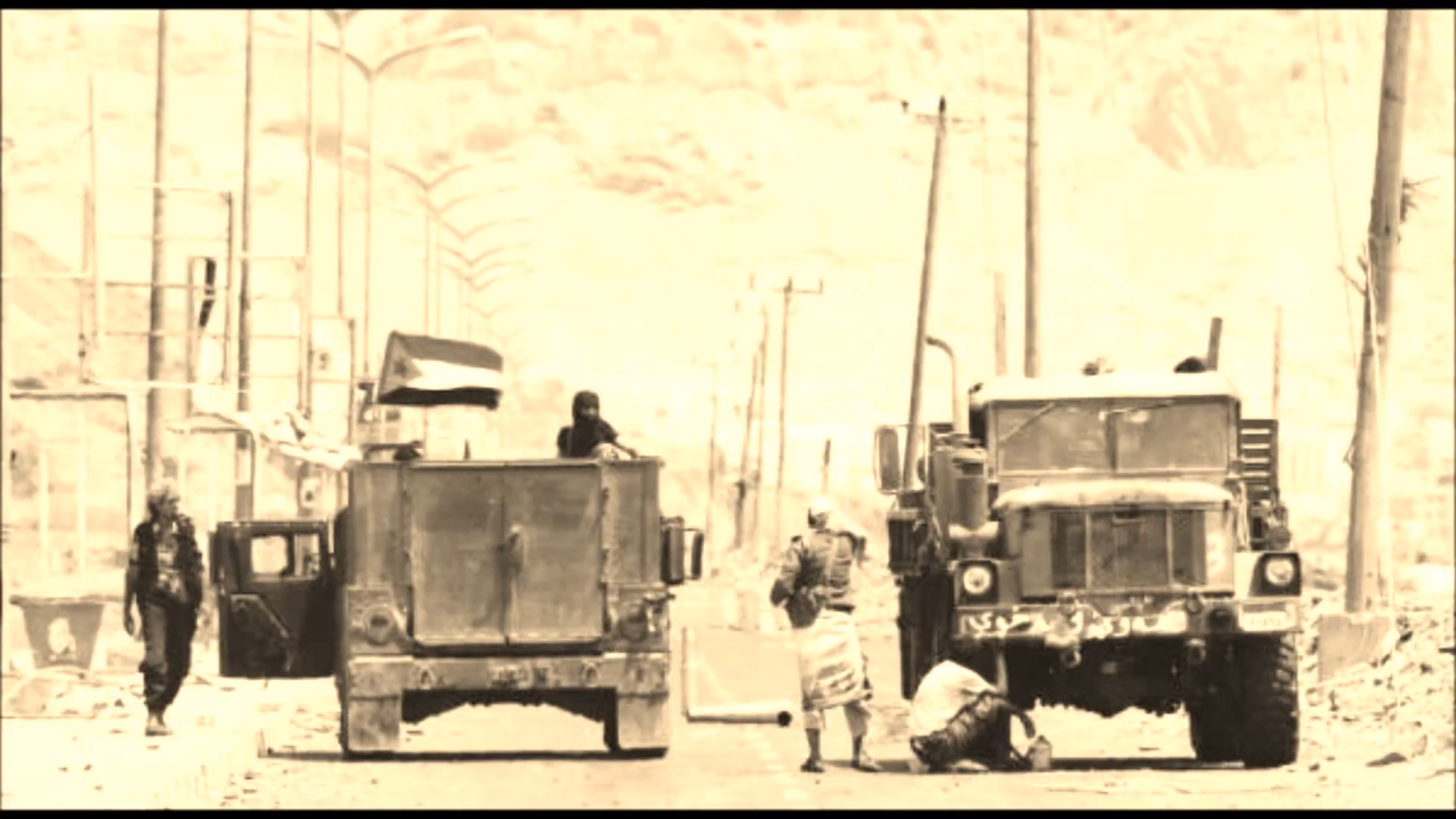
Yemeni troops at Wadiah

On 27 November 1969, PRSY regular army units advanced on and took the town of al-Wadiah. Saudi forces deployed in the region were limited to some tribal militias, backed by some aircraft and artillery. A small section of the PRSY force began advancing on Sharurah, but was halted.

Having been informed of the PRSY advance, King Faisal ordered Sultan bin Abdulaziz, the Minister of Defense and Aviation, to expel Yemeni forces. Sultan commissioned all units in the southern region for the task of attempting to reoccupy al-Wadiah within two days.

The initial part of the conflict was largely limited to aerial battles, with a series of air clashes taking place in late November and early December. During this initial period Iraq and Jordan attempted to mediate an end to the conflict.

The Royal Saudi Air Force also conducted a series of aerial bombardments on Yemeni positions. On one instance, English Electric Lightnings flown by Saudi and Pakistani pilots from Khamis Airbase launched devastating rocket attacks on Yemeni supply lines. These attacks continued over the course of two days, initially being directed at PRSY Army forces in the region, and later specifically at the PRSY leadership, whilst also attacking PRSY logistics.

At 9:45 in the morning, the Saudi ground offensive began advancing on Yemeni positions on two axes: A battalion of Saudi National Guard units, along with some other forces, advanced on Yemeni positions from the West. A second group, composed of exiled Yemenis and Saudi border guards, advanced on Yemeni positions from the east.

During the attack PRSY forces were divided into two pockets. A PRSY counterattack failed to unite the pockets. The following day clashes began at dawn, and continued throughout the day. The commander of the PRSY Brigade was killed in the fighting, following which PRSY forces began to withdraw. Saudi forces harassed PRSY forces during the retreat, although stopped at the border under orders.

Saudi forces then proceeded to take up defensive positions within al-Wadiah. Some abandoned PRSY equipment was seized.

The Saudis claimed to have occupied al-Wadiah by 5 December, and took journalists to the town. Saudi forces claimed to have killed 35 soldiers from the PRSY, and also claimed that they could have marched on Aden, the PRSY capital, had they not been ordered to stop at the border by King Faisal.

== Aftermath ==
Location of al-Wadiah on the modern-day Saudi Arabia–Yemen border after the Treaty of Jeddah of 2000

Following the conflict the Saudi government began a large scale program of construction of military sites in the region, whilst also deploying further military forces to Sharurah, close to al-Wadiah. Tensions continued, especially after the 1972 Tripoli Agreement, under which North and South Yemen agreed to unite, due to Saudi hostility to any merger. In March 1973 Saudi Arabia claimed that two PRSY MiGs had attacked al-Wadiah, although the PRSY denied any such incident, and claimed Saudi Arabia was searching for a pretext for military intervention in South Yemen. There was a brief warming of relations between the two countries in November 1977, although this soon lapsed and ambassadors were recalled by both countries. There were further reports of clashes in January 1978, including the shooting down of 4 RSAF Lightnings by a PRSY MiG, although this was denied. There were minor clashes in February 1987.

The issue of ownership was finally settled by the Treaty of Jeddah of 2000, which affirmed Saudi ownership of the town.

== See also ==
- Saudi–Yemeni War (1934), a preceding Saudi–Yemeni conflict
- Houthi–Saudi Arabian conflict, a subsequent Saudi–Yemeni conflict
- List of wars involving Saudi Arabia
- List of wars involving Yemen
- Saudi Arabia–Yemen border
