= SHW =

SHW may refer to:

- Sharurah Domestic Airport, Sharurah, Saudi Arabia, IATA airport code SHW
- Shawford railway station, England, National Rail station code SHW
- Sherwin-Williams, NYSE stock symbol SHW
- Sheung Wan station, Hong Kong, MTR station code SHW
