= Battle of Jarrab =

1915 WWI proxy battle in Arabia

- Part of the Unification of Saudi Arabia and the Second Saudi-Rashidi War (1915–1918)
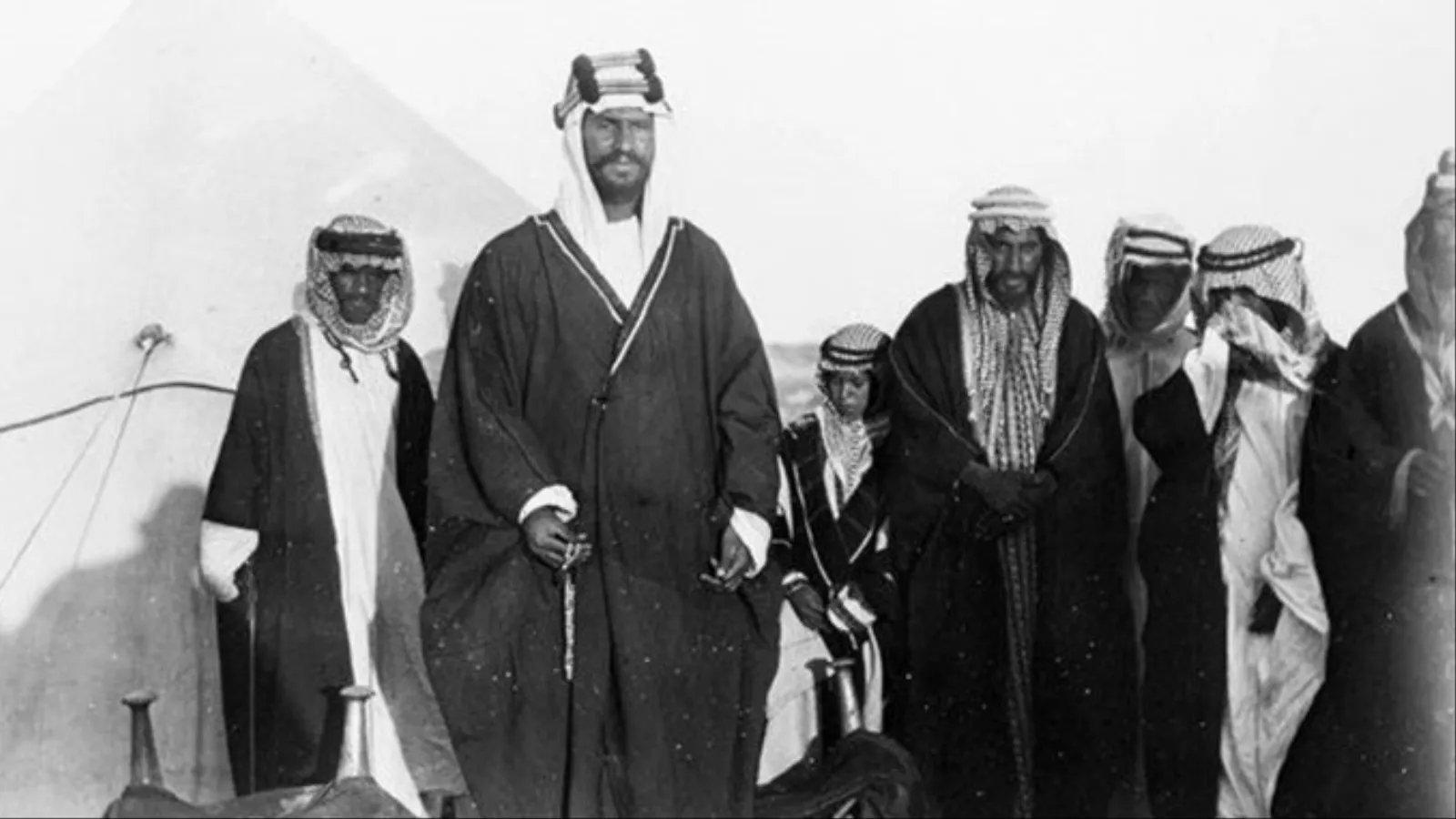
- A picture of King Abdulaziz with Sheikh Faisal bin Sultan Al-Dawish next to him, taken by the English officer Shakespear the day before the Battle of Jerab where Shakespear was killed.
Date	24 January 1915
Location	Jarrab Lake, North of town of Al Majma'ah, Arabia
Result	Jabal Shammar victory

Belligerents
Jabal Shammar; Supported by: Ottoman Empire	Nejd and Hasa; Supported by: (United Kingdom of Great Britain and Ireland) British Empire

Commanders and leaders
Al Rashid: Saud bin Abdulaziz; Saud bin Saleh Al Sabhan	Al Saud: Abdulaziz Ibn Saud (United Kingdom of Great Britain and Ireland) William Shakespear †

Strength
1,500–1,800	2,000

Casualties and losses
Few	600

The Battle of Jarrab was a territorial battle between the Al Saud and their traditional enemies, the Al Rashid on 24 January 1915. It was a proxy battle of World War I and the Second Saud-Rashidi War between the British-supported Saudis and the Ottoman-supported Rashidis.

Rashidi forces led by young Saud bin Abdulaziz Al Rashid defeated the forces of Ibn Saud. The main significance of the battle was the death of Ibn Saud's British Military Advisor, Captain William Shakespear. The battle is also remembered in some historical and tribal accounts for the bravery of Matni bin Shraim and his men, whose steadfast resistance and fierce fighting are said to have played a decisive role in turning the tide of the battle in favor of the Rashidi forces. While some sources attribute Ibn Saud’s defeat primarily to the withdrawal of the Ajman tribe led by Dhaydan bin Hithlain, other accounts emphasize the significant contribution of Matni bin Shraim and his companions in securing the Rashidi victory.

The defeat and the death of William Shakespear diminished the relationship between Ibn Saud and the British, changing the course of the Arab Revolt against the Ottoman Empire. It also resulted in other negative conclusions for Ibn Saud, including a year-long struggle with the Ajman tribe, namely the Battle of Kanzan, and the decrease in his newly emerged prestige.

== See also ==
- List of wars involving Saudi Arabia

== Literature ==
- Travellers in Arabia, Eid Al Yahya, Stacey International (2006). ISBN 0-9552193-1-0 (9780955219313).
- The Historical Journal 14 (3) (September 1971), pp. 627–633.
- H. St. John Philby. (1930). Arabia, London.
