= Saudi conquest of Al-Hasa =

1913 event in the unification of Saudi Arabia

Conquest of Al-Hasa
- Part of the Unification of Saudi Arabia
Date	4 – 6 May 1913
Location	Najd Sanjak, Ottoman Empire (present-day Eastern Province, Saudi Arabia)
Result	Saudi victory
Territorial changes	Annexation of Al-Hasa And Qatif; Formation of the Emirate of Nejd and Hasa

Belligerents
Third Saudi State; Emirate of Riyadh	Ottoman Empire

Commanders and leaders
Ibn Saud	(Ottoman Empire) Ahmet Nedim Bey (surrendered)

Units involved
Saudi Arabian Army; Ikhwan	Ottoman garrison

Strength
8,000	(Ottoman Empire) 1,200

The Saudi conquest of Al-Hasa, also known as the Battle of Al-Hasa, was a conflict in 1913 between the Third Saudi State and the Ottoman Empire. It ended with the capture of Al-Hasa and Qatif from Ottoman control and their incorporation into the Saudi state, forming the Emirate of Nejd and Hasa.

== Overview ==
The Turks were worried about the strong forces that Ibn Saud had gathered in the area of pastures and wells between Riyadh and Kuwait. Jamal Pasha, the governor of Baghdad, threatened to send two battalions to Najd, saying that they would march from one end to the other. The emir of Riyadh answered daringly that he would make Jamal Pasha’s task easier by decreasing the distance the battalions had to cover before meeting him. Ahmet Nedim Bey, the Turkish Mutasarrif of al-Hasa, sent his representative to Ibn Saud to discover his intentions. Ibn Saud claimed that he was going only to attack a tribe in Kuwait. Simultaneously he sent people to Hufuf to purchase a large amount of rice and dates. Through his agents in al-Hasa, the ruler of Najd learned of the location of the Turkish garrisons and established contacts with the local population. The Russian consulate in Basra reported back:

"The attack on Hufuf began at night. The Najdis used the trunks of palm trees, ropes and ladders, all prepared beforehand. The town soon fell, as did the Kut citadel, with the exception of the Ibrahim mosque in the fortress, where the Mutasarrif and a part of his garrison ensconced themselves. There were 1,200 Turks in Hufuf at the time."

The mosque was mined, and the people inside were warned that the mines would be detonated and the mosque stormed unless they surrendered. The Mutasarrif decided to lay down his arms. The men of the garrison were led out of the town by an escort headed by Ahmad ibn Sunayyan, a distant relative of Ibn Saud. The Turks left for Bahrain by sea.

The Shia religious community leaders of al-Hasa negotiated a surrender and recognition of the Saudi political authority in exchange for leniency and religious freedom, which was granted at the time by Ibn Saud.

The Ottomans swiftly acknowledged the loss of al-Hasa, and recognized al-Hasa and Nejd as being under the rule of Ibn Saud.

== Aftermath ==
In Bahrain, the British blamed the Turks for submitting to Ibn Saud and warned them of the consequences of the wrath of the supreme Ottoman authorities. They encouraged them to return to Al-Ahsa and enticed them with support and assistance. The Ottoman soldiers were deceived by the British’s advice and promise, so they chartered ships and returned to the port of Al-Uqair. They were confronted by a company headed by Bin Nader from Ibn Saud’s forces and clashed with them in a bitter fight that resulted in a number of deaths and the capture of thirty Ottoman soldiers. The news reached Ibn Saud while he was in Al-Ahsa, so he went out to Al-Uqair and released the Turkish prisoners. He sent the rest of the soldiers to Bahrain and wrote to the ruler of Bahrain and to the English political advisor there blaming them. They answered him: “The Turkish soldiers left Bahrain, heading to Basra, and we do not know who they were.”

== See also ==
- Unification of Saudi Arabia
- List of wars involving Saudi Arabia
- List of modern conflicts in the Middle East
