= Saudi Arabia–Yemen border killings =

Killings of Ethiopian refugees that started in 2022

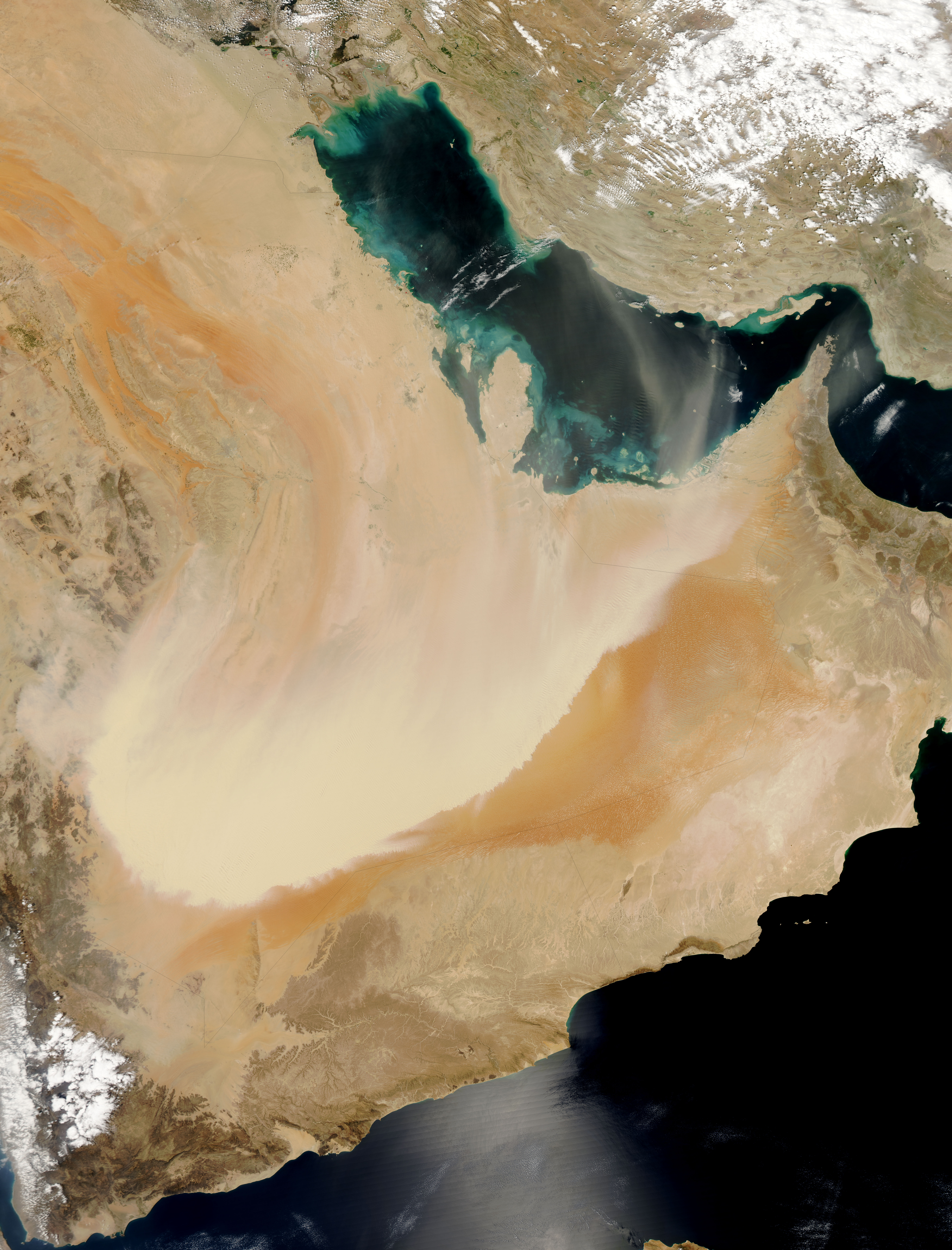
Saudi Arabia and Yemen seen from space.

Guards of the Saudi General Directorate of Border Guard have been accused of killing hundreds of Ethiopian refugees and asylum seekers along the Saudi Arabian–Yemeni border from March 2022 to June 2023. Human Rights Watch stated that these killings may qualify as crimes against humanity, with reports stating that explosive weaponry were used to kill many migrants at close range, including women and children. In addition to killing and beating migrants, the Saudi border guards were also reported to have raped female migrants, as well as forcing local men and boys to carry out these rapes.

As of June 2024, border killings were reported to still be occurring on a regular basis.
