= Treaty of Jeddah (2000) =

2000 treaty between Saudi Arabia and Yemen

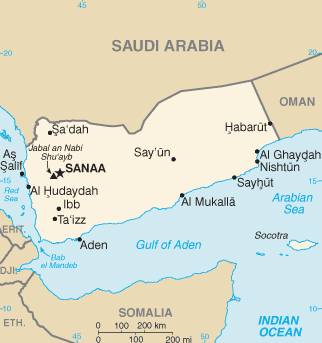
- Map of Yemen, showing the finalised northern border with Saudi Arabia
- Signed: June 12, 2000
- Location: Jeddah, Saudi Arabia
- Signatories: (Saudi Arabia) Saud al-Faisal; (Yemen) Abdul Qadir Bajamal

The 2000 Treaty of Jeddah resolved a border dispute between Saudi Arabia and Yemen dating back to Saudi boundary claims made in 1934.

== Background ==
The long-running dispute arose from the 1934 Treaty of Taif between Yemen and the newly-formed Saudi Arabia and the subsequent demarcation of the boundary three years later. Ambiguity in the placement of the border led to competing claims by Saudi Arabia and Yemen for the remainder of the twentieth century, complicated by traditional pre-colonial claims, crude border-marker placement and uncertainty as to the exact mountain peak named in the original treaty text. Two wars were fought over the border: in 1934 and in 1969. By the mid-1990s, governments of both nations acknowledged the need for a clear and mutually-agreed border, first with a Memorandum of Understanding dated February 1995, and then with a meeting at Lake Como, Italy that created the provisional "Como Line" in the summer of 1997.

However, progress would stall over the next three years, in part as the nations contested the exact placement of the maritime portion of the border as it met the Red Sea. This led to a series of border clashes, including confrontation between Yemeni and Saudi Arabian armed forces over Duwaimah Island (located south of the Farasan Islands) in July 1998.

== Signing ==
In May 2000, Crown Prince Abdullah of Saudi Arabia attended Yemen for the first time to commemorate the tenth anniversary of the Yemeni unification. Shortly after this meeting, and a series of intensive diplomatic talks, the two governments finally signed the Treaty of Jeddah in the Saudi port city on 12 June 2000 to take effect the following month. The signatories of the treaty were the Foreign Ministers of both nations as well as Yemeni Deputy Prime Minister Abd al-Rahman Bagammal. The treaty gave exact coordinates for the land and maritime border and included provisions for the pastoral rights of shepherds, placement of armed forces and future natural wealth extraction along the border.

== Aftermath ==
In 2003, Saudi Arabia began construction of a border wall with Yemen citing organised smuggling and security concerns. Following international diplomatic pressure and accusations that this violated the 20km buffer zone reserved for grazing in the 2000 treaty, Saudi Arabia agreed to halt construction and both sides to uphold the treaty in February 2004. However, Saudi Arabia would subsequently complete the wall between 2009-2010. The border has become increasingly patrolled and crossings restricted following the destabilising effects of the 2011 Yemeni Revolution and subsequent Saudi Arabian involvement in the ongoing Yemeni Civil War.

== See also ==
- List of territorial disputes
- Saudi–Yemeni War (1934)
- Saudi–Yemen barrier
- Saudi Arabia–Yemen border
