= Saudi–Yemen barrier =

Physical barrier along the Saudi-Yemeni border

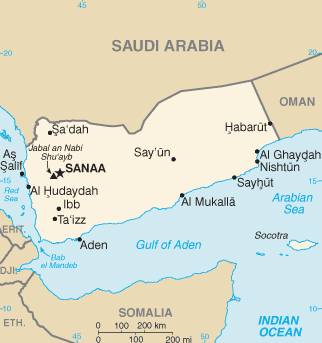
Map of Yemen, Saudi Arabia being north of it

The Saudi–Yemen barrier (Arabic: الجدار السعودي اليمني) is a physical barrier constructed by Saudi Arabia along part of its 1,800-kilometer (1,100 mi) border with Yemen. It is a structure made of pipeline three metres (10 ft) high filled with concrete, acting as a "security barrier along sections of the now fully demarcated border with Yemen" and fitted with electronic detection equipment.

Construction of the barrier began in September 2003 in order to counter infiltrations and terrorism. When construction of the 75-kilometer (47 mi) barrier by the Saudis began, the Yemeni government strongly objected, stating that it violated a border treaty signed in 2000. Thus, Saudi Arabia agreed to stop construction in February 2004.

== History ==
In 2000, after 65 years or so of sporadic conflict, Yemen and Saudi Arabia finally agreed on border demarcations by signing the 2000 Jeddah border treaty.

Crown Prince Sultan bin Abdulaziz, who has also been deputy prime minister and minister of defence, has long managed the Yemen portfolio. For decades, he paid a network of Yemeni contacts and informants, which generated resentment on the Yemeni side about Saudi "meddling". Sultan also headed the small Special Office for Yemen Affairs, which remained the main locus of Saudi Arabia's Yemen policy and patronage throughout the 1980s and 1990s, a role that weakened beginning in 2000. Its annual budget was believed to be $3.5 billion per year until the Treaty of Jeddah was signed in 2000. But even as late as early 2011, the "number of people thought to be receiving subsidies still remained in the thousands, but in April recipients were notified that payments were being terminated". The tribal elites Saudi Arabia supports to weaken Yemen central government are behind the drug trade. Saudi Arabia overreached, according to Yemen, "by accusing Yemeni smugglers of fomenting terrorism" because "homegrown Saudi terrorists—with or without weapons obtained from across the border—cannot be blamed on Yemen".

In February 2004, after extensive Egyptian and U.S. diplomatic efforts, Saudi Arabia decided to halt the construction, and Yemen agreed to take part in joint patrols and to set up watch towers to curb smuggling and infiltration. However, it was reported in October 2006, after plans were revealed of Saudi plans to build another fence along its border with Iraq, that the Saudis have enjoyed "relative success by building a similar, though shorter, security barrier-fence along their southern border with Yemen to cut down on the 400,000 illegal immigrants who cross it every year looking for work in the far more prosperous Saudi state. Saudi authorities also believe that the fence has "made their efforts to prevent the infiltration of revolutionary Islamists through Yemen far easier". In February 2007 the Arab Times reported that the “Saudis have been quietly pursuing an $8.5 billion project to fence off the full length of its porous border with Yemen for some years”.

In January 2008, Saudi authorities commenced construction of a wall along the border in the Harad district. A local sheikh claimed that erection of the wall broke the Jeddah border treaty that established the rights of both Yemeni and Saudi citizens to roam freely. The news website Mareb Press reported quoted a Yemeni military source saying that Yemeni border guards tried to prevent the construction, but the Saudis mobilized and threatened force if they were unable to commence work. Deep tunnels and concrete arches have been constructed and barbed wire has been laid along the frontiers to the south of the Saudi towns of Towal, Masfaq, and Khawjarah. Local sources from Harad stated that over 3,000 tribesmen from nearby gathered to rally against it, claiming their interests would be harmed by preventing them from crossing the border to visit their relatives and cultivate their farms.

During the Saudi Arabian-led intervention in Yemen, Saudi Arabia reportedly began removing sections of the Barrier fence along its border with the Sa'dah and Hajjah governorates on 3 April 2015. The purpose of the removal was not immediately clear.

=== Ethiopian migrant incidents ===
Over 90 percent of migrants on the 'Eastern Route' to Saudi Arabia are Ethiopians. Reasons for migration include economic reasons, as well as seeking refuge from conflict, famine, and persecution. This treacherous journey begins in the Horn of Africa, spans the Gulf of Aden, traverses war-torn Yemen, and eventually winds its way through the rugged terrain of Saudi Arabia's Jizan province.

Since 2017, Saudi Arabia has engaged in the arbitrary detention and involuntary repatriation of a substantial number of Ethiopian migrants who were caught crossing the Saudi-Yemen border. These actions have exposed migrants to severe and degrading conditions, leading to the emergence of serious and enduring physical and psychological health issues among those affected. As of 2022, at least 30,000 Ethiopian migrants who come illegally through Saudi–Yemen barrier, remain detained in Saudi Arabia solely for lack of legal residency and continue to suffer in overcrowded detention centres, facing the looming threat of experiencing a similar ordeal. Amnesty International utilized satellite verification to corroborate the existence and pinpoint the exact locations of the Al-Kharj and Al-Shumaisi detention centers which are located in Riyadh and Jeddah respectively. Additionally, geo-verified videos sourced from within these facilities provided concrete evidence, shedding light on the severe and distressing conditions prevailing within.

Borders guards of the Houthi who control the other side of the border have also been accused of mistreating Ethiopian migrants including sexually assaulting them.

Amnesty International's Regional Director for the Middle East and North Africa, Heba Morayef, strongly condemned the deprivation of human rights solely based on the absence of legal documents. She emphasized that lacking legal documentation should not be used as a justification for such human rights violations.

In June 2023, the International Organization for Migration Missing Migrant Project issued its own estimate of fatalities on the Saudi border which reports 795 or more Ethiopians lost their lives on the route between Saudi Arabia and Yemen between March 2022 to June 2023. Accounts collected by Human Rights Watch suggests that explosive weapons were fired at Ethiopian migrants by Saudi border guards, dismembering and killing many. Saudi border guards have also been accused of forcing migrants to rape one another, reportedly summarily executing someone who refused to do so.

== Government stances ==
=== Saudi Arabian concerns ===
In the early 1990s terrorist attacks in Saudi Arabia used explosives that came from Yemen. The border is 1,800-kilometer (1,100 mi), with much in the Rub' al Khali desert, or the "Empty Quarter". In October 2010 The New York Times called the border between Saudi Arabia and Yemen "an emblem of the increasingly global threats emanating from Yemen: fighters from Al Qaeda, Shiite [Houthi] insurgents, drugs and arms smuggling and, well under the world’s radar, one of the largest flows of economic refugees on earth".

Saudi Arabia claimed the barrier was necessary to protect from terrorism and smuggling weapons and illegal drugs—namely qat (and Yemen's most important export, with border tribes reportedly earning upwards of £100 million a year). Specifically, Saudi Arabia claimed that smugglers provide weapons to radical Islamists within Saudi Arabia and were the source of explosives used in attacks like the 2003 Riyadh compound bombings, which killed 35 and injured over a hundred. Two years after the Yemeni Revolution of 2011, the country found itself a "haven for foreign terror fighters" where the Yemen-based Al-Qaeda in the Arabian Peninsula has "remained resilient and even enjoyed a resurgence".

In 2008, after starting a new section of barrier in Harad District, the Saudis declared that the barrier was necessary to stem the influx of illegal immigrants and drug and weapons smuggling. Among the numerous Somali and Ethiopian refugees that arrive on Yemen's shores, thousands of them cross over into Saudi Arabia every day through the Harad District. Yemen's poverty means that most head to Saudi Arabia or other wealthy Gulf states that rely on imported menial labor. In addition, hundreds of Yemeni children have been trafficked in the past decade. In 2007 alone, more than 60,000 Yemenis were deported from Saudi Arabia.

=== Yemeni opposition ===
Opponents claim the barrier severely restricts the local population—in particular in their ability to cross the border to seek access work. The Yemeni government initially opposed the construction because it violated the 2000 Jeddah border treaty, which allowed for grazing rights for shepherds in a 13-mile (21 km) buffer zone on both sides and stipulated that no armed forces be stationed within it. The first 42-kilometer (26 mi) stretch of the barrier was erected less than 100 metres from the border line. At the time, the head of Saudi Arabia's border guard maintained that the barrier was being constructed inside Saudi territory.

Yemenis have complained that Saudi Arabia's support for various tribal and political figures in Yemen seemed aimed at keeping their southern neighbor divided and weak. Saudi Arabia reportedly spent billions of dollars a year to weaken Yemen's central rule and its republican government. As Yemen's instability and the threat of terrorism grew increasingly worse, The New York Times reported in 2010 that Western diplomats were noticing a shift in Saudi Arabia's approach to Yemen and its longtime president Ali Abdullah Saleh (who ended up resigning in February 2012).

== Comparisons ==
=== To Israeli West Bank barrier ===
In February 2004 The Guardian reported that Yemeni opposition newspapers compared the barrier to the Israeli West Bank barrier, while The Independent wrote, "Saudi Arabia, one of the most vocal critics in the Arab world of Israel's 'security fence' in the West Bank, is quietly emulating the Israeli example by erecting a barrier along its porous border with Yemen".

The head of Saudi Arabia's border guard dismissed the comparison, stating, "The barrier of pipes and concrete could in no way be called a separation fence. What is being constructed inside our borders with Yemen is a sort of screen...which aims to prevent infiltration and smuggling". However, only 10% of the Israeli barrier is concrete wall, with the remaining 90% chain-link fence.

== See also ==
- Border barrier
- Saudi-Iraq barrier
