= Attack on Dammam =

British–Saudi military clash in 1866

- Part of Faisal's invasion of Oman
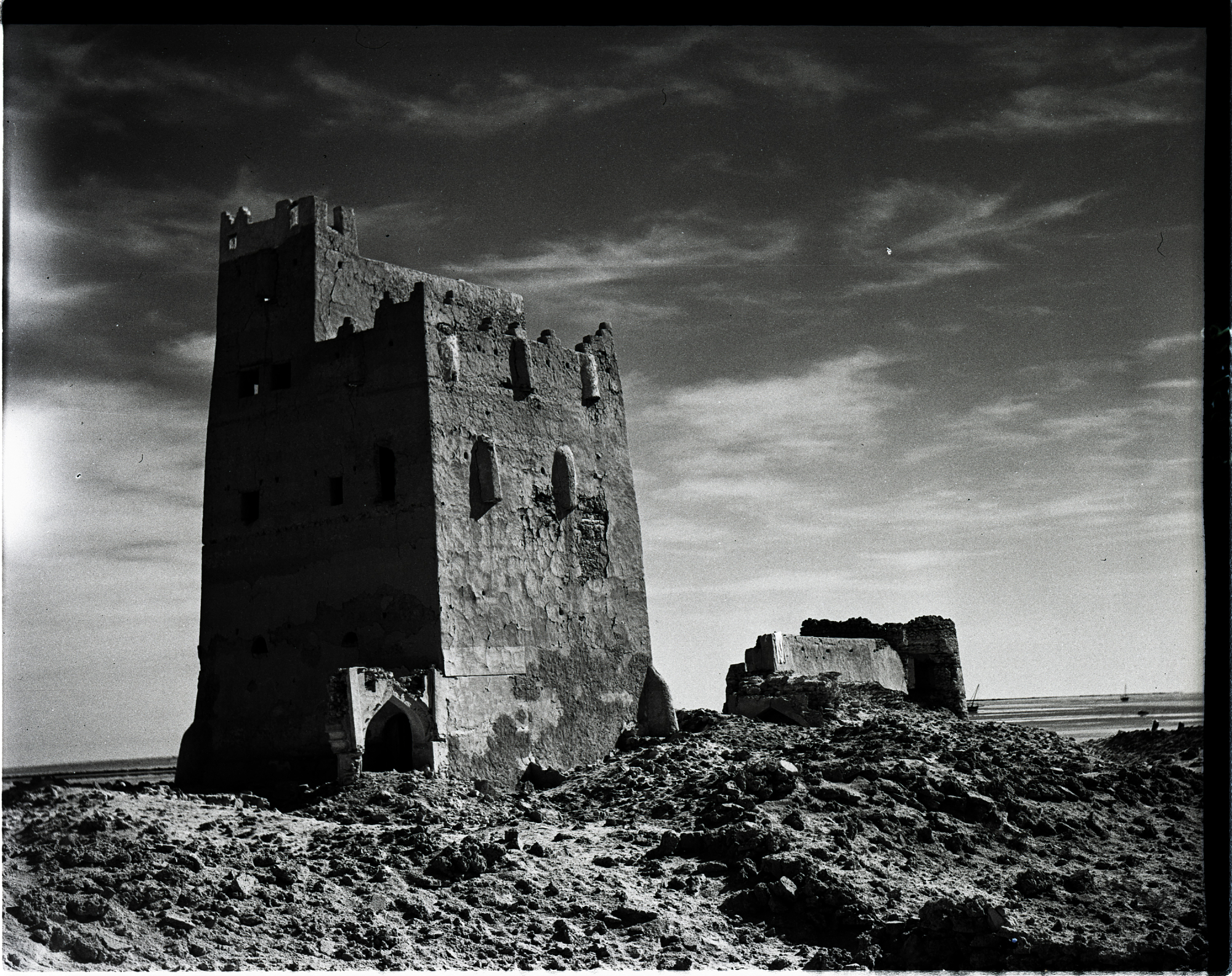
- Fort of Dammam, 1935
Date	3–4 February 1866
Location	Dammam, western Arabia (modern-day Saudi Arabia)
Result	Saudi victory

Belligerents
United Kingdom of Great Britain and Ireland	Second Saudi state

Commanders and leaders
Lt. Long	Abdullah bin Faisal

Strength
1 ship	12 men

Casualties and losses
3 killed 5 wounded	Unknown

The Attack on Dammam was an 1866 assault by the British ship HMS Highflyer to destroy a fort held by the Second Saudi state in the vicinity of Dammam following Faisal's invasion of Oman, which was allied with the British. The attack ultimately failed due to the lack of adequate preparatory measures by the British expedition.

== Background ==
In late 1865, the Saudis invaded Oman and headed towards the city of Saham. At that time, Oman was allied with the United Kingdom, and a British Indian had been killed by drowning during the attack. This prompted the British to send an ultimatum to Faisal, who died in December of that year. The message was sent to Abdullah bin Faisal. The British sought an official apology for the death of the drowned Indian and of ten other Indians who were plundered and demanded that the Saudis pay the equivalent of US$27,000 in reparations while also requiring assurance that no such attack would occur in the future. If he failed to reply in 17 days, the British warned they would attack the Saudis' forts on the coast. The British ship HMS Highflyer, which had been sent to Abdullah, returned to Qatif on 30 January. Finding no response from the Saudis, the British launched their attack on Dammam.

== Attack ==
On 2 February, Highflyer was sent to attack the Saudi forts at Qatif and Dammam. At Qatif, the British entered the harbor and destroyed a small fort called Burj Abul Lif, alongside a vessel, and then on the next day, the ship arrived in Dammam, led by Lieutenant Long. To destroy, if possible, the fort there, a party was landed, which had to walk through water some considerable distance from the fort, and attacked the place there, but finding the fort garrison much stronger than expected and unable to create an entrance, they were repulsed with a loss of three killed and five wounded (two officers and three men). On 4 February, the attack was renewed. Taking advantage of rising water, the fort was bombarded with shots, shells, and rockets; however, the walls could not be breached, and the fort remained in the hands of the Saudis.

The attack's failure was due to ignorance of local knowledge of the territory and experience, with only one native Arab accompanying the British expedition.

== Aftermath ==
When Highflyer returned to Muscat on 9 February, Captain Lewis Pelly learned of the defeat at Dammam and was determined to reassert British authority by punishing the Janabah tribe of Sur after they had already refused to pay compensation to the British.

== Sources ==
- R. Bayly Winder (2015), Saudi Arabia in the Nineteenth Century.
- Lorimer J. G. (1915), Gazetteer Of The Persian Gulf Oman And Central Arabia Vol-1 Part-1.
- A M Vasilev (2000), The History of Saudi Arabia.
- So'ad bint Abdullah Fadil (2024), Political and internal conflict in Oman during the period 1856-1868 AD and foreign positions on it (In Arabic).
