= Al-Wadiah =

Markaz in Sharurah Governorate, Najran Province, Saudi Arabia

Al-Wadiah الوديعة
- Markaz
- Location of Al-Wadiah in Saudi Arabia
- Coordinates: 17°13′N 47°09′E
- Country: Saudi Arabia
- Province: Najran Province
- Region: South Arabia
- Governorate: Sharurah Governorate

Government
  - Type: Municipality
  - Body: Sharurah Municipality (upper body); Al-Wadiah Municipality (Lower body)

Population (2022)
  - Total: 13,293
- Time zone: UTC+03:00 (SAST)
- Area code: 017

Al-Wadiah (Arabic: الوديعة) is a markaz in Sharurah Governorate, Najran Province, Saudi Arabia.

== History ==
Al-Wadiah was the site of the Al-Wadiah War in 1969. During the conflict, forces from the People's Democratic Republic of Yemen attacked Saudi Arabia, occupying the markaz and several other areas in the Sharurah Governorate. The Saudi Arabian Army launched a counteroffensive and successfully recaptured the occupied territories.

== Transportation ==
=== Air ===
Al-Wadiah markaz is served by Sharurah Domestic Airport, which connects the area to other cities within Saudi Arabia.

=== Border crossing ===
The markaz is also home to the Al-Wadiah Border Crossing, the only crossing with Yemen that has remained open since 2015.

== See also ==
- Provinces of Saudi Arabia
- List of governorates of Saudi Arabia
- List of cities and towns in Saudi Arabia
