= William Shakespear (explorer) =

English explorer (1878–1915)

William Shakespear CIE
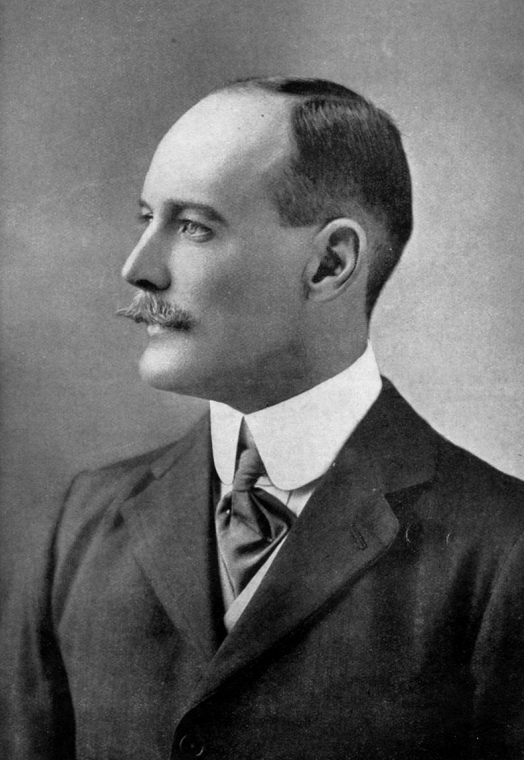
- Born: William Henry Irvine Shakespear; 29 October 1878; Bombay, British India
- Died: 24 January 1915 (aged 36); Lake Jarrab, Majmaah, Emirate of Nejd and Hasa
- Occupation: Civil servant
- Known for: Explorer who mapped uncharted areas of Northern Arabia

Captain William Henry Irvine Shakespear, CIE (29 October 1878 – 24 January 1915) was a British civil servant and explorer who mapped uncharted areas of Northern Arabia and made the first official British contact with Ibn Saud, future king of Saudi Arabia. He was the military adviser to Ibn Sa'ud from 1910 to 1915, when he was killed in the Battle of Jarrab by Matni bin Shraim, who was fighting with Ibn Rashid's men. He was buried in Kuwait.

== Early life ==
He was baptised in Multan, one of three sons of William Henry Sullivan Shakespear of the Imperial Forestry Service, and Anne Caroline Shakespear (née Davidson). All of the boys were enrolled at Portsmouth Grammar School in 1889. From 1893 he attended King William's College in the Isle of Man and then went on to Sandhurst. After graduating from Sandhurst he spent time in India where he served as a 2nd Lieutenant and in 1901 was appointed as an Assistant District Officer in Bombay.

In 1904 he was appointed Consul at Bandar Abbas in what was then Persia before being transferred in 1909 to Kuwait where he held the post of British Political Agent.

== Arabian expeditions ==
While in Kuwait, Shakespear made seven separate expeditions into the Arabian interior, during which he became a close friend of Ibn Sa'ud, then the Emir of the Nejd. It was Shakespear who arranged for Ibn Sa'ud to be photographed for the first time. Ibn Sa'ud had never seen a camera before. In March 1914, Shakespear began a 2,900-kilometre (1,800 mi) journey from Kuwait to Riyadh and on to Aqaba via the Nafud Desert, which he mapped and studied in great detail, the first European to do so. In November 1914, the British government in India asked Shakespear to secure Ibn Sa'ud's support for the British-Indian Mesopotamian Expeditionary Force, which had just taken Basra.

== Aftermath ==
It has been suggested by some authorities, notably St. John Philby, that the Arab Revolt against the Ottoman Empire might have been very differently directed if Shakespear had survived, that the British would have supported and armed Ibn Sa'ud rather than Sherif Hussein ibn Ali.

His death... was a great loss to his country, but it was a disaster to the Arab cause. It must certainly be reckoned in the small category of individual events which have changed the course of history. Had he survived to continue a work for which he was so eminently suited, it is extremely doubtful whether subsequent campaigns of Lawrence would ever have taken place in the west...

Percy Cox replaced Shakespear as the United Kingdom's liaison to Ibn Saud and held this position until 1922. Cox facilitated the signing of the Treaty of Darin, on the island of Tarut on 26 December 1915.
