= Sharurah =

City and Governorate in Najran Province, Saudi Arabia

Sharurah شرورة
- City and Governorate
- Location of Sharurah within Najran Province

- Location of Sharurah within Saudi Arabia
- Coordinates: 17°29′N 47°07′E
- Country: Saudi Arabia
- Province: Najran Province
- Region: South Arabia
- Seat: Sharurah

Government
  - Type: Municipality
  - Body: Sharurah Municipality

Area
  - City and Governorate: 90,000 km^{2} (35,000 sq mi)

Population (2022)
  - Metro: 100,199 (Sharurah Governorate)
- Time zone: UTC+03:00 (SAST)
- Area code: 017

Sharurah (Arabic: شرورة) is a city and governorate in Najran Province, southern Saudi Arabia. It is the largest governorate in the province by both area and population.

In 2014, Al-Kharkhir Governorate was abolished, and Sharurah absorbed its territory along with most of its population.

== Subdivisions ==
Sharurah has multiple subdivisions (markaz), including:

- Al-Wadiah
- Al-Akhashim
- Tamani
- Umm Al-Baramil
- Al-Qarayin
- Qalmat Khujaym
- Hamra’ Nuthayl
- Bahjah
- Qalmat Sultan
- Umm Al-Milh
- Majah
- Umm Ghuwayr

== Transportation ==
Sharurah is served by Sharurah Domestic Airport, which provides domestic flight connections.

== Climate ==
Sharurah has a hot desert climate (BWh) according to the Köppen climate classification.

Climate data for Sharurah Domestic Airport (1991–2020)
| Month | Jan | Feb | Mar | Apr | May | Jun | Jul | Aug | Sep | Oct | Nov | Dec | Year |
|---|---|---|---|---|---|---|---|---|---|---|---|---|---|
| Record high °C (°F) | 36.3 (97.3) | 39.1 (102.4) | 42.0 (107.6) | 46.2 (115.2) | 45.0 (113.0) | 46.7 (116.1) | 47.0 (116.6) | 46.2 (115.2) | 45.0 (113.0) | 41.0 (105.8) | 39.0 (102.2) | 36.8 (98.2) | 47.0 (116.6) |
| Mean daily maximum °C (°F) | 27.2 (81.0) | 30.7 (87.3) | 34.4 (93.9) | 37.8 (100.0) | 40.9 (105.6) | 42.6 (108.7) | 43.3 (109.9) | 42.7 (108.9) | 40.6 (105.1) | 35.6 (96.1) | 31.3 (88.3) | 27.8 (82.0) | 36.3 (97.3) |
| Daily mean °C (°F) | 19.4 (66.9) | 22.6 (72.7) | 26.5 (79.7) | 30.4 (86.7) | 33.4 (92.1) | 34.9 (94.8) | 35.8 (96.4) | 35.5 (95.9) | 33.1 (91.6) | 28.3 (82.9) | 23.9 (75.0) | 20.2 (68.4) | 28.7 (83.7) |
| Mean daily minimum °C (°F) | 10.6 (51.1) | 13.5 (56.3) | 17.6 (63.7) | 21.5 (70.7) | 24.4 (75.9) | 25.3 (77.5) | 26.7 (80.1) | 26.8 (80.2) | 23.9 (75.0) | 19.3 (66.7) | 15.3 (59.5) | 11.7 (53.1) | 19.7 (67.5) |
| Record low °C (°F) | 1.0 (33.8) | 2.0 (35.6) | 6.0 (42.8) | 11.0 (51.8) | 15.0 (59.0) | 18.0 (64.4) | 20.0 (68.0) | 20.0 (68.0) | 14.5 (58.1) | 9.0 (48.2) | 4.3 (39.7) | 1.0 (33.8) | 1.0 (33.8) |
| Average precipitation mm (inches) | 1.1 (0.04) | 1.6 (0.06) | 17.1 (0.67) | 18.3 (0.72) | 4.5 (0.18) | 4.2 (0.17) | 5.1 (0.20) | 7.0 (0.28) | 2.3 (0.09) | 1.6 (0.06) | 0.9 (0.04) | 1.2 (0.05) | 64.9 (2.56) |
| Average precipitation days (≥ 1.0 mm) | 0.3 | 0.3 | 1.6 | 1.8 | 0.7 | 0.3 | 0.7 | 0.9 | 0.3 | 0.2 | 0.1 | 0.1 | 7.4 |
| Average relative humidity (%) | 33 | 32 | 30 | 31 | 18 | 14 | 17 | 17 | 18 | 22 | 30 | 39 | 25 |
Source 1: NOAA
Source 2: Deutscher Wetterdienst (humidity, 1985–1989)

== See also ==
- Provinces of Saudi Arabia
- List of governorates of Saudi Arabia
- List of cities and towns in Saudi Arabia
