= Sharurah Domestic Airport =

Airport in Sharurah, Saudi Arabia

Sharurah Domestic Airport مطار شرورة المحلي
- IATA: SHW; ICAO: OESH

Summary
- Airport type: Public / Military
- Owner: General Authority of Civil Aviation
- Operator: General Authority of Civil Aviation
- Serves: Sharurah Governorate
- Location: Sharurah, Najran Province, Saudi Arabia
- Opened: 1972; 54 years ago
- Elevation AMSL: 2,363 ft (720 m)
- Coordinates: 17°28′00″N 047°07′17″E

Map
- Location of airport in Saudi Arabia

Runways
Direction	Length		Surface
Direction	m	ft	Surface
08/26	3,650	11,975	Asphalt

Sharurah Domestic Airport (IATA: SHW, ICAO: OESH) is an airport serving Sharurah, a governorate in Najran Province, Saudi Arabia.

== Facilities ==
The airport resides at an elevation of 2,363 feet (720 m) above mean sea level. It has one runway designated 08/26 with an asphalt surface measuring 3,650 by 45 metres (11,975 ft × 148 ft).

== Airlines and destinations ==
These are the following Airlines that offering scheduled passenger service:

Airlines	Destinations
Flynas	Abha
Saudia	Jeddah, Riyadh, Taif

== See also ==
- Transport in Saudi Arabia
- List of airports in Saudi Arabia
