= Third Saudi state =

Contemporary state of Saudi Arabia

Third Saudi state الدَّولةُ السُّعوديَّة الثالثة (Arabic)
- Flag Emblem
- Motto: لا إله إلا الله، محمد رسول الله; Lā ilāha illa allāh, Muḥammadun rasūlu allāh "There is no god but Allah, Muhammad is the Messenger of God" (Note: The Shahādah (Statement of faith) is sometimes translated into English as 'There is no god but Allah', using the romanization of the Arabic word Allāh instead of its translation. The word Allāh (Arabic: اللَّٰه) literally translates as God.) (shahada)
- Anthem: النشيد الوطني السعودي "an-Našīd al-Waṭaniyy as-Suʿūdiyy" "National Anthem of Saudi Arabia"
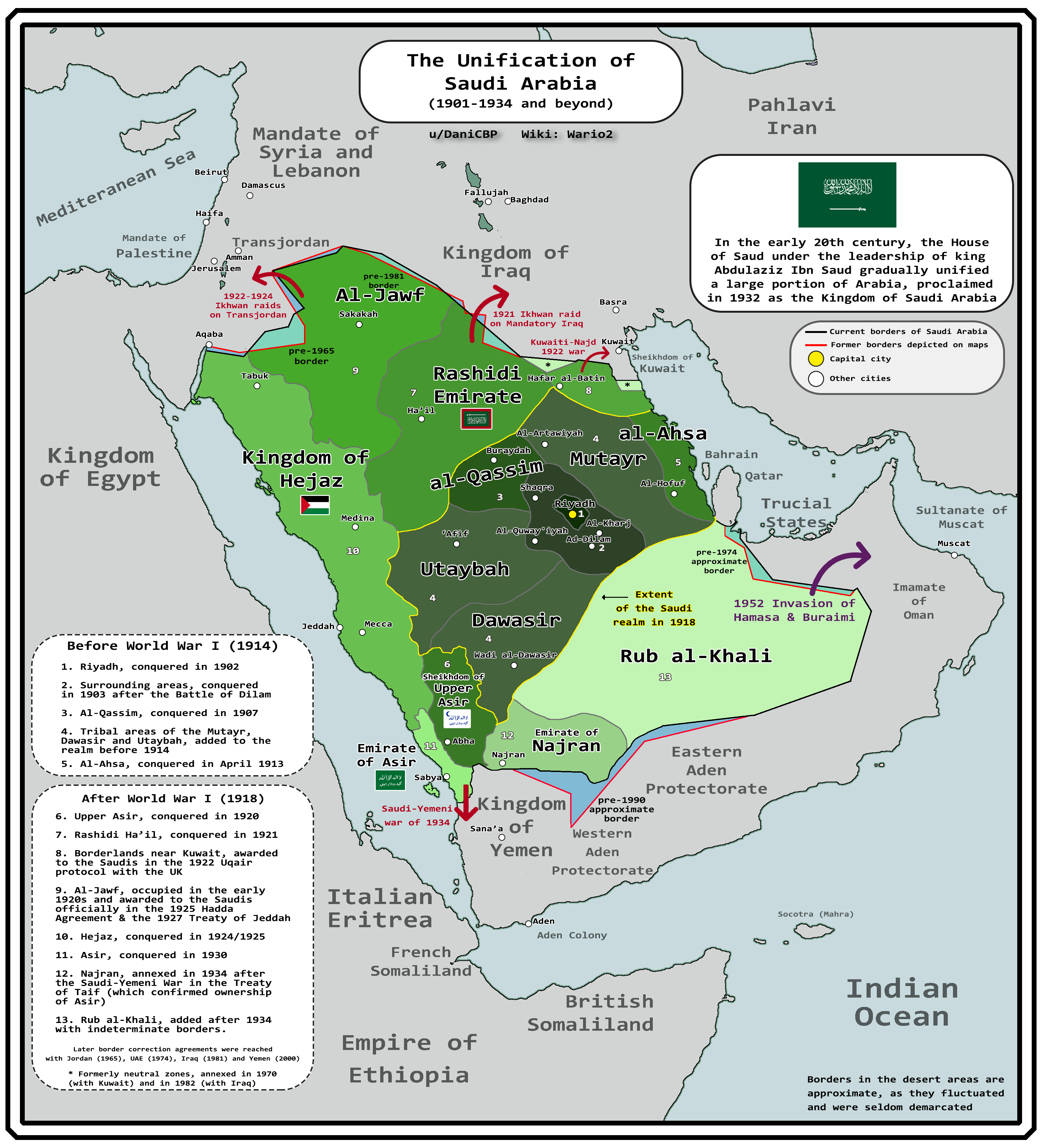
- Capital and largest city: Riyadh; 24°39′N 46°46′E
- Official languages: Arabic
- Common languages: Arabic
- Religion: Sunni Islam (official)
- Demonyms: Saudi; Saudi Arabian
- Government: Islamic absolute monarchy
- History
  - First iteration: 13 January 1902
  - Second iteration: April 1913
  - Third iteration: 2 November 1921
  - Fourth iteration: 8 January 1926
  - Saudi Arabia established: 23 September 1932
Preceded by
Emirate of Jabal Shammar
Kingdom of Hejaz
Emirate of Asir
Kingdom of Yemen
Principality of Najran
Sheikdom of Upper Asir

The third Saudi state is the current Saudi state and successor to the two earlier states: the first and the second, founded by Abdul Aziz bin Abdul Rahman (also known as "Ibn Saud"), who managed to capture the city of Riyadh on January 13, 1902. A long series of conflicts and conquests ultimately led to the establishment of the modern and contemporary Saudi state, the Kingdom of Saudi Arabia.

The third Saudi state was known at the beginning of its reign as "the Emirate of Riyadh" (1902–1913) and "the Emirate of Nejd and Hasa" (1913–1921). After the overthrow of the rival Emirate of Ha'il, which gave the Emirate of Najd and Al-Ahsa control of the entire Nejd region, it became known as the Sultanate of Nejd. Abdul Aziz conquered the Kingdom of Hejaz in 1925. He raised Nejd to a kingdom in 1927, and his dominions became known as the Kingdom of Hejaz and Nejd and its annexes. Abdul Aziz administered the two portions of his dual kingdom separately until the annexation of the Southern Territory and the announcement of the establishment of the Kingdom of Saudi Arabia in 1932.

== History ==
=== Emirate of Riyadh ===
The Emirate of Riyadh (Note: Arabic: إمارة الرياض) was the first iteration of the third Saudi state from 1902 to 1913. It was a monarchy led by the House of Saud. The state was formed after Saudi forces seized Riyadh from the control of the Emirate of Jabal Shammar, led by the House of Rashid, during the Battle of Riyadh. It was the direct antecedent of the Emirate of Nejd and Hasa, and the earliest legal predecessor of present-day Saudi Arabia. Al-Hasa was conquered in 1913.

=== Emirate of Nejd and Hasa ===
The Emirate of Nejd and Hasa (Note: Arabic: إمارة نجد والأحساء) was the second iteration of the third Saudi state from 1913 to 1921. It was a monarchy led by the House of Saud. The state was formed after Saudi forces seized al-Hasa from the control of the Ottoman Empire garrison, during the Conquest of al-Hasa. It was the direct antecedent of the Sultanate of Nejd, and a legal predecessor of modern-day Saudi Arabia.

=== Sultanate of Nejd ===
The Sultanate of Nejd (Note: Arabic: سلطنة نجد, Salṭanat Najd) was the third iteration of the third Saudi state, from 1921 to 1926. It was a monarchy led by the House of Saud, and a legal predecessor of modern-day Saudi Arabia. This version of the third Saudi state was created when Abdulaziz ibn Saud, Emir of Riyadh, declared himself sultan over Nejd and its dependencies. On 2 December 1922, the Nejd signed an agreement with Kuwait defining their border with each other, which would be a straight line along the 29th parallel. On 19 December 1925, the Kingdom of Hejaz surrendered to the forces of Ibn Saud, who was thereafter proclaimed king of the Hejaz on 8 January 1926 and merged his dominions into the Kingdom of Hejaz and Nejd.

=== Kingdom of Hejaz and Nejd ===
The Kingdom of Hejaz and Nejd (Note: Arabic: مملكة الحجاز ونجد, Mamlakat al-Ḥijāz wa-Najd), initially the Kingdom of Hejaz and Sultanate of Nejd (Note: Arabic: مملكة الحجاز وسلطنة نجد, Mamlakat al-Ḥijāz wa-Salṭanat Najd), was a dual monarchy ruled by Abdulaziz (Ibn Saud) following the Saudi conquest of Hejaz by the Sultanate of Nejd in 1925. It was the fourth iteration of the third Saudi state.

On 8 January 1926, Abdulaziz (Ibn Saud), the Sultan of Nejd, was crowned King of the Hejaz in the Masjid al-Haram in Mecca, and he elevated Nejd to the status of a kingdom on 29 January 1927. At the Treaty of Jeddah on 20 May 1927, Abdulaziz's realm was recognised by the United Kingdom of Great Britain and Northern Ireland, and was addressed as the Kingdom of Hejaz and Nejd.

For the next five years, Abdulaziz administered the two parts of his dual kingdom as separate units. On 23 September 1932, Abdulaziz proclaimed the union of the main Saudi dominions of al-Hasa, Qatif, Nejd and the Hejaz as the Kingdom of Saudi Arabia.

The Kingdom of Hejaz and Nejd could pursue its expansionist policy with British arms supplies because of its close relations with the United Kingdom.

In 1926, the Kingdom of Hejaz and Nejd was recognised by the Soviet Union, followed by the United States of America in 1931. By 1932, the United Kingdom, the French Third Republic, the Soviet Union, Turkey, the Imperial State of Iran, Kingdom of Italy and The Netherlands maintained legations in Jeddah; the Kingdom of Egypt maintained unofficial consular representatives.

== See also ==
- History of Saudi Arabia
- Unification of Saudi Arabia
- Sheikhdom of Diriyah
- Emirate of Diriyah
- Emirate of Nejd
- Emirate of Nejd and Hasa
- Emirate of Jabal Shammar
- Kingdom of Hejaz
- Kingdom of Hejaz and Nejd
