= Timeline of the 2011–2012 Saudi Arabian protests (May–December 2011) =

2011–2012 Saudi Arabian protests
- Part of Qatif conflict and the Arab Spring
- Date: 11 March 2011 – 24 December 2012 (1 year, 11 months and 3 days)
- Location: Saudi Arabia; 24.65°N 46.767°E
- Caused by: Prisoners held without trial; Inequality for women; Corruption; High unemployment; Discrimination against Shias; Saudi troops intervention in Bahrain; Inspiration from concurrent regional protests; Arrest of Nimr al-Nimr
- Goals: Political and economic changes; Women's suffrage; Women's right to drive; Release of political prisoners; Deportation of Peninsula Shield Force from Bahrain; Equality for Shias; Constitution and independent legislative assembly in Eastern Province; Release of Nimr al-Nimr
- Methods: Demonstrations; Self-immolation; Internet activism
- Status: Saudi government victory; Occasional protests since 2013
- Concessions: US$130,000,000,000 to benefit citizens; Municipal elections held on 29 September 2011; Women to participate in 2015 municipal elections and be nominated to Consultative Assembly; Partial shift from imprisonment without trial to imprisonment with trial; King Khalid University president fired on 1 July 2012

Parties
(Saudi Arabia) Saudi Arabian opposition groups show all (9): Coalition for Freedom and Justice; Women to drive movement; Saudi Civil and Political Rights Association; Human Rights First Society; Asharq Center for Human Rights; Committee for the Defense of Human Rights in the Arabian Peninsula; Society for Development and Change; Association for the Protection and Defense of Women's Rights in Saudi Arabia; Umma Islamic Party; support by: United States Iran	(Saudi Arabia) Saudi Arabian government: Mabahith

Lead figures
(Saudi Arabia) Human Rights Defenders show all (3): (Saudi Arabia) Manal al-Sharif (Co-founder of Women to drive movement); (Saudi Arabia) Mohammad Fahad al-Qahtani (Leader and co-founder of the Saudi Civil and Political Rights Association); Wajeha al-Huwaider (Co-founder of The Association for the Protection and Defense of Women's Rights in Saudi Arabia); (Saudi Arabia) Independent Opposition leaders: (Saudi Arabia) Faisal Ahmed Abdul-Ahad (Facebook Activist); (Saudi Arabia) Nimr al-Nimr (executed) (Sheikh); (Saudi Arabia) Hatoon al-Fassi (Female suffrage activist); (Saudi Arabia) Morsi al-Rebh † (Shia Activist)	King Abdullah; King of Saudi Arabia; Prince Salman; Crown Prince of Saudi Arabia; Prince Nayef; Crown Prince of Saudi Arabia (until June 2012); Prince Muhammad; Interior Minister

Number
Protesters:	Thousands
Online campaign:	26,000

Casualties and losses
Deaths:	36
Injuries:	100+
Arrests:	Riyadh: 50; East Province: 952
Deaths:	13 identified
Injuries:	Unknown

The following is a timeline of the 2011–2012 Saudi Arabian protests from May to December 2011. The 2011–2012 Saudi Arabian protests are a series of ongoing protests taking place in Saudi Arabia, which began in January 2011, influenced by concurrent protests in the region.

In May and June, motivated by the Arab Spring, Manal al-Sharif and other women organised a women's right-to-drive campaign, with the main action to take place on 17 June. Al-Sharif drove a car in May and was detained on 22 May and from 23‒30 May. Other women also drove cars, including actress Wajnat Rahbini, who was arrested after driving in Jeddah on 4 June and released a day later. From 17 June to late June, about seventy cases of women driving were documented. In late September, Shaima Jastania was sentenced to 10 lashes for driving in Jeddah, shortly after King Abdullah announced women's participation in the 2015 municipal elections and eligibility as Consultative Assembly members. King Abdullah cancelled the sentence.

Protests in the Qatif region continued in October; police shot live ammunition at protestors. The protestors called for Eastern Province to have its own constitution and legislative assembly, and for their association Society for Development and Change to be legally registered. In late November, Nasser al-Mheishi, Ali al-Felfel, Munib al-Sayyed al-'Adnan and Ali Abdullah al-Qarairis were shot dead by security forces in the Qatif region in successive protests and funerals.

Hundreds of people protested in Riyadh and Buraidah in December, calling for the release or trial of prisoners.

== May ==
Street protests in and near Qatif and the beginning of a women's driving campaign took place in May 2011.

During the second week of May 2011, a woman inspired by the Arab Spring, Najla Hariri, started driving a car in Jeddah despite a de facto ban on women driving. She stated, "Before in Saudi, you never heard about protests. [But] after what has happened in the Middle East, we started to accept a group of people going outside and saying what they want in a loud voice, and this has had an impact on me." On 21 May, Manal al-Sharif, a women's rights activist who helped start a women's right to drive campaign, was detained for six hours after a video showing her driving in Khobar in the Eastern Province, filmed by another women's rights activist, Wajeha al-Huwaider, gained widespread popularity on YouTube and Facebook. Al-Sharif was detained again from 22 May to 30 May, when she was released on bail, on the conditions of returning for questioning if requested, not driving and not talking to the media. The New York Times and Associated Press associated the long duration of al-Sharif's detention with Saudi authorities' fear of protests. On 23 May, another woman was detained for driving a car. She drove with two women passengers in Ar Rass and was detained by traffic police in the presence of the religious police (CPVPV). She was released after signing a statement that she would not drive again. In reaction to al-Sharif's arrest, several more Saudi women published videos of themselves driving during the following days.

== June ==
The women's driving campaign continued in June.

Wajnat Rahbini, a Saudi actress famous in the Arab world for playing in the satirical comedy Tash ma Tash, broadcast annually during Ramadan, drove her car "in defiance of a long-standing ban on female driving" on 4 June in Jeddah. She was detained after exiting her car and released the following day without bail.

On 17 June, the main date for the women's driving campaign, about 30 to 40 women drove cars in towns around Saudi Arabia, including Maha al-Qahtani and Eman al-Nafjan in Riyadh, and other women in Jeddah and Dammam. When she drove for a second time the same day, al-Qahtani was given a ticket for driving without a Saudi Arabian licence. The Guardian interpreted the lack of arrests as a deliberate change in government policy, stating, "police appeared to be under orders not to intervene."

== October ==
On 4 October, there was a firefight between unidentified gunmen and Saudi security personnel in Qatif, injuring between 11 police and at least 3 civilians. The government blamed "a foreign country", presumably Iran, for the unrest.

This confrontation grew out of a conflict in Awamiyah, a predominantly Shi'a town in the Qatif district, when security forces arrested a 60-year-old man to force his son, who was active in a movement to force Saudi Arabia to withdraw from Bahrain, to give himself up. Molotov cocktails were thrown at the police station. The protestors want a constitution and an independent legislative assembly for the Eastern Province and for the Society for Development and Change to be legally registered.

== November ==
On 20, 21 and 23 November, five people, Nasser al-Mheishi, Ali al-Felfel, Munib al-Sayyed al-'Adnan and Ali Abdullah al-Qarairis were killed and six others were wounded by police bullets during a protest in Qatif, the funeral for al-Muhaishi, and a follow-up protest for the deaths of al-Muhaishi and al-Filfil.

== December ==
On 16 December, about 100 people, mostly women, protested in Riyadh and Buraidah demanding that prisoners be released or tried. About 50 people were arrested in the two cities. Many were released by 23 December. On 23 December, a nationwide mosque sit-in protest again took place in cities including Riyadh and Jeddah, calling for the release of Dr. Yusuf al-Ahmad, imprisoned after having sent a Twitter message in support of prisoners' families. The protestors said that there are 30,000 political prisoners, mostly prisoners of conscience in Saudi Arabia. Thirty men and thirty women among the Riyadh protestors were arrested. Most were released by 28 December.
