= Legal system of Saudi Arabia =

The legal system of Saudi Arabia is based on Sharia, Islamic law derived from the Quran and the Sunnah (the traditions) of the Islamic prophet Muhammad. The sources of Sharia also include Islamic scholarly consensus developed after Muhammad's death. Its interpretation by judges in Saudi Arabia is influenced by the medieval texts of the literalist Hanbali school of Fiqh. Uniquely in the Muslim world, Sharia has been adopted by Saudi Arabia in an uncodified form. This, and the lack of judicial precedent, has resulted in considerable uncertainty in the scope and content of the country's laws. The government therefore announced its intention to codify Sharia in 2010, and, in 2018, a sourcebook of legal principles and precedents was published by the Saudi government. Sharia has also been supplemented by regulations issued by royal decree covering modern issues such as intellectual property and corporate law. Nevertheless, Sharia remains the primary source of law, especially in areas such as criminal, family, commercial and contract law, and the Qur'an and the Sunnah are declared to be the country's constitution. In the areas of land and energy law the extensive proprietorial rights of the Saudi state (in effect, the Saudi royal family) constitute a significant feature.

The current Saudi court system was created by King Abdul Aziz, who founded the Kingdom of Saudi Arabia in 1932, and was introduced to the country in stages between 1927 and 1960. It comprises general and summary Sharia courts, with some administrative tribunals to deal with disputes on specific modern regulations. Trials in Saudi Arabia are bench trials. Courts in Saudi Arabia observe few formalities and the country's first criminal procedure code, issued in 2001, has been largely ignored. King Abdullah, in 2007, introduced a number of significant judicial reforms, although they are yet to be fully implemented.

Criminal law punishments in Saudi Arabia include beheading, stoning, amputation and lashing. Serious criminal offences include not only internationally recognized crimes such as murder, rape, theft and robbery, but also apostasy, adultery, witchcraft and sorcery. In addition to the regular police force, Saudi Arabia has a secret police, the Mabahith, and "religious police", the Mutawa. The latter enforces Islamic social and moral norms, but their powers have greatly been restricted over the last few years. Western-based human rights organizations, such as Amnesty International and Human Rights Watch, have criticized the activities of both the Mabahith and the Mutawa, as well as a number of other aspects of human rights in Saudi Arabia. These include the number of executions, the range of offences which are subject to the death penalty, the lack of safeguards for the accused in the criminal justice system, the treatment of homosexuals, the use of torture, the lack of religious freedom, and the highly disadvantaged position of women. The Albert Shanker Institute and Freedom House have also reported that "Saudi Arabia's practices diverge from the concept of the rule of law."

== History ==
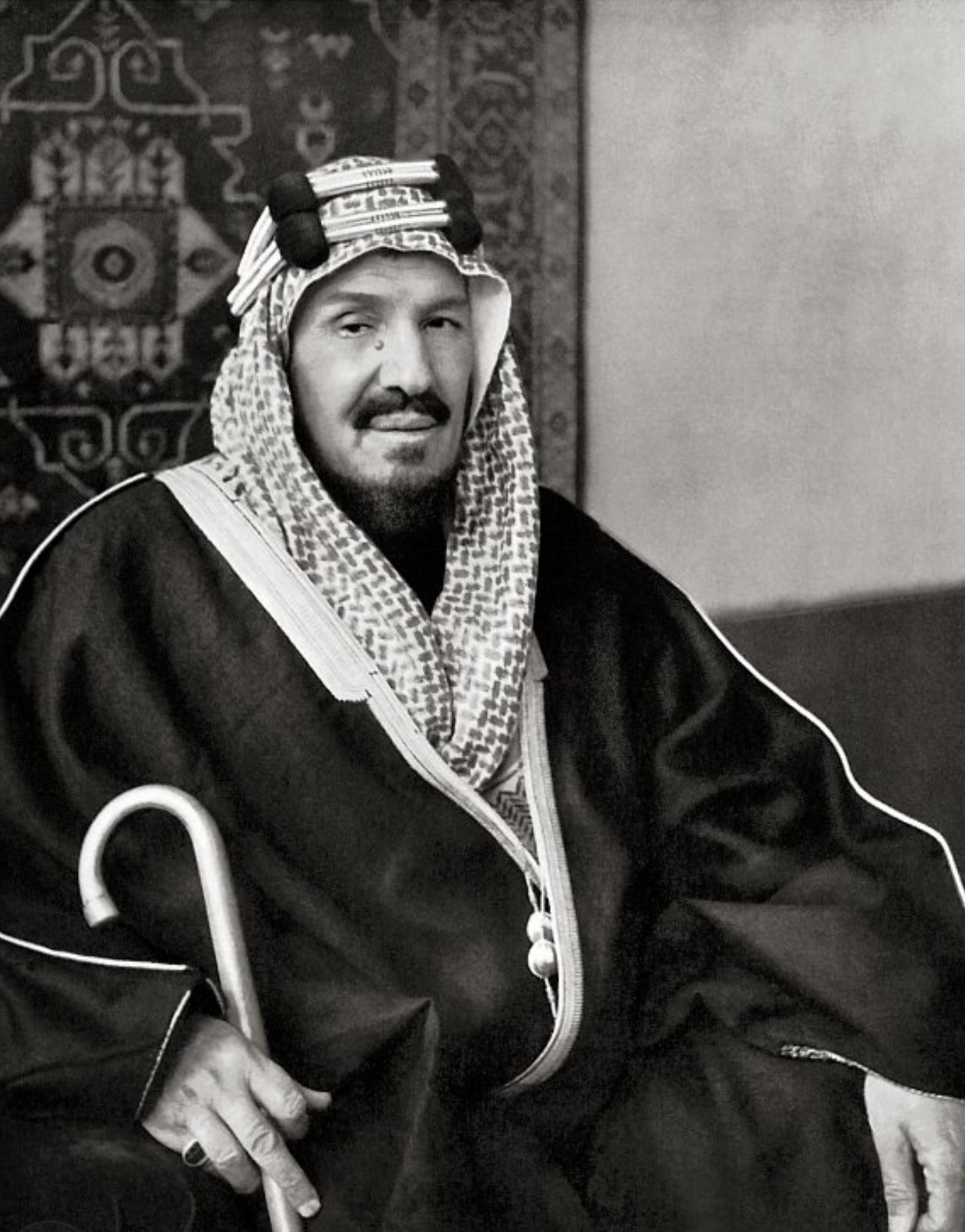
Abdul Aziz Al Saud, first king of Saudi Arabia, and founder of the country's court system.

Sharia (or Islamic law), the primary source of law in modern Saudi Arabia, was developed gradually by Muslim judges and scholars between the seventh and tenth centuries. From the time of the Abbasid Caliphate in the 8th century, the developing Sharia was accepted as the basis of law in the towns of the Muslim world, including the Arabian Peninsula, and upheld by local rulers, eclipsing urf (or pre-Islamic local customary law). In the rural areas, urf continued to be predominant for some time, and, for instance, was the main source of law among the bedouin of Nejd in central Arabia until the early 20th century.

By the 11th century, the Muslim world had developed four major Sunni schools of Islamic jurisprudence (or fiqh), each with its own interpretations of Sharia: Hanbali, Maliki, Shafi and Hanafi. In Arabia, the Hanbali school was preferred by the Wahhabi movement, founded in the 18th century. Wahhabism, a strict form of Sunni Islam, was supported by the Saudi royal family (the Al Saud) and is now dominant in Saudi Arabia. From the 18th century, the Hanbali school therefore predominated in Nejd and central Arabia, the heartland of Wahhabi Islam. In the more cosmopolitan Hejaz, in the west of the peninsula, both the Hanafi and Shafi schools were followed.

Similarly, different court systems existed. In Nejd, there was a simple system of single judges for each of the major towns. The judge was appointed by the local governor, with whom he worked closely to dispose of cases. In the Hejaz, there was a more sophisticated system, with courts comprising panels of judges. In 1925, Abdul Aziz Al Saud of Nejd conquered the Hejaz and united it with his existing territories to form the Kingdom of Saudi Arabia in 1932. In 1927, the king introduced a new court system to the Hejaz comprising general and summary courts and ordered that Hanbali fiqh should be used. However, Nejd's traditional system of judges was left in place in the face of conservative opposition from the Nejd religious establishment.

After becoming familiar with the Hejaz court system in the following decades, the religious establishment allowed its introduction to the rest of the country between 1957 and 1960. Additionally, from the 1930s, Abdul Aziz created government tribunals or "committees" to adjudicate in areas covered by royal decrees such as commercial or labor law. The system of Sharia courts and government tribunals created by Abdul Aziz largely remained in place until the 2007 judiciary reforms (see below). Until 1970, the judiciary was the responsibility of the Grand Mufti, the country's most senior religious authority. When the incumbent Grand Mufti died in 1969, however, the then king, Faisal decided not to appoint a successor and took the opportunity to transfer responsibility to the newly established Ministry of Justice.

The Shia community of the Eastern province have a separate legal tradition. Although they follow Sharia, they apply the Shia Jafari school of jurisprudence to it. In 1913, when Abdul Aziz conquered the area, he granted the Shias a separate judiciary for dealing with religious and family law cases: one judge in Qatif, and one in Al-Hasa. This remained the position, with the two judges ministering to a population of around two million, until 2005 when the number of judges was increased to seven. For all other areas of law, the Shia community are under the jurisdiction of the regular Sunni courts.

== Sources of law ==
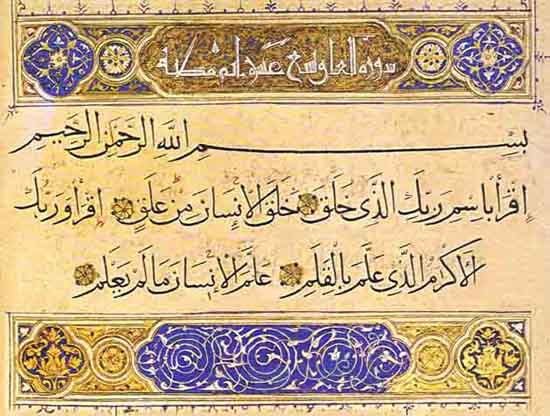
Verses from the Quran, a primary source of the law of Saudi Arabia.

The primary source of law in Saudi Arabia is the Islamic Sharia. Sharia is derived from the Qur'an and the traditions of Muhammad contained in the Sunnah; ijma, or scholarly consensus on the meaning of the Qur'an and the Sunnah developed after Muhammad's death; and qiyas, or analogical reasoning applied to the principles of the Qur'an, Sunnah and ijma. Officially, Sharia, in Saudi Arabia, is generally applied in accordance with the Hanbali legal school of thought (or madhhab), which only allows qiyas when absolutely necessary. The Saudi royal family and state are proponents of the Wahhabi Islamic movement which generally follows the Hanbali school. However, opponents of Wahhabism have noted that Wahhabi beliefs, as practised in Saudi Arabia, diverge from the Hanbali school in certain respects and, even, that Wahhabism may constitute a separate school or madhhab.

Muslim countries that retain or adopt Sharia usually determine which parts of the Sharia are enforceable and codify (and thereby modernize) them. Unlike other Muslim countries, Saudi Arabia regards uncodified Sharia in its entirety as the law of the land and does not interfere with it. It is, therefore, unique not only when compared to Western systems, but also in comparison to other Muslim countries, and according to the Dutch legal scholar, Jan Michiel Otto, could be described as the closest system in the modern world to the form of Sharia adopted at the advent of Islam.

The lack of codification of Sharia leads to considerable variation in its interpretation and application. Furthermore, there is no system of judicial precedent, as Saudi judges are forbidden from engaging in taqlid (or the unquestioning adoption of the interpretation of others) and must, instead, use independent reasoning (ijtihad). Nevertheless, judges are expected to consult six medieval texts from the Hanbali school of jurisprudence before reaching a decision. The Hanbali school is noted for its literalist interpretation of the Qur'an and hadith. If the answer is not found in the six Hanbali texts, the judge may then consult the jurisprudence of the other three main Sunni schools or apply his independent judgment and legal reasoning through ijtihad.

Because the judge is empowered to disregard previous judgments (either his own or of other judges) and can apply his personal interpretation of Sharia to any particular case through ijtihad, divergent judgements arise even in apparently identical cases. There is a presumption against overturning a decision when it is based on ijtihad. This principle is crucial in two respects. Firstly, it concentrates the substance of the law in the hands of judges as, in consequence, there is a presumption that only a judge exercising ijtihad, rather than a king or a parliament, can determine God's law. Secondly, it renders a judge's decision practically immune to reversal on appeal. The role of ijtihad has led to calls for the Sharia to be codified to give clarity and remove uncertainty. As a result, in 2010, the Minister of Justice announced plans to implement a codification of Sharia law, although resistance from the religious establishment is reportedly delaying its implementation.

Royal decrees (nizam) are the other main source of law but are referred to as regulations rather than laws to indicate that they are subordinate to the Sharia. Royal decrees supplement Sharia in areas such as labor, commercial and corporate law. Additionally, other forms of regulations (lai'hah) include Royal Orders, Council of Ministers Resolutions, Ministerial Resolutions and, Ministerial Circulars, and are similarly subordinate to Sharia. Any Western commercial laws or institutions are adapted and interpreted from the standpoint of Shariah law.

Additionally, traditional tribal law and custom remain significant. For example, judges will enforce tribal customs pertaining to marriage and divorce.

== The courts and the judiciary ==
=== Court structure ===
The Sharia court system constitutes the basic judiciary of Saudi Arabia and its judges and lawyers form part of the ulema, the country's religious leadership. There are also extra-Sharia government tribunals which handle disputes relating to specific royal decrees and since 2008, specialist courts, including the Board of Grievances and the Specialized Criminal Court. Final appeal from both Sharia courts and government tribunals is to the King and as of 2007, all courts and tribunals followed Sharia rules of evidence and procedure.

The Sharia courts have general jurisdiction over most civil and criminal cases. At present, there are two types of courts of first instance: general courts and summary courts dealing with lesser cases. Cases are adjudicated by single judges, except criminal cases if the potential sentence is death, amputation or stoning when there is a panel of three judges. There are also two courts for the Shia minority in the Eastern Province dealing with family and religious matters. Appellate courts sit in Mecca and Riyadh and review decisions for compliance with Sharia. The Supreme Judicial Council of Saudi Arabia supervises the lower courts and provides legal opinions and advice to the King and reviews sentences of death, stoning, and amputation.

There are also non-Sharia courts covering specialized areas of law, the most important of which is the Board of Grievances. This court was originally created to deal with complaints against the government, but as of 2010 also has jurisdiction over commercial and some criminal cases, such as bribery and forgery, and acts as a court of appeal for a number of non-Sharia government tribunals. These administrative tribunals, referred to as "committees", deal with specific issues regulated by royal decrees, such as labor and commercial law.

=== Judges ===
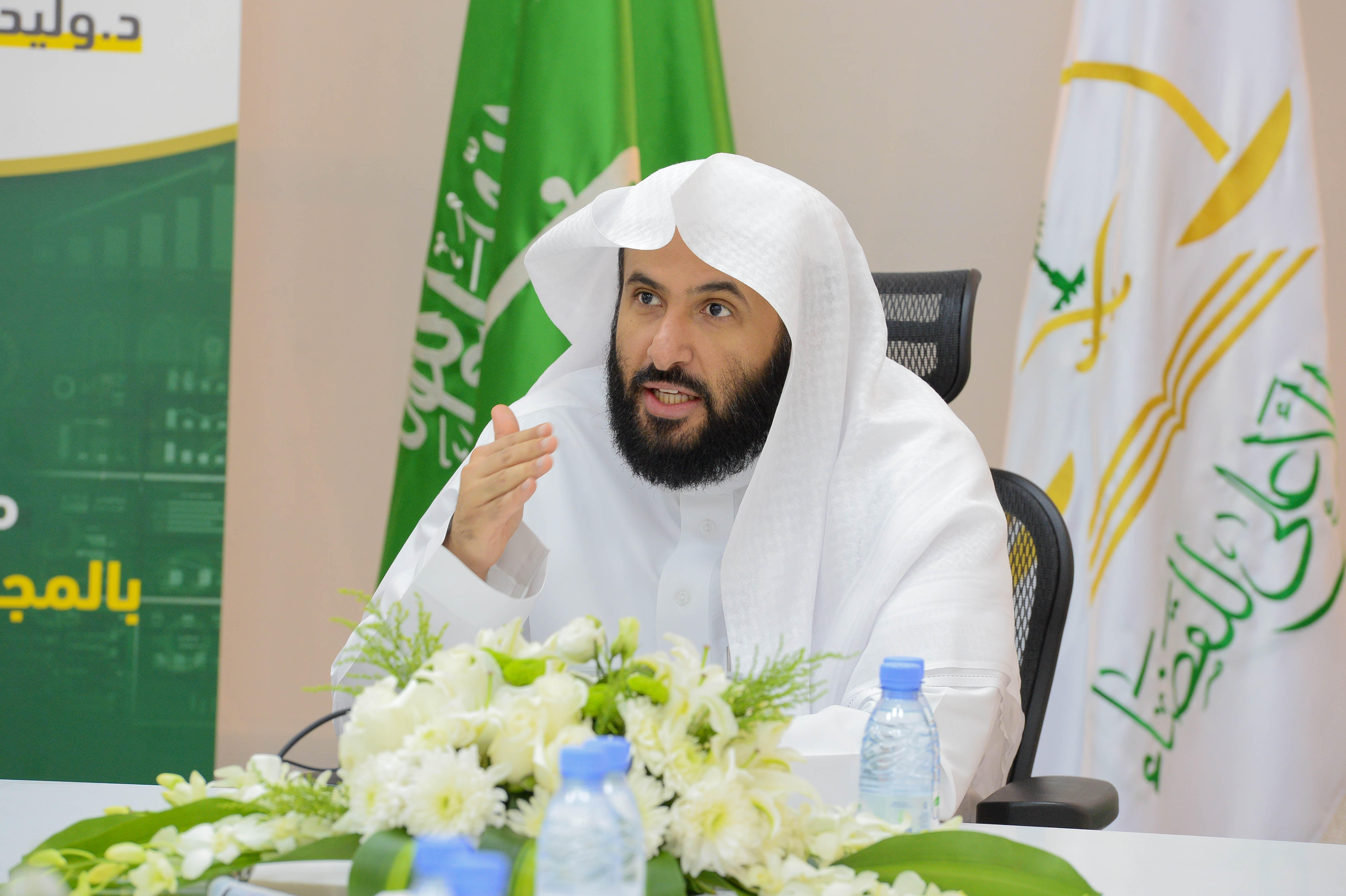
Walid bin Mohammed Al Samani, current Justice Minister since 2015

The judicial establishment, in the broadest sense, is composed of qadis, who give binding judgements in specific court cases, and muftis and other members of the ulema, who issue generalized but highly influential legal opinions (fatwas). The Grand Mufti is the most senior member of the judicial establishment as well as being the highest religious authority in the country; his opinions are highly influential among the Saudi judiciary. The judiciary proper (that is, the body of qadis) is composed of about 700 judges, a relatively small number (according to critics) for a country of over 23 million.

Qadis generally have degrees in Sharia law from an Islamic university recognized by the Saudi government with, in many cases, a post-graduate qualification from the Institute of Higher Judiciary in Riyadh. The training received from such Sharia law degrees is entirely religious in character and is based on the Qur'an and centuries old religious treatises with no reference to, for example, modern commercial issues. Although most judges have been educated and appointed under the current system, some of the older judges received the traditional qadi's training of years of instruction by a religious mentor in a mosque.

The capabilities and reactionary nature of the judges have been criticized. The main complaint reportedly made by Saudis privately is that judges, who have wide discretion in interpreting the Sharia, have no knowledge, and are often contemptuous, of the modern world. Reported examples of judges' attitudes include rulings banning such things as the children's game Pokémon, telephones that play recorded music, and sending flowers to hospital patients. Saudi judges come from a narrow recruitment pool. By one estimate, 80% of the 600+ Saudi judges and almost all senior judges come from Qasim, a province in the center of the country with less than 5% of Saudi's population, but known as the strict religious Wahhabi heartland of Saudi Arabia. Senior judges will only allow like-minded graduates of select religious institutes to join the judiciary and will remove judges that stray away from rigidly conservative judgments.

=== Reforms and developments since 2008 ===
The Saudi system of justice has been criticized for being slow, arcane, lacking in some of the safeguards of justice and unable to deal with the modern world. In 2007, King Abdullah issued royal decrees with the aim of reforming the judiciary and creating a new court system. With the launch of labor courts on November 25, 2018, the reforms have been completed, including the creation of the Supreme Court and the transfer of the Board of Grievances' commercial and criminal jurisdictions to the general court system. The specialist first instance courts now comprise general, criminal, personal status, commercial and labor courts. The Sharia courts have therefore lost their general jurisdiction to hear all cases and the work load of the government's administrative tribunals have been transferred to the new courts. Another important change is the establishment of appeal courts for each province. It has been claimed that the reforms will establish a system for codifying Sharia and incorporating the principle of judicial precedent into court practice.

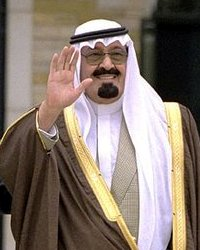
King Abdullah ordered a number of reforms of the judiciary during his reign

Significant progress has been made with the publication, on January 3, 2018, of a sourcebook of legal principles and precedents.

In 2008, the Specialized Criminal Court was created. The court tries suspected terrorists and human rights activists. On 26 June 2011, the court started trials of 85 people suspected of being involved in Al-Qaeda in the Arabian Peninsula and the 2003 Riyadh compound bombings, and in September 2011 another 41 al-Qaeda suspects appeared in the court. In the same year, the court held trial sessions of human rights activists, including Mohammed Saleh al-Bejadi, co-founder of the Saudi Civil and Political Rights Association (ACPRA) and Mubarak Zu'air, a lawyer for long-term prisoners, and a protester, Khaled al-Johani, who spoke to BBC Arabic Television at a protest in Riyadh. The court convicted 16 of the human rights activists to sentences of 5–30 years on 22 November 2011.

In 2009, the King made a number of significant changes to the judiciary's personnel at the most senior level by bringing in a younger generation. For example, as well as appointing a new Minister of Justice, a new chairman of the Supreme Judicial Council was appointed. The outgoing chairman was known to oppose the codification of Sharia. The king also appointed a new head of the Board of Grievances and Abdulrahman Al Kelya as the first chief justice of the new Supreme Court. A January 2013 royal decree ruled that the Supreme Judicial Council will be headed by the justice minister. The chief justice of the Supreme Court will also be a member.

In what is considered "one of the most significant steps of legal reform it has taken for decades", the Saudi judicial system officially released thousands of previously unpublished court cases to the public in 2015.

== Law enforcement ==
The police department of the Saudi Ministry of the Interior is divided into three forces: the regular police, secret police and the religious police.

=== Regular and secret police ===
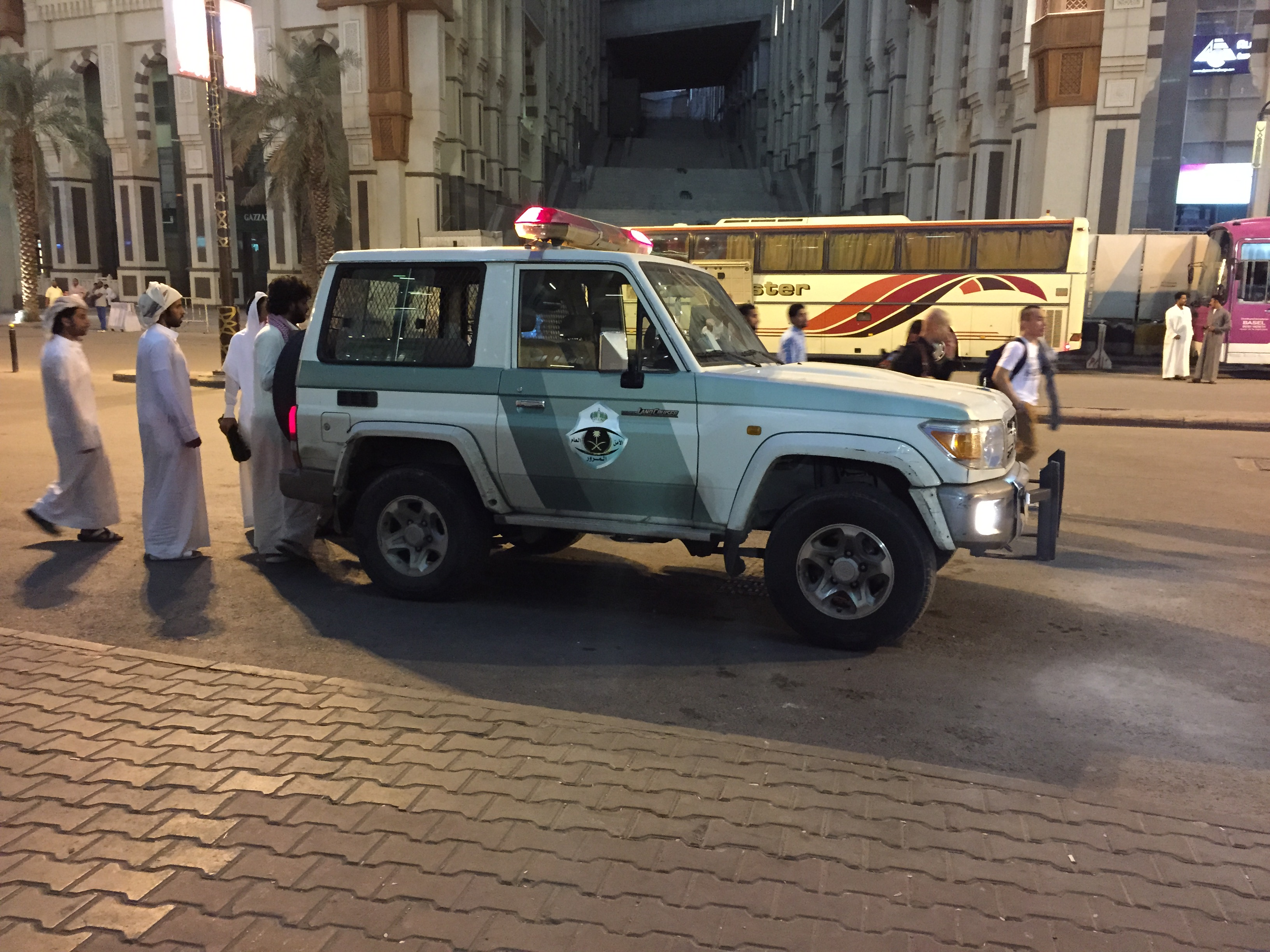
A police vehicle in Saudi Arabia

The Department of Public Safety is the official name of the regular police force and handles most day-to-day police activities. It is a highly centralized force and is usually headed by a member of the royal family. The "secret police", or Mabahith, deals with domestic security and counter-intelligence. It runs the ʽUlaysha Prison in Riyadh, where it holds its prisoners. The United Nations' Working Group on Arbitrary Detention has objected to arbitrary detention by the Mabahith at ʽUlaysha.

=== Mutawa ===
The powers of the Committee for the Promotion of Virtue and the Prevention of Vice (CPVPV), commonly known as the religious police or mutawa, were substantially curtailed in 2016. Under Council of Ministers Resolution No. 289, CPVPV members may report suspected violations to the police or other competent authorities, while powers including pursuit, detention, identity verification, interrogation, investigation and arrest are reserved to those authorities. Prior to the reforms, the committee played a prominent role in enforcing public-morality rules, including rules concerning dress and gender segregation. In its 2023 International Religious Freedom Report, the U.S. Department of State described the CPVPV's role as providing counseling and reporting suspected violations to police, and stated that its field officers did not patrol in public during that year. The committee has also been the subject of controversy. Following a 2002 school fire in Mecca in which 15 schoolgirls died, allegations were made that religious police had prevented male rescuers from entering because the girls were not veiled.

== Major areas of law ==
=== Constitutional law ===
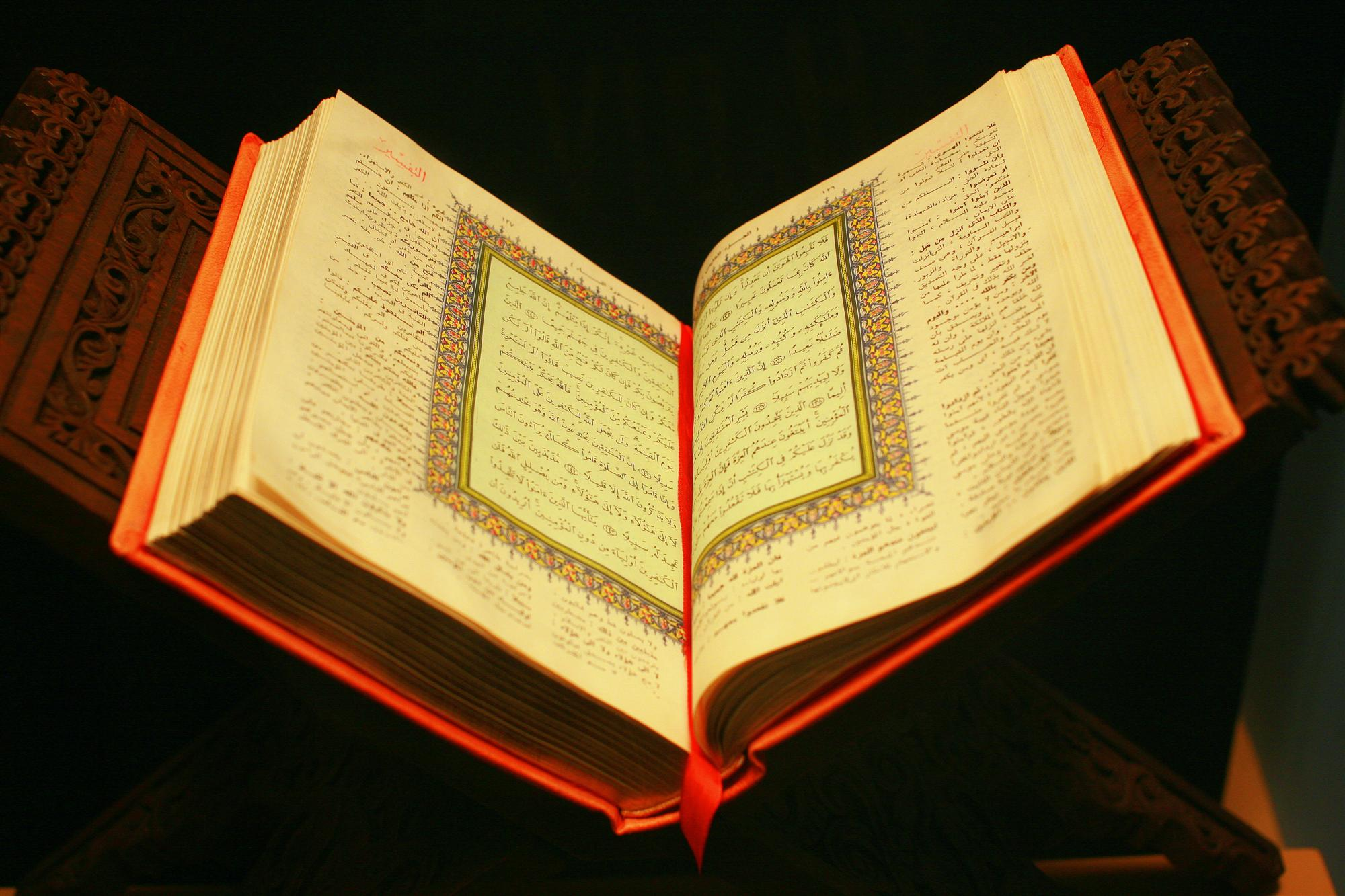
The Qur'an, declared to be Saudi Arabia's constitution

Saudi Arabia is an absolute monarchy, and has no legally binding written constitution. However, in 1992, the Basic Law of Saudi Arabia was adopted by royal decree. The Basic Law outlines the responsibilities and processes of the governing institutions but is insufficiently specific to be considered a constitution. It declares that the king must comply with Sharia (that is, Islamic law) and that the Quran and the Sunna (the traditions of Muhammad) are the country's constitution. Interpretation of the Quran and the Sunna remains necessary, and this is carried out by the ulema, the Saudi religious establishment.

The Basic Law further states:

Monarchy is the system of rule in the Kingdom of Saudi Arabia. Rulers of the country shall be from amongst the sons of the founder King Abdulaziz bin Abdulrahman Al-Faisal Al-Saud, and their descendants. The most upright among them shall receive allegiance according to Almighty God's Book and His Messenger's Sunna (Traditions)...Government in the Kingdom of Saudi Arabia derives its authority from the Book of God and the Sunna of the Prophet (PBUH), which are the ultimate sources of reference for this Law and the other laws of the State...Governance in the Kingdom of Saudi Arabia is based on justice, shura (consultation) and equality according to Islamic Sharia.

=== Criminal law ===
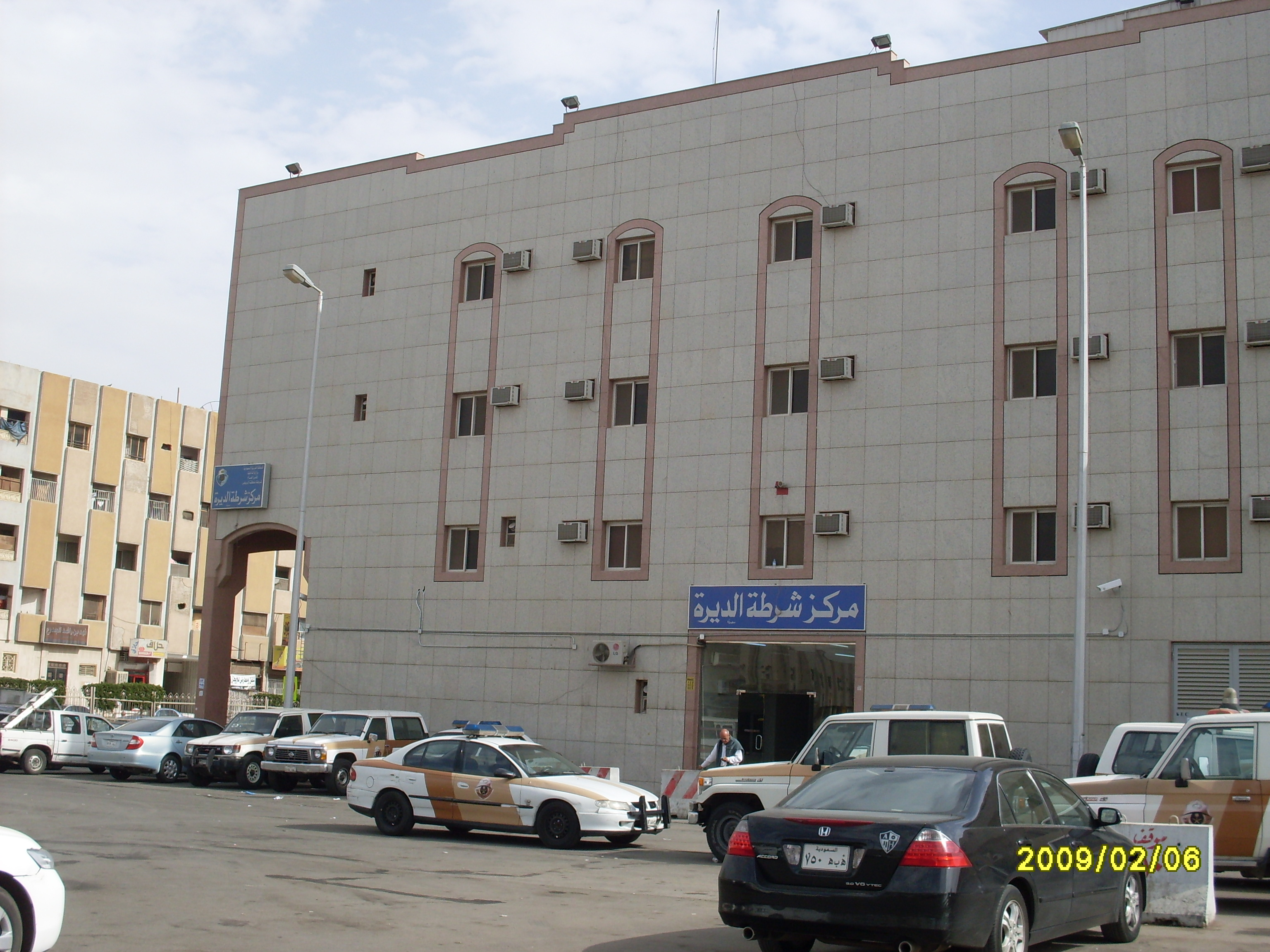
A police station in Riyadh

Saudi Arabia uses the bench trial system and few procedural formalities are observed. The country's first criminal procedure code was introduced in 2001 and contains provisions based on Egyptian and French law. Human Rights Watch, in a 2008 report, noted that judges were either ignorant of the criminal procedure code or were aware of it but routinely ignored the code.

Sharia provides the substantive criminal law and comprises three categories of crime: hudud (fixed Quranic punishments for specific crimes), Qisas (eye-for-an-eye retaliatory punishments), and Tazir, a general category. Hudud crimes are the most serious and include theft, robbery, blasphemy, apostasy, adultery, sodomy and fornication. Qisas crimes include murder or any crime involving bodily harm. Tazir represents most cases, many of which are defined by national regulations such as bribery, trafficking, and drug abuse. The most common punishment for a Tazir offence is lashing.

The Saudi courts impose a number of severe physical punishments. The death penalty can be imposed for a wide range of offences including murder, rape, armed robbery, repeated drug use, apostasy, adultery, witchcraft and sorcery and can be carried out by beheading with a sword, stoning or firing squad, followed by crucifixion. The 345 reported executions between 2007 and 2010 were all carried out by public beheading. Two executions for "witchcraft and sorcery" were carried out in 2011. There were no reports of stoning between 2007 and 2010. Stoning has, however, occurred relatively recently and, for example, between 1981 and 1992 there were four cases of execution by stoning reported. In April 2020, Saudi Arabia excluded minors who commit crimes from facing execution, but instead would get sentenced a maximum of 10 years in a juvenile detention facility.

A conviction requires proof in one of three ways. The first is an uncoerced confession. Alternatively, the testimony of two male witnesses can convict (four in the case of adultery), unless it is a hudud crime, in which case a confession is also required. Women's evidence normally carries half the weight of men in Sharia courts, however in criminal trials women's testimony is not allowed at all. Testimony from non-Muslims or Muslims whose doctrines are considered unacceptable (for example, Shia) may be discounted. Lastly, an affirmation or denial by oath (Note: The Muslim oath has no prescribed form except that it must begin "Wallahi, Wabillahi, Watallah" ("By God..."). It is not necessary to place the hand on the Qur'an, although this is often done. See Hussain, Jamila (2003). Islam: its law and society. Federation Press. p. 165. ISBN 978-1-86287-499-2. Archived from the original on 2023-01-17.) can be required. Giving an oath is taken particularly seriously in a religious society such as Saudi Arabia's, and a refusal to take an oath will be taken as an admission of guilt resulting in conviction.

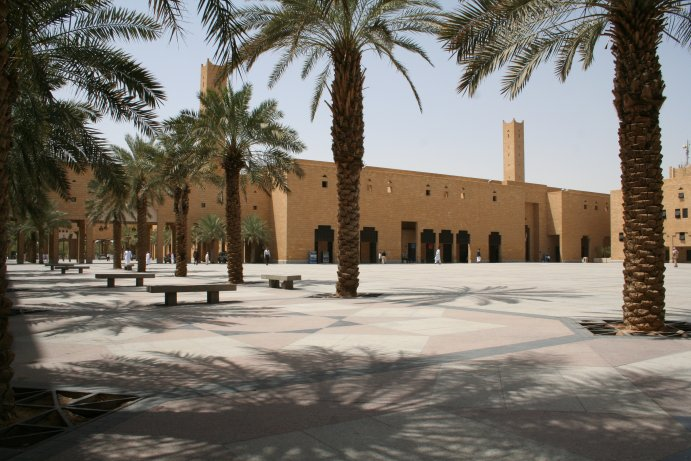
Deera Square, central Riyadh. Known locally as "Chop-chop square", it was formerly the location of public beheadings.

Although repeated theft can be punishable by amputation of the right hand and aggravated theft by the cross-amputation of a hand and a foot, only one instance of judicial amputation was reported between 2007 and 2010. Homosexual acts are punishable by flogging, imprisonment or death. Lashings are a common form of punishment and are often imposed for offences against religion and public morality such as drinking alcohol and neglect of prayer and fasting obligations. In April 2020, the Saudi Supreme Court eliminated the punishment of flogging from its court system, and replaced it by fines, jail time, or both.

Retaliatory punishments, or Qisas, are practised: for instance, an eye can be surgically removed at the insistence of a victim who lost his own eye. This occurred in a case reported in 2000. Families of someone unlawfully killed can choose between demanding the death penalty or granting clemency in return for a payment of diyya, or blood money, by the perpetrator. There has been a growing trend of exorbitant blood-money demands, for example a sum of $11 million was reported as being recently demanded. Saudi officials and religious figures have criticized this trend and said that the practise of diyya has become corrupted.

=== Family law ===
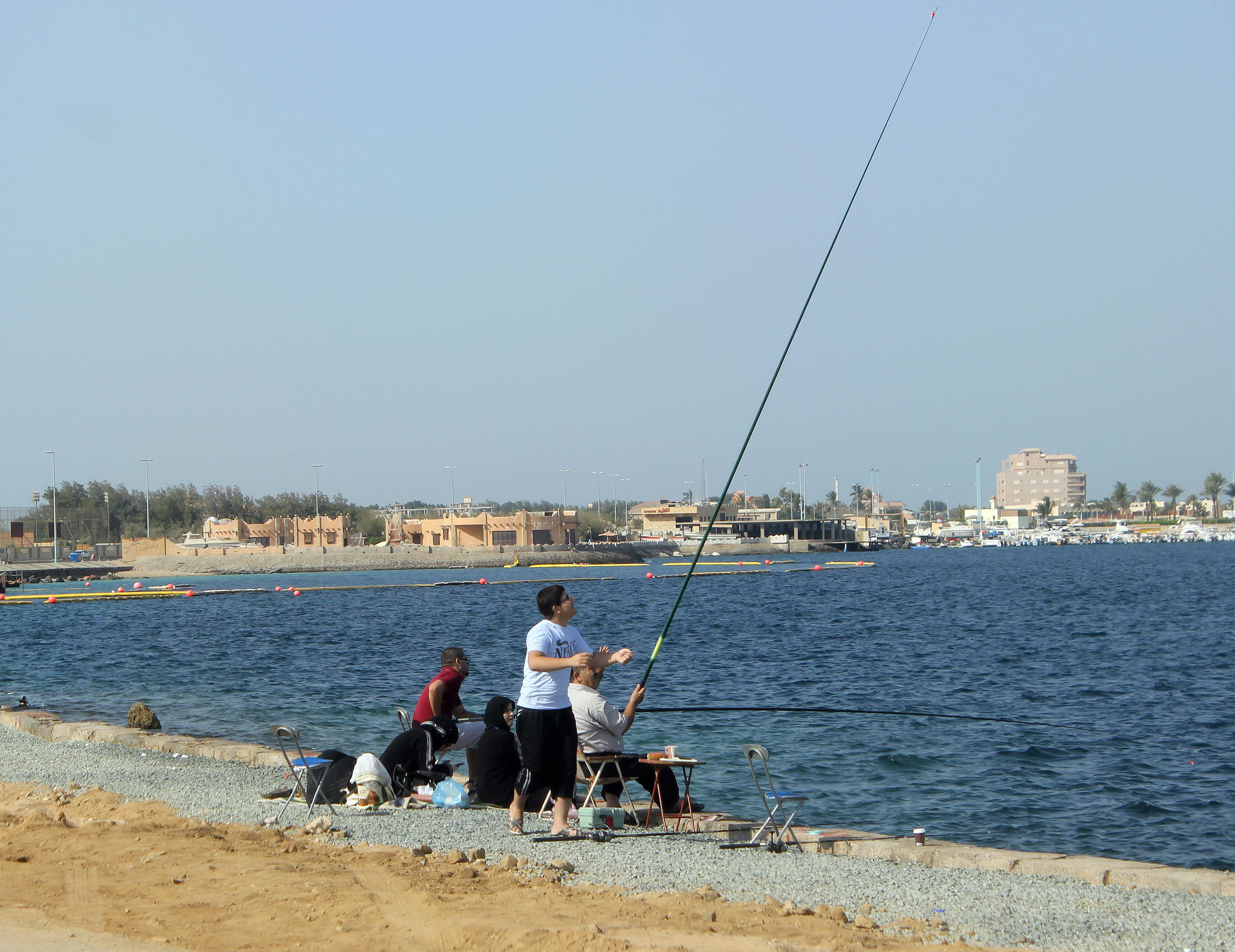
A family fishing in Jeddah

Laws relating to marriage, divorce, children and inheritance are not codified and fall within the general jurisdiction of the Sharia courts.

Polygamy is permitted for men but is limited to four wives at any one time. There is evidence that its practice has increased, particularly among the educated Hejazi elite, as a result of oil wealth. The government has promoted polygamy as part of a return to "Islamic values" program. In 2001, the Grand Mufti (the highest religious authority) issued a fatwa, or opinion, calling upon Saudi women to accept polygamy as part of the Islamic package and declaring that polygamy was necessary "to fight against...the growing epidemic of spinsterhood". In 2019, marriages under the age of 15 were banned and marriages under the age of 18 would need to be referred to specialialized courts for approval. Prior to that, there was no minimum age for marriage and the Grand Mufti reportedly had said in 2009 that girls of the age of 10 or 12 were marriageable.

Transnational marriages involving Saudis are bound by a wide range of legal requirements and restrictions with regards to age and age difference, income, occupation, family consent, and other factors. For example, most Saudis who work in government ministries and agencies are not permitted to marry non-Saudis. A Saudi man must be between the ages of 40 and 65 in order to marry a non-Saudi woman, and since 2014 Saudi men have been banned from marrying foreign women of four nationalities: Pakistan, Bangladesh, Chad, and Myanmar.

Men have a unilateral right to divorce their wives (talaq) without needing any legal justification. The divorce is effective immediately. The husband's obligation is then to provide financial support for the divorced wife for a period of four months and ten days. A woman can only obtain a divorce with the consent of her husband or judicially if her husband has harmed her. In practice, it is very difficult for a Saudi woman to obtain a judicial divorce. The divorce rate is high, with 50% of marriages being dissolved. In the event of divorce, fathers have automatic custody of sons from the age of seven and daughters from the age of nine. The right for men to marry up to four wives, combined with their ability to divorce a wife at any time without cause, can translate to unlimited polygamy. King Abdul Aziz, the founder of the country, reportedly admitted to marrying over 200 women by frequently divorcing wives and marrying new ones. However, his polygamy was considered extraordinary even by Saudi Arabian standards. In order to protect marriage, Saudi's legal system dictates any external attempts to separate a husband and wife are punishable in court as the crime of takhbib. Notably, this charge was used to prosecute women's rights activists Wajeha Al-Huwaider and Fawzia al-Oyouni for their attempts to assist Nathalie Morin — a Canadian citizen — to escape an abusive Saudi marriage.

With regard to the law of inheritance, the Quran specifies that fixed portions of the deceased's estate must be left to the so-called "Quranic heirs". Generally, female heirs receive half the portion of male heirs. A Sunni Muslim can bequeath a maximum of a third of his property to non-Quranic heirs. The residue is divided between agnatic heirs.

=== Commercial and contract law ===
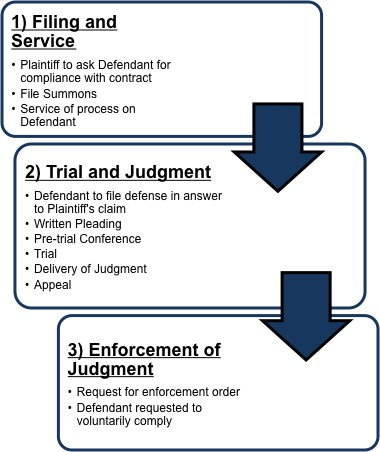
A diagram outlining the basic procedure of enforcing a contract in Saudi Arabia

Business and commerce are governed by Sharia, commercial jurisdiction rests with the Board of Grievances composed of Sharia-trained judges, but "Special Tribunals" tasked with "finding ways to circumnavigate the more restrictive aspects of Shariah Law" have been established.

For foreign investors, uncertainties around the content of commercial law, because of the Sharia aspect, constitutes a disincentive to invest in Saudi Arabia. As it is governed by Sharia, contract law is not codified. Within the general limitations of Sharia, it allows considerable freedom for the parties to agree contract terms. However, contracts involving speculation or the payment of interest are prohibited and are not enforceable. If a contract is breached, Saudi courts will only award compensation for proven direct damage. Claims for loss of profit or opportunity will not be allowed as these would constitute speculation, which is not permitted under Sharia.

As of at least 2003, the non-sharia "Special Tribunals" or "Special Committees" hear "most commercial law cases" ranging from "breach of contract suits to trade mark infringement and labour disputes." The Tribunals enforce nizam (decrees) issued by the King. Specific modern aspects of commercial law, for example, commercial paper and securities, intellectual property, and corporate law are governed by modern regulations, and specialist government tribunals deal with related disputes. The government recently revised its intellectual property laws to meet World Trade Organization standards, as part of its admission to the WTO in 2004. Because of a lack of resources, when the new patent law went into effect in 2004, the Saudi Patent office had only registered 90 patents since 1989, with a backlog of 9,000 applications. It is believed the backlog has now been reduced.

The Saudi government is also putting greater resources into combating unauthorized distribution of software, printed material, recordings and videos. However, illegally copied material is still widely available. Enforcement efforts have been supported by a fatwa, or religious ruling, that copyright infringement of software is forbidden under Islam. Saudi Arabia had been on the Special 301 Watchlist, the U.S.'s running log of countries considered to inadequately regulate or enforce intellectual property rights, but was removed in 2010.

Saudi law recognizes only corporate or partnership entities established under Sharia or the Saudi Company Law of 1982. A contract with any other type of company will be void and the persons who made the contract in the company's name will be personally liable for it. Under Sharia, corporations can take a number of forms, but the most common in Saudi Arabia is Sharikat Modarabah where some partners contribute assets and others contribute expertise. In addition, the Company Law (which is based on Egyptian company law) identifies eight permissible forms of corporate entity including joint ventures, and limited liability partnerships. However, this law was superseded in 2016, and again in 2023 with the aim of stimulating small business growth by loosening some types of business restrictions. Among the key changes reflected in the most recent 2023 update, is that companies in the Kingdom with less than 49 employees and SR10 million ($2.66 million) in annual revenue are exempt from tax audits.

=== Labor law ===
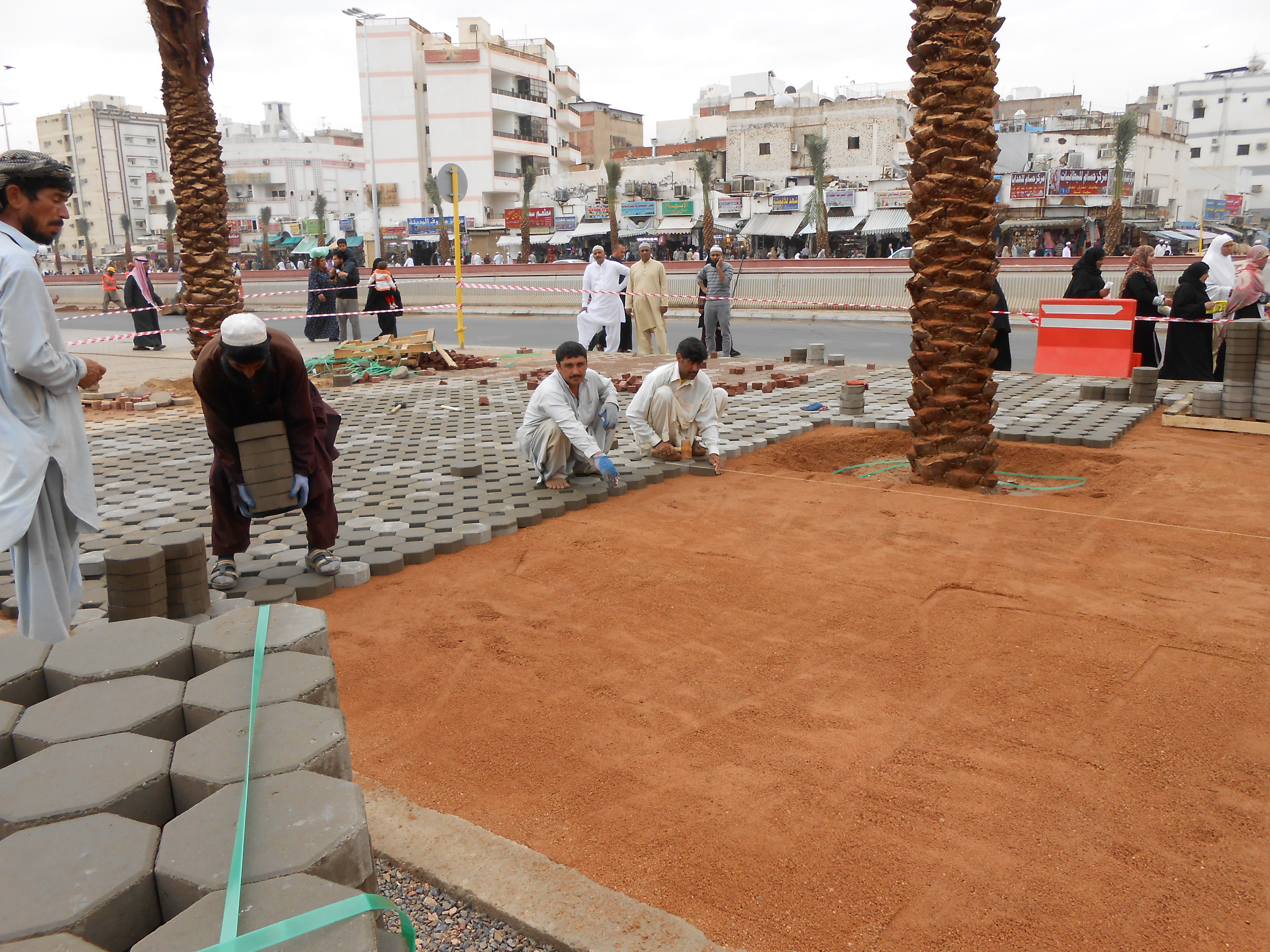
Pakistani labor at Al Masjid Nabawi (the Prophet's Mosque) in Medina

Employers have a number of obligations, including at least 21 days paid holiday after a year's employment and will be 30 days after five years of continuous service. Terminated employees must receive an "end-of-service" payment of a half a months' salary for each year employed going up to one month if employed for more than five years.

Foreign workers are only permitted to have a fixed-term employment contract (as opposed to an indefinite term contract); if no specific term is stipulated in the contract, then it ends in conjunction with the expiration of the employee's work permit. Agricultural workers and domestic workers including drivers, cleaning staff, and landscapers are not covered by labor protections, and frequently subjected to mistreatment.

=== Land law ===
Most land in Saudi Arabia is owned by the government and only cultivated land and urban property are subject to individual ownership. All land titles must be registered, but there is no accurate information as to the extent of registration. Real estate could only be owned by Saudi citizens until 2000, when the property laws were amended to allow foreigners to own property in Saudi Arabia. Property investments by non-Saudis of more than 30 million Saudi riyals require approval of the Council of Ministers and foreigners remain prohibited from owning property in Medina and Mecca.

Saudi Arabia has three categories of land: developed land (amir), undeveloped land (mawat), and "protective zones" (harim). Developed land comprises the built environment of towns and villages and agriculturally developed land, and can be bought, sold and inherited by individuals. The undeveloped land comprises rough grazing, pasture and wilderness. Rough grazing and pasture is owned in common and everyone has equal rights to its use. The wilderness is owned by the state and may be open to everyone unless specific restrictions are imposed. Harim land is a protective buffer between the owned land and the undeveloped land, and is defined, in the case of a town, as the area that can be reached and returned from in a day for the purposes of collecting fuel and pasturing livestock.

Saudi law utilizes the Waqf, which is a form of land ownership whereby a Muslim can transfer property to a foundation for long-term religious or charitable purposes. The property cannot then be alienated or transferred.

=== Energy law ===
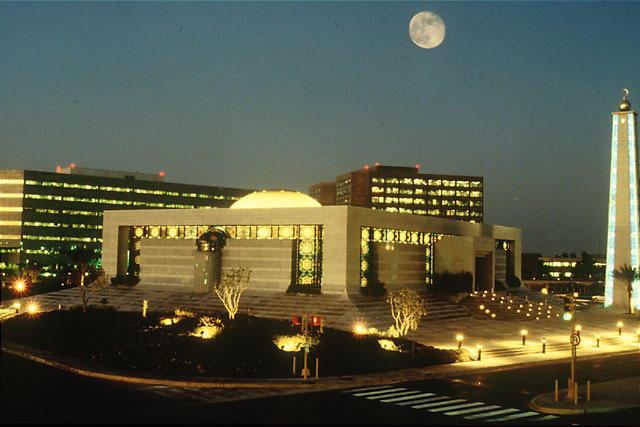
Saudi Aramco's headquarters complex in Dhahran, Eastern Province

Saudi Arabia's vast oil reserves are owned by the Saudi government, in effect the Saudi royal family. Article 14 of the Basic Law states:

All natural resources that God has deposited underground, above ground, in territorial waters or within the land and sea domains under the authority of the State, together with revenues of these resources, shall be the property of the State, as provided by the Law. The Law shall specify means for exploitation, protection and development of these resources in the best interest of the State, and its security and economy.

The Ministry of Energy, Industry and Mineral Resources is responsible for general strategy in the oil and gas sectors and for monitoring the state-owned oil company, Saudi Aramco. The oil, gas and refining industries in Saudi Arabia are controlled by law by Saudi Aramco, which has a near monopoly in these areas. It is the world's biggest oil producer, the Middle East's biggest company and is generally considered to be the most important energy company in the world. However, in 2003, the law was changed to allow foreign companies to look for Saudi Arabia's vast reserves of natural gas, believed to represent 4% of the world's reserves. This was the first time since the 1970s that foreign companies have been permitted to search for oil or gas.

Currently, the electricity industry is in the hands of the 75% state-owned Saudi Electric Company, but plans have been announced to privatize the industry.

== Human rights and rule of law issues ==
Human rights issues and failings in the rule of law in Saudi Arabia have attracted strong criticism. These include criminal law punishments that are considered as cruel, as well as the position of women, religious discrimination, the lack of religious freedom and the activities of the Saudi Mutaween.

Between 1996 and 2000, Saudi Arabia acceded to four UN human rights conventions and, in 2004, the government approved the establishment of the National Society for Human Rights (NSHR), staffed by government employees, to monitor their implementation. The activities of the NSHR have been limited and doubts remain over its neutrality and independence. Saudi Arabia was one of only eight countries that did not accept the UN's Universal Declaration of Human Rights when it was launched in 1948. Now, only Saudi Arabia remains openly opposed to the declaration. In response to the continuing criticism of its human rights record, the Saudi government points to the special Islamic character of the country, and asserts that this justifies a different social and political order.

=== Rule of law ===
Because Sharia, as applied by Saudi courts, is uncodified and because judges are not bound by judicial precedent, the scope and content of the law is uncertain. A study published by the Albert Shanker Institute and Freedom House has criticized a number of aspects of the administration of justice in Saudi Arabia and concluded that the country's "practices diverge from the concept of the rule of law." The study goes on to assert that qadis (judges) reach decisions without following due process and "only the bravest of lawyers ... challenge decisions of the qadis; usually appeals to the king are based on mercy, not on justice or innocence." It also claimed that members of the Saudi royal family are not forced to appear before Saudi courts.

As in many countries, those with influence may receive favorable treatment before the law. According to a former managing editor at Arab News, the ruling House of Saud is so unwilling "to let one of their own face the consequences of his criminal activity" that on the rare occasions that they are arrested for a crime, the perpetrating prince is pardoned (Prince Fahd bin Naif, who was 19, gunned down Mundir al-Qadi in 2002) or released, and further media mention of the incident forbidden by the Ministry of Culture and Information (four princes that participated in the disruption of a 2002 Eid al-Fitr gathering on the corniche of Jeddah).

On the other hand, blue collar foreign workers have sometimes been unable to collect salaries due even when the Saudi Labor Office has ruled in their favor, since employers can stall payment until the worker' work permits have expired.

=== Women's rights ===
The U.S. State department considers that “discrimination against women is a significant problem” in Saudi Arabia and that women have few political or social rights. After her 2008 visit, the UN special rapporteur on violence against women noted the lack of women's autonomy and the absence of a law criminalizing violence against women. The World Economic Forum 2012 Global Gender Gap Report ranked Saudi Arabia 131st out of 135 countries for gender parity, ahead of Syria, Chad, Pakistan and Yemen.

Every adult woman has to have a close male relative as her "guardian". As a result, Human Rights Watch has described the position of Saudi women as no different from being a minor, with little authority over their own lives. The guardian is entitled to make a number of critical decisions on a woman's behalf. These include giving approval for the woman to hold some types of business licenses, to study at a university or college and to work if the type of business is not "deemed appropriate for a woman." Even where a guardian's approval is not legally required, some officials will still ask for it. However, the Saudi guardianship system was abolished in August 2019, allowing women to travel and own businesses without the need of a guardian's approval. Women also face discrimination in the courts, where the testimony of one man equals that of two women, and in family and inheritance law (see above).

Women formerly required permission to obtain a passport and travel. This restriction was removed on July 26, 2019. Crown Prince Mohammed also extended to women the right to receive equal treatment in the workplace and to obtain family documents from the government in August 2019.

The religious police mutawa impose restrictions on women when in public. These restrictions include requiring women to sit in separate specially designated family sections in restaurants, to wear an abaya (a loose-fitting, full-length black cloak covering the entire body) and to conceal their hair. Women also risk arrest for riding in a vehicle driven by a male who is not an employee or a close male relative. Although there was no written ban on women driving cars, it was previously effectively illegal for women to drive cars in Saudi Arabia, as a Saudi driving license is required by law and these were not issued to women. Driving licenses started being issued to women in June 2018, and the effective ban was lifted on the 24th of June 2018.

In 2013, Saudi Arabia registered its first female trainee lawyer, Arwa al-Hujaili.

=== Political freedom and freedom of speech ===
No political parties or national elections are permitted in Saudi Arabia and according to The Economist's 2010 Democracy Index, the Saudi government is the seventh most authoritarian regime from among the 167 countries rated. There is no legal protection of freedom of speech and people are prohibited from publicly criticizing the government, religion, or the royal family. The Saudi press is strictly censored and articles on Saudi dissidents are banned. Saudi censorship is considered among the most restrictive in the world and the country blocks broad swathes of the Internet. After protests occurred in early 2011, the government banned all public demonstrations and marches.

Jamal Khashoggi, an outspoken critic of Saudi Arabia, was murdered by Saudi Officials in 2018. A number of other critics and protesters were also arrested.

=== Criminal trials and punishment ===
Western-based organisations such as Amnesty International and Human Rights Watch have condemned both the Saudi criminal justice system and its severe punishments. However, most Saudis reportedly support the system and say that it maintains a low crime rate.

Human Rights Watch, in their 2008 report on Saudi Arabian criminal justice system, noted that the criminal procedure code introduced in 2002 lacked some basic protections but, as mentioned above, had been ignored by judges in any case. Those arrested are often not informed of the crime of which they are accused or given access to a lawyer and are subject to abusive treatment and torture if they do not confess. At trial, there is a presumption of guilt and the accused is often unable to examine witnesses and evidence or present a legal defense. Most trials are held in secret, that is, without the public or press. The physical punishments imposed by Saudi courts, such as beheading, stoning, amputation and lashing, and the number of executions have also been strongly criticized.

Saudi Arabia has been condemned by various international organizations for its discriminatory legal system towards the guilty. In June 2017, Saudi officials were accused of illegally transferring a Saudi student studying in the US, who was accused of killing a teenager in Oregon. The accused faced first-degree manslaughter — with a minimum sentence of 10 years — as well as hit-and-run, reckless endangerment and reckless driving charges in the US. As per a report by BBC, Saudi authorities helped him obtain an illegal passport and fled him out of the States in a private plane. In June 2018, Saudi officials informed the US that the student had been in the kingdom for a year.

Saudi Arabia has made bail for its nationals on several previous occasions as well, including for a man accused of rape in Utah in 2015, who also fled, and in 2013 for a Missouri resident, who was accused but later acquitted of murdering a person.

Disregarding the 2020 ruling of abolishing death penalty for juveniles, Saudi Arabia executed Mustafa Hashem al-Darwish in June 2021, over the allegations of taking part in anti-government demonstrations at the age of 17. He was being held in detention since May 2015 and was placed in solitary confinement for years. During the trial, al-Darwish revealed that he faced brutal torture and beatings and was forced to sign confessions.

=== Religious freedom ===
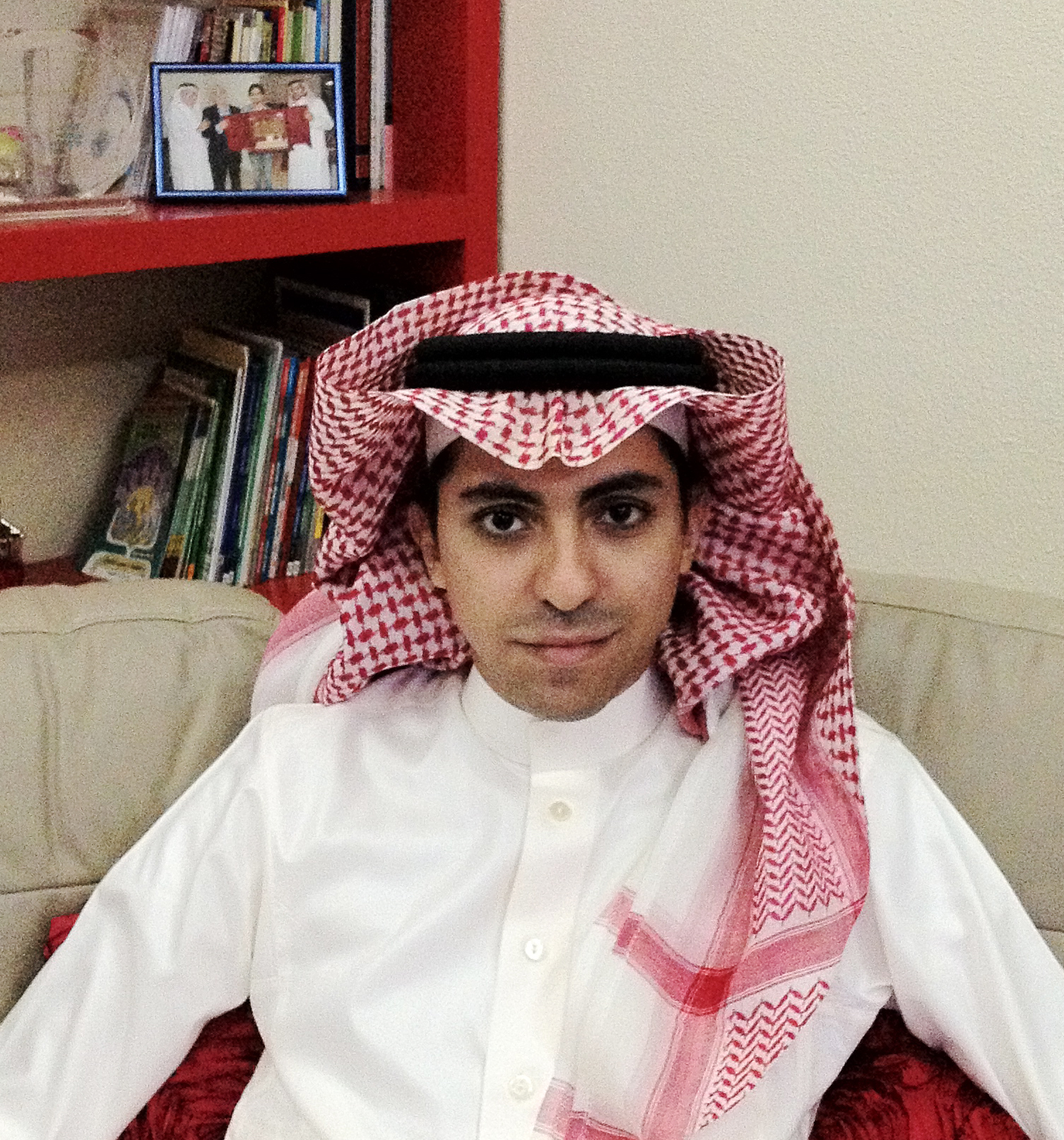
Saudi Arabian activist Raif Badawi was arrested for blasphemy.

In 2010, the U.S. State Department stated that in Saudi Arabia "freedom of religion is neither recognized nor protected under the law and is severely restricted in practice" and that "government policies continued to place severe restrictions on religious freedom". No faith other than Islam is permitted to be practised, although there are nearly a million Christians, nearly all foreign workers, in Saudi Arabia. There are no churches or other non-Muslim houses of worship permitted in the country. Even private prayer services are forbidden in practice and the Saudi religious police reportedly regularly search the homes of Christians. Foreign workers must observe Ramadan and are not allowed to celebrate Christmas or Easter. Conversion by Muslims to another religion (apostasy) carries the death penalty, although there have been no confirmed reports of executions for apostasy in recent years. Proselytizing by non-Muslims is illegal, and the last Christian priest was expelled from Saudi Arabia in 1985. Compensation in court cases discriminates against non-Muslims: once fault is determined, a Muslim receives all of the amount of compensation determined, a Jew or Christian half, and all others a sixteenth.

According to Human Rights Watch, the Shia minority face systematic discrimination from the Saudi government in education, the justice system and especially religious freedom. Restrictions are imposed on the public celebration of Shia festivals such as Ashura and on the Shia taking part in communal public worship.

In March 2014, the Saudi interior ministry issued a royal decree branding all atheists as terrorists, which defines terrorism as "calling for atheist thought in any form, or calling into question the fundamentals of the Islamic religion on which this country is based".

=== LGBT rights ===
Saudi Arabia is one of the few countries in the world where homosexual acts are not only illegal but punishable by execution. There have also been raids on "gay parties" and men have been arrested for "behaving like women". The usual penalties inflicted have been limited to flogging and imprisonment.

== See also ==
- Saudi Arabian nationality law
