= 2011–2012 Saudi Arabian protests =

Arab Spring protests in Saudi Arabia

- Part of Qatif conflict and the Arab Spring
- Date: 11 March 2011 – 24 December 2012 (1 year, 11 months and 3 days)
- Location: Saudi Arabia; 24.65°N 46.767°E
- Caused by: Prisoners held without trial; Inequality for women; Corruption; High unemployment; Discrimination against Shias; Saudi troops intervention in Bahrain; Inspiration from concurrent regional protests; Arrest of Nimr al-Nimr
- Goals: Political and economic changes; Women's suffrage; Women's right to drive; Release of political prisoners; Deportation of Peninsula Shield Force from Bahrain; Equality for Shias; Constitution and independent legislative assembly in Eastern Province; Release of Nimr al-Nimr
- Methods: Demonstrations; Self-immolation; Internet activism
- Result: Saudi government victory
- Concessions: US$130,000,000,000 to benefit citizens; Municipal elections held on 29 September 2011; Women to participate in 2015 municipal elections and be nominated to Consultative Assembly; Partial shift from imprisonment without trial to imprisonment with trial; King Khalid University president fired on 1 July 2012

Parties
Opposition; Coalition for Freedom and Justice; Women to drive movement; Saudi Civil and Political Rights Association; Human Rights First Society; Asharq Center for Human Rights; Committee for the Defense of Human Rights in the Arabian Peninsula; Society for Development and Change; Association for the Protection and Defense of Women's Rights in Saudi Arabia; Umma Islamic Party; Supported by: United States; Iran	Government of Saudi Arabia; Ministry of Interior; General Directorate of Public Security; General Directorate of Investigations

Lead figures
Human Rights Defenders: Manal al-Sharif (Co-founder of Women to drive movement); Mohammad Fahad al-Qahtani (Leader and co-founder of the Saudi Civil and Political Rights Association); Wajeha al-Huwaider (Co-founder of Association for the Protection and Defense of Women's Rights in Saudi Arabia); Independent Opposition leaders: Faisal Ahmed Abdul-Ahad (Facebook Activist); Nimr al-Nimr (executed) (Shia Sheikh); Hatoon al-Fassi (Female suffrage activist); Morsi al-Rebh † (Shia Activist)	King Abdullah; King of Saudi Arabia; Prince Salman; Crown Prince of Saudi Arabia; Prince Nayef; Crown Prince of Saudi Arabia (until June 2012); Prince Muhammad; Interior Minister

Number
Protesters:	Thousands
Online campaign:	26,000

Casualties and losses
36 killed 100+ injured 50 arrested in Riyadh and 952 in East Province	13 killed (identified); Unknown injuries

The protests in Saudi Arabia were part of the Arab Spring that started with the 2011 Tunisian revolution. Protests started with a self-immolation in Samtah and Jeddah street protests in late January 2011. Protests against anti-Shia discrimination followed in February and early March in Qatif, Hofuf, al-Awamiyah, and Riyadh. A Facebook organiser of a planned 11 March "Day of Rage", Faisal Ahmed Abdul-Ahad, was allegedly killed by Saudi security forces on 2 March, with several hundred people protesting in Qatif, Hofuf and al-Amawiyah on the day itself. Khaled al-Johani demonstrated alone in Riyadh, was interviewed by BBC Arabic Television, was detained in ʽUlaysha Prison, and became known online as "the only brave man in Saudi Arabia". Many protests over human rights took place in April 2011 in front of government ministry buildings in Riyadh, Ta'if and Tabuk and in January 2012 in Riyadh. In 2011, Nimr al-Nimr encouraged his supporters in nonviolent resistance.

Anti-government protests demanding release of prisoners held without charge or trial continued in April and May 2011 in Qatif, al-Awamiyah and Hofuf in the Eastern Province, and extended to calls for the Peninsula Shield Force to be withdrawn from Bahrain and for the Eastern Province to have a constitution and a legislature. Four protesters were shot dead by Saudi authorities in late November in Qatif region protests and funerals, two on 2012 January 13 and two on 9 and 10 February 2012. In the early 2012 demonstrations, protesters chanted slogans against the House of Saud and Minister of Interior, Nayef, calling Nayef a "terrorist", "criminal" and "butcher" and throwing an effigy of Nayef at tanks. Police described two of the fatal shootings as responses to unidentified gunmen who had shot first. Eastern Province protests intensified after Sheikh Nimr al-Nimr was wounded in the leg and arrested by police on 8 July. Four men were killed in a protest immediately following the arrest, with several funerals and protests following, including calls for the downfall of the House of Saud. While detained, al-Nimr was tortured and started a hunger strike, he was later executed in the 2016 mass execution. Protest organisers insisted on the use of nonviolent resistance and called for all Shia and Sunni detainees to be freed. A protester and a soldier were fatally shot in Qatif during a 3–4 August protest, leading to more protests.

Protests and sit-ins calling for political prisoners to be released spread beyond the Eastern Province to protests at the Ministry of Interior in Riyadh on 20 March and in Riyadh and Buraidah in December 2011, and in July and August 2012 near al-Ha'ir Prison.

Women organised a Facebook women's suffrage campaign called "Baladi", stating that Saudi Arabian law gives women electoral rights. In April 2011, women in Jeddah, Riyadh and Dammam tried to register as electors for the 29 September municipal elections despite officials stating that women could not participate. In May and June, Manal al-Sharif and other women organised a women's right-to-drive campaign, with the main action to take place on 17 June. In late September, Shaima Jastania was sentenced to 10 lashes for driving in Jeddah, shortly after King Abdullah announced women's participation in the 2015 municipal elections and eligibility as Consultative Assembly members; King Abdullah overturned the sentence. Al-Sharif and Samar Badawi filed lawsuits against Saudi authorities in the Grievances Board, a non-Sharia court, because of the rejection of their driving licence applications. Women university students protested in King Khalid University (KKU) in Abha in March 2012 and were attacked by security forces, leading to one death. Other university protests followed in Taibah University in Medina and Tabuk University in March and April. KKU students called for the university president to be dismissed. He was replaced on 1 July 2012.

== Protests timeline ==
=== January–April 2011 ===
Protests started with a 65-year-old man's self-immolation in Samtah, Jizan on 21 January and protests of a few hundred people in late January in Jeddah, triggered by flooding, and several times throughout February and early March in the cities of Qatif, al-Awamiyah, Riyadh, and Hofuf. A "Day of Rage" was planned for 11 March. One of the main organisers, Faisal Ahmed Abdul-Ahad (or Abdul-Ahadwas), was alleged to have been killed by Saudi security forces on 2 March, by which time one of the Facebook groups discussing the plans had over 26,000 members. On 11 March, several hundred people protested in Qatif, Hofuf and al-Amawiyah. Khaled al-Johani demonstrated in Riyadh despite a massive police presence, was interviewed by BBC Arabic Television, and has since then been detained in 'Ulaysha Prison. Al-Johani became known online as "the only brave man in Saudi Arabia".

The Saudi Civil and Political Rights Association (ACPRA) and the Saudi organisation Human Rights First Society called for ACPRA co-founder Mohammed Saleh Albejadi to be released following his arbitrary arrest in Buraidah on 21 March by Mabahith, the internal security agency. In April, several small protests over labour rights took place in front of government ministry buildings in Riyadh, Ta'if and Tabuk. Protests, made up mainly of Shia protesters, continued in late March and April in Qatif and smaller cities in the Eastern Province such as al-Awamiyah, and Hofuf. The protesters called for the release of prisoners, for the Peninsula Shield Force to be withdrawn from Bahrain, for equal representation in key offices and for reforms in political positions, as they feel marginalised.

In response to the 22–23 March announcement of men-only municipal elections in late September 2011 to elect half the members of local councils, women organised a Facebook women's suffrage campaign called "Baladi", stating that Saudi Arabian law gives women electoral rights. In April, women in Jeddah, Riyadh and Dammam tried to register as electors for the 22 September municipal elections despite officials stating that women could not participate.

=== May–December 2011 ===
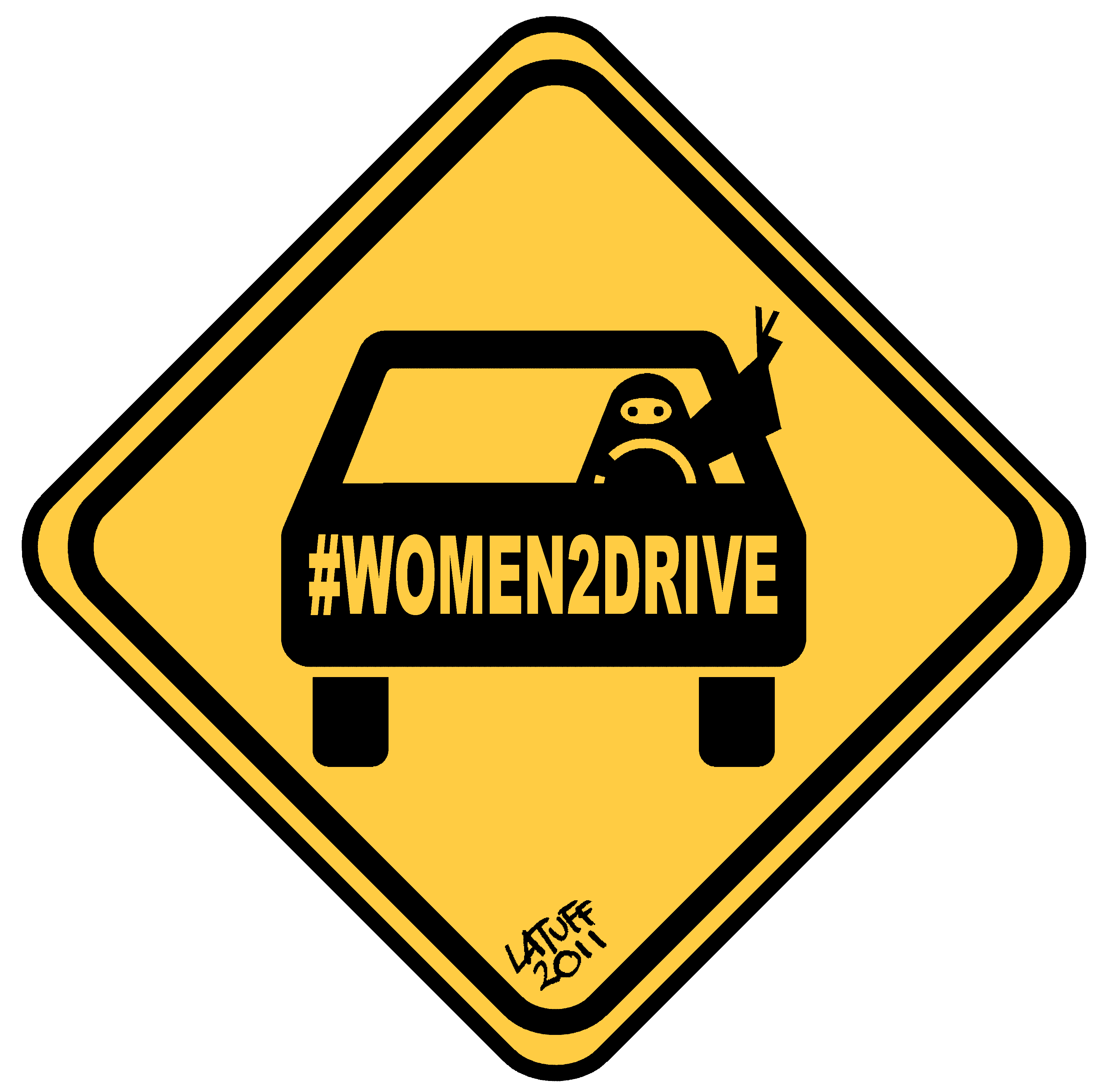
Poster for the Saudi Arabia's women to drive movement, artwork by Carlos Latuff.

In May and June, motivated by the Arab Spring, Manal al-Sharif and other women organised a women's right-to-drive campaign, with the main action to take place on 17 June. Al-Sharif drove a car in May and was detained on 22 May and from 23‒30 May. Other women also drove cars, including actress Wajnat Rahbini, who was arrested after driving in Jeddah on 4 June and released a day later. From 17 June to late June, about seventy cases of women driving were documented. In late September, Shaima Jastania was sentenced to 10 lashes for driving in Jeddah, shortly after King Abdullah announced women's participation in the 2015 municipal elections and eligibility as Consultative Assembly members. King Abdullah cancelled the sentence.

From 17 June to late June, more than seventy cases of women driving were documented. In October protests, police shot live ammunition at protesters. The protesters called for Eastern Province to have its own constitution and legislative assembly, and for their association Society for Development and Change to be legally registered. In late November, Nasser al-Mheishi, Ali al-Felfel, Munib al-Sayyed al-'Adnan and Ali Abdullah al-Qarairis were shot dead by security forces in the Qatif region in successive protests and funerals.

Hundreds of people protested in Riyadh and Buraidah in December, calling for the release or trial of prisoners.

=== January–June 2012 ===
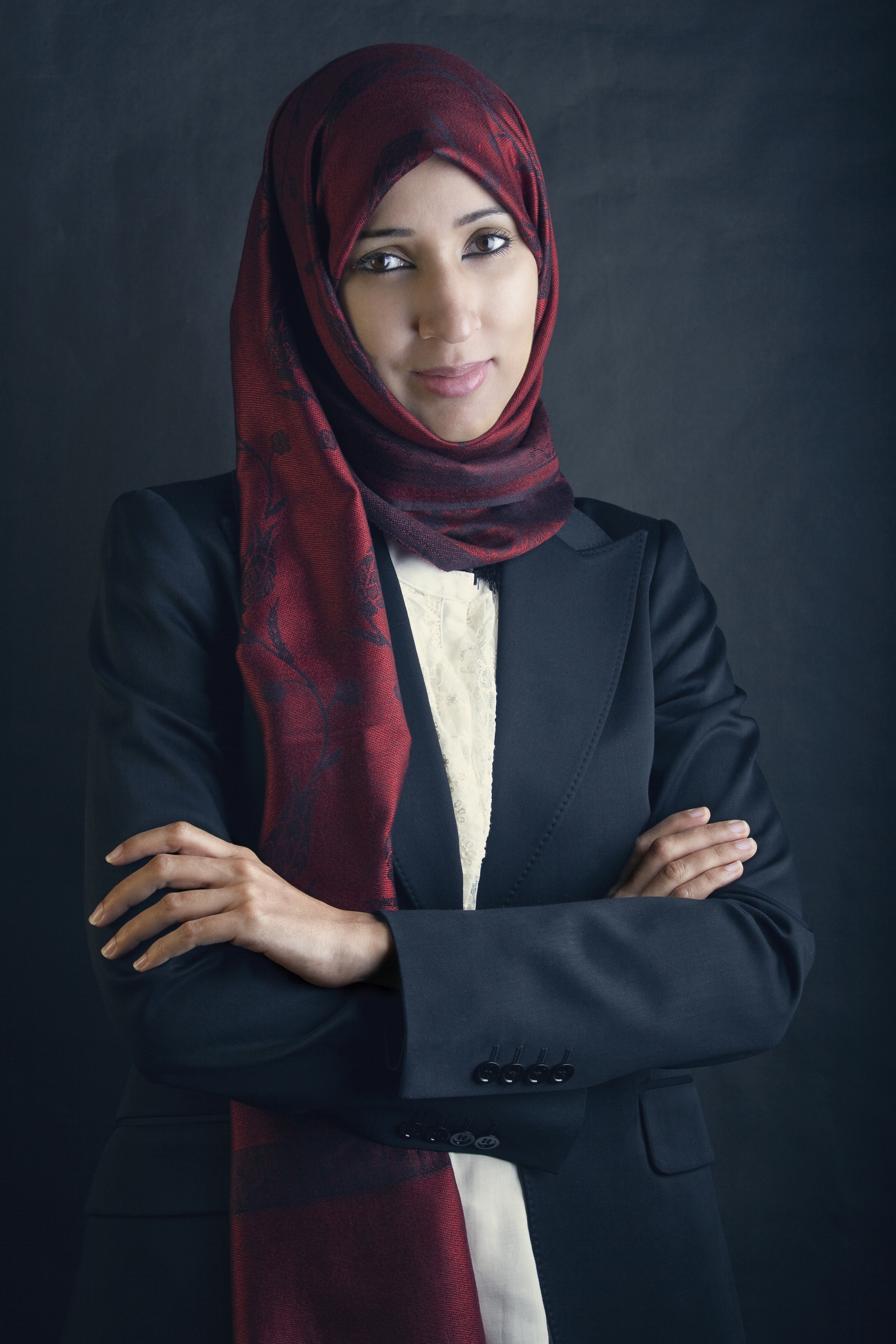
Women's rights activist Manal al-Sharif, one of the organisers of the women's right-to-drive campaign

A protest for labour rights took place in Riyadh on 14 January and a sit-in calling for the Syrian Ambassador to be expelled occurred on 5 February in Jeddah.

Protests in the Qatif region continued from January to May, with security forces arresting medical personnel. Security forces shot dead Issam Mohamed Abu Abdallah in al-Awamiyah on 12 or 13 January, and Munir al-Midani and Zuhair al-Said on 9 and 10 February. In the 70,000 strong funeral for Abdallah on 16 January in al-Awamiyah and the daily Qatif region protests that followed, protesters chanted slogans against the House of Saud and Minister of Interior, Nayef, Crown Prince of Saudi Arabia. In mid-February, two medical personnel were arrested for having clandestinely treated injured protesters. In a 10 February protest and a 13 February funeral, an effigy of Nayef was thrown at tanks and participants described Nayef as a "terrorist", "criminal" and "butcher". Police described two of the fatal shootings as responses to unidentified gunmen who had shot first. Dawoud al-Marhoon and Abdullah Hasan al-Zaher were arrested on 22 May and 3 March 2012, when they were aged 17 and 16 respectively, for participated in the 2011–12 Saudi Arabian protests. Originally, in March 2012, Al Marhoon was questioned by Saudi police and asked to be an informant and report details about his fellow protesters. After he refused, Saudi security forces arrested him from the Dammam Central Hospital, where he was undergoing treatment for an eye injury sustained in a traffic accident. Saudi forces surrounded the hospital and arrested him as he prepared for surgery. He was arrested on 22 May 2012, and have been tortured and forced to "confess". Then sentenced to death by the Specialized Criminal Court in September 2015, and as of 23 September 2015, awaited ratification of his sentence by King Salman of Saudi Arabia, to be carried out by beheading and crucifixion (in that order).

Manal al-Sharif and Samar Badawi, active in the women to drive movement, announced that they had filed lawsuits against Saudi authorities in the Grievances Board, a non-Sharia court, because of the rejection of their driving licence applications. As of the end of June 2012, 100 Saudi women had started driving regularly since the June 2011 campaign launch. Women university students protested in King Khalid University in Abha in March and were attacked by security forces, leading to one death. Other university protests followed in Taibah University in Medina and Tabuk University in March and April.

=== July–August 2012 ===
In July 2012, Amnesty International protested in the United Nations Human Rights Council against legal persecution of Saudi Civil and Political Rights Association (ACPRA) leaders. Ten female activists were detained in a Buraidah 14 July protest calling for political prisoners to be freed. Similar protests calling for prisoners to be freed and protesting against the Saudi government occurred in Buraidah on 23 July and in front of the Ministry of Interior near al-Ha'ir Prison and in Dammam in August.

In July and August 2012, protests in the Qatif region intensified after Sheikh Nimr al-Nimr was wounded in the leg and arrested by police on 8 July. Three men were killed in a protest on the evening of the arrest. Funerals and protests took place on 10 July, including chants calling for the downfall of the House of Saud. While detained, al-Nimr was tortured, had bruises on his face and broken teeth, and started a hunger strike. Protest organisers in al-Awamiyah stated their support for al-Nimr and insisted on the use of nonviolent resistance. Protester Mohamed al-Shakhouri was shot in the back and neck and arrested in a 26–27 July protest calling for al-Nimr's release. Further protests called for all Shia and Sunni detainees to be freed. A protester and a soldier were fatally shot in Qatif during a 3–4 August evening human rights protest, leading to several more protests.

== Aftermath ==
=== 2014 Qatif protests ===
In early 2014, conflict between protesters and the security forces continued, with Qatif being "a militarised zone, surrounded by checkpoints and armoured vehicles". A Saudi journalist who had been documenting the protests for two years for the BBC left Saudi Arabia as she judged the situation "too risky for [her] to continue investigating". Nimr al-Nimr was sentenced to death by the Specialized Criminal Court on 15 October 2014 for "seeking 'foreign meddling' in [Saudi Arabia], 'disobeying' its rulers and taking up arms against the security forces". His brother, Mohammad al-Nimr, was arrested on the same day for tweeting information about the death sentence. Al-Nimr was executed on or shortly before 2 January 2016, along with 46 others in a mass execution. His execution was condemned by Iran and Shiites throughout the Middle East, as well as by Western figures and Sunnis opposed to sectarianism. The Saudi government said the body would not be handed over to the family. In March 2017, after a long campaign of harassment, the Saudi security forces killed two members of Nimr family during a raid on a farm in eastern Saudi Arabia. Miqdad and Mohammad Al-Nimr were killed at a farm in Awamiyah, the Nimr family hometown. al-Nimr was very critical of the Saudi Arabian government, and called for free elections in Saudi Arabia.

Protests in the Qatif region continued during 2017–19, with deaths of protestors and security forces.

== Casualties ==
=== Deaths ===
Notable deaths (protesters)
Name	Age	From	Date of death	Cause of death
Faisal Ahmed Abdul-Ahad (or Abdul-Ahadwas) (Administrator of Facebook group calling for 11 March "Day of Rage", according to DPA)	27	Riyadh	Before 2 March 2011	Shot by the Saudi security forces, who removed his body to "hide evidence of the crime".
Nasser al-Mheishi (or Nasir al-Muhaishi)	19	Al-Shweika	20 November 2011	Shot by the police during a protest.
Ali al-Felfel	24	Al-Shweika	21 November 2011	Shot in the chest by police during a funeral for Nasser al-Mheishi.
Munib al-Sayyed al-Adnan	20	Al-Shweika	23 November 2011	Shot in the head by police during protest over al-Mheishi and al-Felfel killings.
Ali Abdullah al-Qarayrees	26	Al-Awamiyah	23 November 2011	Shot by police during protest over al-Mheishi and al-Felfel killings.
Issam Mohamed Abu Abdallah	22	Al-Awamiyah	12 January 2012	Shot by security forces during protest.
Montazar Sa'eed al-Abdel		Al-Awamiyah	26 January 2012	Shot by security forces during protest.
Muneer al-Midani	21	Al-Shweika	9 February 2012	Shot in the heart by security forces during protest.
Zuhair al-Said (or Zaheer Abdullah Saeed)	21	Al-Awamiyah	10 February 2012	Shot in the stomach by security forces during protest, died in hospital.
Hajer al-Yazidi		Abha	7 March 2012	Epileptic student injured in head during protest, died of head wound.
Akbar Hassan al-Shakhouri	31	Al-Awamiyah	8 July 2012	Shot by security forces during protest over the arrest of Nimr al-Nimr.
Mohamed Redha al-Felfel	18	Al-Awamiyah	8 July 2012	Shot by security forces during protest over the arrest of Nimr al-Nimr.
Abdallah Jaafar al-Ojami	18	Al-Awamiyah	13 July 2012	Shot by security forces near a police station during protest.
Hussain Yusuf al-Qallaf	18	Tarout Island	4 August 2012	Shot in the chest by security forces during protest on 3 August, died of injuries on 4 August.
Khaled Abdulkarim al-Labad	26	Al-Awamiyah	26 September 2012	Shot in the head by security forces while authorities were trying to arrest him, he was one of 23 opposition activist accused of organising protests in Qatif.
Mohammed Habib al-Mnasif	16	Al-Awamiyah	26 September 2012	Shot by security forces while authorities were trying to arrest Khaled Abdulkarim al-Labad.
Hassan Mohammad Zaheri	16	Al-Awamiyah	28 September 2012	Shot by security forces while authorities were trying to arrest Khaled Abdulkarim al-Labad on 26 September, died of injuries on 28 September.
Ahmad al-Matar	18	Tarout Island	28 December 2012	Shot by security forces during protest over the detention of prisoners.
Ali Hassan al-Mahroos	19	Qatif	21 June 2013	Shot in his car by a stray bullet by police when they fired at another person on a motorbike.

Notable deaths (security forces)
Name	Age	From	Date of death	Cause of death
Hussein Bawah Ali Zabani	20 or 21	Al-Malha	4 August 2012	Shot by "rioters on a motorbike" in Qatif according to Ministry of Interior spokesperson Mansour al-Turki.

==== Others ====
On 21 January 2011, an unidentified 65-year-old man died after setting himself on fire in the town of Samtah, Jizan. This was apparently the kingdom's first known case of self-immolation.

On 10 September 2012, a Bangladeshi man was shot dead in the Al-Awamiyah district of eastern Saudi Arabia. Saudi police said that the Bangladeshi man was driving when his car was hit by bullets fired at two security patrol cars. However, an activist in Al-Awamiyah gave a different account of the incident, saying the man had been killed by gunfire when security forces stormed a house while trying to arrest one of the 23 wanted activist for organising protest in Qatif.

== Response ==
=== Domestic ===
On 10 February 2011, a Reuters report claimed that 10 intellectuals, human rights activists and lawyers came together to create the Umma Islamic Party – considered to be the first political party in Saudi Arabia since the 1990s – to demand the end of absolute monarchy in the country. On 18 February however, all ten members of the party were arrested and ordered to withdraw demands for political reform in exchange for their release.

On 23 February, Saudi Arabia's King Abdullah, after returning to the country following three months spent abroad for health treatment, announced a series of benefits for citizens amounting to $10.7 billion. These include funding to offset high inflation and to aid young unemployed people and Saudi citizens studying abroad, as well as writing off some loans. State employees' incomes were increased by 15 per cent and new housing loans subsidies were introduced. No political reforms were announced as part of the package, though the 86-year-old monarch did pardon some prisoners indicted in financial crimes.

On 6 March, the Saudi Arabian Council of Senior Scholars, headed by Grand Mufti Abd al-'Aziz al-Ashaikh, issued a fatwā (religious opinion) opposing petitions and demonstrations, declaring, "Therefore the council hereby reaffirms that only the reform and [counsel] that has its legitimacy is that which may bring welfare and avert the evil, whereas it is illegal to issue statements and take signatures for the purposes of intimidation and inciting the strife. ... reform should not be by demonstrations and other means and methods that give rise to unrest and divide the community. ... The Council affirms prohibition of the demonstrations in this country and [that] the legal method which realizes the welfare without causing destruction rests on the mutual advice." The fatwa included a "severe threat against internal dissent", stating, "[The Prophet] again said: 'He who wanted separate affairs of this nation who are unified, you should kill him with sword whoever he is' (narrated by Muslim)." In late March, Abd al-'Aziz al-Ashaikh called for a million copies of the fatwa to be printed and distributed.

On 22–23 March 2011, officials of the Ministry of Municipal and Rural affairs announced that men-only municipal elections to elect half the members of local councils would be held in September 2011. Associated Press described the election announcement as having "coincided with rumblings of dissent in Saudi Arabia stemming from the wave of political unrest in the Arab world".

==== Arrests and other repression ====
About 30 to 50 people were arrested following 29 January Jeddah demonstration. On 18 February, the ten founding members of the Umma Islamic Party were arrested and ordered to withdraw demands for political reform in exchange for their release.

According to a Deutsche Presse-Agentur report on 2 March, Saudi activists have alleged that one of the main administrators of one of the Facebook groups calling for a "Day of Rage" on 11 March, Faisal Ahmed Abdul-Ahad (or Abdul-Ahadwas), was killed by Saudi security forces, who removed his body to "hide evidence of the crime".

On 5 March, thousands of security forces were sent to the north-east, causing delays on the road to Dammam. On the same day, following about two weeks of small protests in the eastern part of Saudi Arabia, the Ministry of the Interior warned that the "ban [on] all sorts of demonstrations, marches, sit-ins" imposed by Saudi law would be enforced.

On 9 March, Foreign Minister Saud Al Faisal stated that the government would not tolerate any street protests against it, while also saying that the "best way to achieve demands is through national dialogue".

On 21 March, Saudi Civil and Political Rights Association (ACPRA) co-founder Mohammed Saleh Albejadi (also Al-Bjady) was arrested in Buraidah by Mabahith, the internal security agency. ACPRA stated that the arrest was arbitrary, in violation of the Basic Law of Saudi Arabia and the Law of Criminal Procedures. Both the ACPRA and Human Rights First Society called for his immediate, unconditional release.

On 27 March 2011, Human Rights Watch estimated that the "scale of arrests [rose] dramatically during the preceding two weeks", up to about 160 protesters and critics being held without charge.

In early January 2012, Saudi authorities published the names of a list of 23 people who were allegedly involved in the October 2011 Awamiyah/Qatif protests, calling for their arrests. Ministry of Interior spokesman Mansour al-Turki alleged that the protesters "were working according to a foreign agenda" and were "sponsored financially or supplied with weapons and were working as part of an organization". Shah Ali al-Shokan (or Shaukan) from Tarout Island, one of the 23, was arrested by Mabahith on 2 January 2012. Hussain Ali Abdullah al-Baraki, Mosa Ja'far Mohammad al-Mabyouq, and two others among the 23 were also arrested on 2 January. The Ministry of Interior claimed that al-Shokan, al-Baraki and al-Mabyouq had turned themselves in voluntarily. On 10 January, Aqeel al-Yaseen was wounded in al-Awamiyah by security forces, arrested and transferred to a Mabahith facility in Dammam, and forbidden family visits.

==== Censorship ====
In mid-March 2011, Reuters chief correspondent in Saudi Arabia, Ulf Laessing, who had reported from Riyadh since 2009, had his journalistic accreditation withdrawn because of his reporting on the early 2011 Saudi Arabian protests, effectively forcing him to leave Saudi Arabia.

==== Execution of Nimr al-Nimr ====
One of the subsequent responses of the Saudi government was the arrest, conviction and subsequent execution of Nimr al-Nimr on 2 January 2016.

=== International ===
==== Governments ====
- Russia – On 12 July 2012, K.K. Dolgov, human rights representative of the Russian Ministry of Foreign Affairs, expressed "great concern" about the July events in the Eastern Province. He stated, "We expect that the authorities of the Kingdom will undertake all necessary measures to settle the situation in its eastern regions, to avoid conflict, including confrontation on interconfessional basis, and to ensure the observance of conventional human rights, including the right for freedom of expression of opinion, peaceful demonstrations and freedom of associations, as it is prescribed by the law."
- United States – On 8 March 2012, the United States Department of State awarded Samar Badawi the 2012 International Women of Courage Award, citing her filing of a lawsuit for women's voting rights in the September 2011 Saudi Arabian municipal elections and her encouragement of other women by the launching of an online campaign.

==== Street protests ====
- Australia – On 19 July 2012, 50 people protested in front of the Saudi Arabian Embassy in Canberra against the arrests of the Bahraini uprising, against "the crackdown happening in the eastern region of Saudi Arabia", and "to support the people seeking freedom of speech, seeking human rights, freedom for women".
- Canada – On 21 July 2012, 30 people protested in front of the United States (US) consulate in Toronto against US support of the Saudi Arabian government. A protest organiser claimed that the Saudi government was hypocritical because "Saudi Arabia says [it] support[s] Syria's push for freedom [in the Syrian uprising], but [it] repress[es] [its] own citizens". He called for the release of Nimr al-Nimr.

==== Media ====
Journalist Robert Fisk said that the protests were known as the "Hunayn Revolution," after the Battle of Hunayn fought between Muhammad and the Hawazin.

==== Other ====
On 21 February 2011, oil prices rose in response to the 2011 Libyan civil war and speculation regarding 11 March Saudi Arabian Day of Rage. The Saudi Tadawul stock market index fell to a seven-month low on stability concerns. During the week of 27 February, global stock prices fell as oil prices increased and silver reached a 30-year high price on stability concerns in the region. Regional stock market indices also fell on concern for Saudi stability.

In August 2017, ten Nobel Peace Prize laureates, including Desmond Tutu and Lech Wałęsa, urged Saudi Arabia to stop the executions of 14 young people for participating in the 2011–12 Saudi Arabian protests.

== See also ==
- Human rights in Saudi Arabia
- Freedom in the World
- List of freedom indices
