= Human Rights First Society =

Saudi Arabian human rights organization

Human Rights First Society (HRFS) جمعية حقوق الإنسان أولا
- Founded: 2002; 24 years ago
- Founder: Ibrahim al-Mugaiteeb
- Purpose: Human rights advocacy
- Location: Saudi Arabia
- Method: "All peaceful means"
- Website: hrfssaudiarabia.org (English) www.anhri.net/saudi/spdhr (Arabic)

The Human Rights First Society (HRFS, Arabic: جمعية حقوق الإنسان أولا) is a non-governmental and non-profit organisation which seeks to promote human rights in the Kingdom of Saudi Arabia. It is one of the few independent groups in Saudi Arabia monitoring human rights, along with the Saudi Civil and Political Rights Association, the Society for Development and Change and the Association for the Protection and Defense of Women's Rights in Saudi Arabia. The HRFS was initiated as an organisation dedicated to protecting and defending human rights in Saudi Arabia according to Islamic teachings. The HRFS stands for applying the rule of law, freedoms of expression and association, and abolishing all discrimination in Saudi society on the basis of gender or religious beliefs.

== Founding and status ==
In 2002, HRFS was created and led by Ibrahim al-Mugaiteeb whom applied to the Saudi government for legal recognition of the group. However, the application was denied. Although the HRFS was not granted governmental status, As of 2009, it remained unrecognised, but was allowed by the government to exist informally.

The Saudi Basic Law does not address freedom of association, and the government strictly limited this right in practice. The government prohibited the establishment of political parties or any group it considered as opposing the regime or challenging the King's authority. All associations must therefore be licensed and comply with its rules and regulations. The HRFS have had no response to their request for a governmental license, however, they have continued to pursue their purpose. As the group is formally 'unlicensed', it remains unclear which group activities are permitted and which could draw punishment from the government. Furthermore, without a license the group may not raise any operating funds which consequently limits its activities. Despite this, as of 2016, the HRFS continues to operate independently as a non-government organisation and is still recognised by governmental organisations.

== Aims ==
The aim of the HRFS is to ultimately defend and protect against human rights violations in Saudi Arabia. The HRFS believes in freedom of expression and association, as well as condemning all discrimination against gender or religious beliefs in Saudi Arabian society. The Human Rights First Society aims to monitor human rights violations and support victims of human rights violations, using "all peaceful means to advocate that the Saudi government respects and defends all human rights."

In fulfilling the role of the HRFS to protect the freedom of expression and association as well as condemning discrimination, the HRFS may release reports to Saudi officials as a recommendation. The reports essentially serve as a 'road map' as to whether certain laws in Saudi are in violation of international human rights conventions or treaties, or that these laws, when they exist, are not respected by the Saudi authorities. As well as making recommendations to officials, the HRFS may also welcome measures by government officials to create more accepted laws.

== Structure and leadership ==
As of March 2011, Ibrahim al-Mugaiteeb is the head of HRFS. al-Mugaiteeb is a leading human rights activist and the founder and president of the Human Rights First Society (Saudi Arabia). Despite being previously imprisoned for political activism and barred from travel, al-Mugaiteeb continues to condemn human rights abuses and speak out against discrimination. Although al-Mugaiteeb was denied a licence permitting his organisation to function as a government organisation, he continues to operate the HRFS in the Kingdom at his own risk and has done so since the introduction of the HRFS in 2002.

=== The Basic Law for Governing the Kingdom ===
The Custodian of the Two Holy Mosques, King Fahd Bin Abdulaziz Al-Saud issued a Royal Decree embodying the Basic Law of Governance for Saudi Arabia. After taking into consideration the interests of the public and with a view to progress the State, the 'Basic Law of Governance' came into force on 1 March 1992. The Basic Law of Governance is a constitution-like charter in accordance with the Salafi understanding of Sharia and does not override Islamic laws.

Article 26 of the Basic Law of Governance holds that "The State shall protect human rights in accordance with the Sharia". Sharia is the religious legal system governing the members of the Islamic faith. This article is relevant for the purposes of the HRFS in which it will use all peaceful means to advocate that the Saudi government respects this article in situations where human rights violations may become evident.

== Statements and reports ==
=== Elections ===
The 2005 municipal elections were the first to be held in Saudi Arabia since the 1960s. In the elections, male citizens over the age of 21 were able to vote for half of the members of their municipal councils. On 11 October 2004, Prince Nayef bin Abd al-Aziz, the Saudi interior minister, announced to a Kuwaiti newspaper that women will not be able to run as candidates or vote in the elections. In response to this admission, Saudi election officials gave logistical concerns for this reasoning such as the lack of separate voting booths for women, and the fact women did not have identification cards. Hatoon al-Fassi felt that the fact the officials gave practical reasons for this non-participation rather than religious or gender reasons was a success for women's campaigning

HRFS' head, Ibrahim al-Mugaiteeb, stated that the 2011 Saudi Arabian municipal elections would "be of very little significance" if they were held in a similar way to the 2005 municipal elections in that women would not be allowed to participate. He said that the minimum criteria for the elections should include all members being elected by the voters, women should participate, and the voting age should be decreased from 21 to 18".

=== 2011 Saudi Arabian protests ===
Many protests over human rights took place in front of government ministry buildings in Saudi Arabia throughout 2011 and into 2012. Anti-government protests demanding release of prisoners held without charge or trial continued in various cities in addition to protests demanding a constitution and legislature for the Eastern province. Throughout the duration of the protests, a number of protesters were shot dead by Saudi authorities following chants aimed against the House of Saud and Minister of Interior, Nayef, calling them "terrorists", "butchers" and "criminals".

On 24 March 2011, during the 2011 Saudi Arabian protests, HRFS said that 100 protestors remained under arrest following the 15–18 March protests in and near Qatif and that some had been tortured. Alongside the HRFS, the Saudi Civil and Political Rights Association (ACPRA) called for the ACPRA co-founder Mohammed Saleh al-Bejadi to be released following his arbitrary arrest in Buraidah on 21 March by the Internal Security Agency. The protests continued calling for the release of these prisoners, for the Peninsula Shield Force to be withdrawn from Bahrain, for equal representation in key offices and for reforms in political positions, as they feel marginalised.

=== Unholy Trespass Report ===
In working toward promoting and defending the rule of law, protecting freedoms of expression and association, and abolishing discrimination in Saudi society, the HRFS has compiled a report on the rule of law in Saudi Arabia and its impact on the freedoms of the Saudi people titled "Unholy Trespass: How the Saudi Legal Code Violates International Human Rights" (The Report).

The report holds that many of the unwritten laws in Saudi Arabia are "enormously regressive" and "ultimately lethal" to human rights. A nation state has a legal obligation to abide by and to enact legislation cogent with the treaties it has ratified. Furthermore, pursuant to the law of treaties, a State that has signed but not ratified a treaty is obliged to refrain from "acts which would defeat the object and purpose" of that treaty.

The report details the areas in which the Saudi Legal Code is a violation of Human Rights Law including: Surveillance and invasion of homes, criminalization of free speech and association, arbitrary arrest and prolonged detention, secretive and unfair trial proceedings, torture and capital punishment and denying women equal legal rights The report then discusses how those laws give the Saudi government broad powers to abuse the human rights of Saudi citizens, with particular attention given to the vulnerability of women, religious minorities, migrant workers and children Finally, the report demonstrates where the Saudi government fails to adhere to its own domestic laws in the practice of its treatment of Saudi citizens, violating human rights which it has itself professed to protect in its own law and which is protected under international law.

== See also ==
- Human rights in Saudi Arabia
- Basic Law of Saudi Arabia
