= Elections in Saudi Arabia =

Elections in Saudi Arabia are held infrequently and only at the municipal level. Candidates are not popularly elected and elections take place in an authoritarian context. Municipal elections were last held in 2015, the first time women had the right to vote and stand as candidates. There are no elections at the national level.

== History ==
The first municipal elections in Saudi Arabia took place in the mid-1920s in the Hijaz cities of Mecca, Medina, Jeddah, Yanbu and Taif, as King Abdulaziz ibn Saud established local governments to replace Ottoman and Hashemite rule. Elections for other municipalities were held between 1954 and 1962 during the reign of King Saud, an experiment that ended under the centralization of King Faisal.

In 2005, elections for half of the municipal councilors were held, with men aged over 21 voting for male candidates. In May 2009, elections scheduled for October were postponed so authorities could consider expanding those eligible to vote, including women. Women were not granted franchise until after the 2011 elections, which drew condemnation from Human Rights Watch; some female activists planned 'parallel' municipal councils following the vote.

Saudi Arabia's Consultative Assembly (Majlis ash-Shura) is wholly advisory in function, with 150 appointed members and the Speaker, currently Abdullah ibn Muhammad Al ash-Sheikh, is appointed by the King. Political parties are outlawed.

=== Women's participation ===
Arguments against female suffrage were that not enough women would be available to staff female polling stations (Gender segregation is normal in the country) and that only a small number of women held ID cards, which would be required in order for them to vote. Amnesty International called King Abdullah's 2011 announcement women could stand for election and vote from 2012 "a welcome, albeit limited, step along the long road towards gender equality in Saudi Arabia, and a testament to the long struggle of women's rights activists there".

== See also ==
- Women's rights in Saudi Arabia
- Women's suffrage
