= ʽUlaysha Prison =

Prison in Riyadh, Saudi Arabia

ʽUlaysha Prison سجن عليشة
- Interactive map of ʽUlaysha Prison سجن عليشة
- Location: Riyadh; 24°38′22″N 46°40′58″E
- Status: Operational
- Managed by: Mabahith

Notable prisoners
- Khalil Janahi, 5 Umma Islamic Party founding members, Khaled al-Johani

ʽUlaysha Prison (also ʽUlaisha, Alisha, Olisha, سجن عليشة) is a prison in Riyadh run by the Saudi Arabian secret police agency Mabahith for arbitrary detention. During the 2011 Saudi Arabian protests, "the only brave man in Saudi Arabia", Khaled al-Johani, was held in 'Ulaysha Prison and it is suspected that several founding members of the Umma Islamic Party are being held there.

== Prisoners ==
On 17 March 2004, Amnesty International stated that at least five people, mostly academics, had been held incommunicado for two days in ʽUlaysha Prison over criticising a government body, the National Commission for Human Rights, and planning to create their own human rights organisation.

=== Prisoners held arbitrarily ===
The UN Working Group on Arbitrary Detention complained to Saudi Arabian authorities in 2007 about the arbitrary arrest and detention of Faiz bin Abdelmohsen Al Qaid, who had been held in ʽUlaysha Prison since 12 October 2005 because he had given information to the Arab Commission for Human Rights and other organisations about human rights in Saudi Arabia and Saudi Arabian prisons. The following year, the Working Group complained to Saudi authorities about the arbitrary arrest and detention of Abdel Rahman Samara, a Palestinian, who was held in ʽUlaysha Prison for five and a half months before being transferred to al-Ha'ir Prison. The Working Group said that holding Samara "incommunicado, without access to a lawyer and without being brought to justice" constituted a violation of Article 9 of the Universal Declaration of Human Rights.

Bahraini citizen Khalil ʽAbdul Rahman ʽAbdul Karim al-Janahi was held in ʽUlaysha Prison for at least 4 months for an unknown reason, starting 26 April 2007, without access to lawyers and without a trial. In November 2008 he was transferred from the Saudi prison system to the United Arab Emirates, where he was detained without charge or trial until 11 June 2009, shortly after an Amnesty International appeal for his release. For the first four months in ʽUlaysha Prison, Janahi was held in solitary confinement, handcuffed, in a one square metre cell, and had no contact with his family.

Riyadh University professor Dr Bachr al-Bachr, described by the support group for uncharged prisoners Adala as "a peaceful advocate of political change who frequently publicly criticised his government and its policies", was detained on 15 March 2007 by Mabahith secret police at his home. He was held at ʽUlaysha Prison and tortured. His family was first allowed access to him after nine months, at which time he stated that he "was being held in a refrigerated underground cell where he was permanently handcuffed and blindfolded."

=== Political prisoners ===
Five founding members of the Umma Islamic Party, created in 2011, Dr. Ahmad bin Sa'd al-Ghamidi, Professor Sa'ud al-Dughaithir, Shaikh Abd al-ʽAziz al-Wuhaibi, Shaikh Muhammad bin Husain al-Qahtani, Professor Muhammad bin Nasir al-Ghamidi, Walid al-Majid and Professor Abd al-Karim al-Khadhar, were detained on 17 February 2011. HRW stated that the five "appear to have been detained solely for trying to create a party whose professed aims included greater democracy and protection for human rights." Prior to his own arrest, al-Khadhar stated that his colleagues were apparently held in ʽUlaysha Prison.

Khaled al-Johani, who was detained on 11 March 2011 in Riyadh, a would-be "Day of Rage" during the 2011 Saudi Arabian protests, after talking about democracy, freedom, freedom of speech and justice to BBC Arabic Television reporters, has been held since then in ʽUlaysha Prison. He was not allowed contact with his family for the first 58 days of his detention. While al-Johani remained under detention in ʽUlaysha Prison, HRW described him as a "peaceful dissident" and Mohammad al-Qahtani of the Saudi Civil and Political Rights Association said that al-Johani became known online as "the only brave man in Saudi Arabia", because he appeared to be the only person who publicly protested in Saudi Arabia on 11 March, apart from several hundreds of protestors in Qatif, Hofuf and al-Awamiyah.

== Conditions of detention ==
Amnesty International reported the torture allegations of a Yemeni prisoner arrested in 2002 who stated that he was tortured every three to four days over his first 56 days of detention in the prison. He alleged that techniques used against him included being punched "in the face until blood burst out of [his] mouth", being beaten all over his body and "on the soles of the feet and legs while [his] legs were shackled", and "put under the air conditioner for a few hours". He was held at ʽUlaysha for eight months, of which the first 56 days were in a two-metre by one metre size cell. He was then transferred to al-Ha'ir Prison.

== See also ==
- Human rights in Saudi Arabia
- al-Ha'ir Prison
