= Society for Development and Change =

Saudi Arabian human rights non-governmental organisation

- Purpose: human rights for everyone including Shi'ites
- Region served: Eastern Province, Saudi Arabia
- Key people: secretary-general: Ahmed Mohammad al-Rebh (in exile in Beirut) Ahmad al-Rayah, spokesperson

The Society for Development and Change (Arabic: جمعية التنمية والتغيير), or SDC, is a Saudi Arabian human rights non-governmental organisation that became active in 2011, campaigning for equal human rights for Shia in Eastern Province, Saudi Arabia. The organisation called for a constitution and an elected legislature for Eastern Province.

== Leadership ==
As of October 2011, the SDC secretary-general was Ahmed Mohammad al-Rebh (or al-Ribh). Prior to the creation of the organisation, al-Rebh, an activist from Qatif, had called for political reform and opposed discrimination and had spent time in exile in Iran. In April 2010, al-Rebh had been interrogated by the Qatif branch of Mabahith about his political writing, which included a call for King Abdullah to create a legislative assembly similar to those of Kuwait and Bahrain and criticism of anti-Shi'a discrimination in government policy.

== Actions ==
The Society for Development and Change contacted international media to report on events in the Qatif region during the 2011–2012 Saudi Arabian protests. In October 2011, it reported protestors' demands to create a constitution and independent legislative assembly for Eastern Province. Secretary-General Ahmed Mohammad al-Rebh stated that Saudi Arabians should "be part of the Arab Spring". Al-Rebh was forced into exile in Beirut because of having been forbidden to take part in political activity in Saudi Arabia.

In October 2011, spokesperson Ahmad al-Rayah flew to Beirut to report on the situation in Eastern Province. He stated that he wished for the Society for Development and Change to be legally registered. Al-Rayah said that although protests for democracy and civil rights had taken place since February 2011, security forces did not fire live bullets against protestors until 3 October, when they "fired live rounds directly into a crowd" around a police station in al-Awamiyah.

The Society for Development and Change ran the www.altaghyir.com website during 2011.

== See also ==
- Human rights in Saudi Arabia
