= Khaled al-Johani =

Saudi Arabian dissident

- خالد بن محمد بن عبيد الجريسي الجهني
- Born: 23 August 1971 (age 55)
- Occupation: Teacher of religious instruction
- Known for: Publicly asking for freedoms and democracy in Saudi Arabia during the 2011–2012 Saudi Arabian protests
- Criminal charges: Support of demonstrations, presence at the location of a demonstration, and communications with the foreign media in a manner that harmed the reputation of the Kingdom of Saudi Arabia
- Criminal status: Imprisoned without charges or trial for nearly one year at ʽUlaysha Prison

Khaled al-Johani (also al-Jehani, Arabic:الجهني خالد , born 23 August 1971) is a teacher of religious instruction in Riyadh, Saudi Arabia. He was imprisoned, without charge or trial for nearly one year, at ʽUlaysha Prison for having publicly asked for freedoms and democracy in Saudi Arabia – an absolute monarchy – during the 2011–2012 Saudi Arabian protests. His public statement was made to a BBC Arabic Television team on a street in Riyadh in the presence of security forces. On 22 February 2012 he was charged in a court for al-Qaeda suspects and a trial date set for April 2012. Al-Johani is an Amnesty International prisoner of conscience as of February 2012.

== 11 March 2011 ==
After the Arab Spring revolutions in Tunisia and Egypt in early 2011, some protests took place in Saudi Arabia. A "Day of Rage" was proposed for Saudi Arabia for 11 March 2011. On that day, hundreds of people protested in Qatif, al-Awamiyah and Hofuf, but in Riyadh, the police presence was "overwhelming" by early morning, with large numbers of police cars present and helicopters that "crisscrossed the skies all day".

Khaled al-Johani is the only person known to have reached the site of the public street protests in Riyadh or Jeddah on that day. He walked past BBC Arabic Television journalists twice and both times was threatened by police that he would be imprisoned if he walked past the journalists, who were accompanied by state escorts, a third time. He stated, "I'm here to say we need democracy, we need freedom. We need to speak freely. We will reach out, the government doesn't own us. I was afraid to speak, but no more. We don't have dignity, we don't have justice!" He stated that there is no freedom of the press in Saudi Arabia, since it is an absolute monarchy, and that living a dignified life in Saudi Arabia depends on an individual's connection and the mercy of al-Saud princes. After stating his opinion, al-Johani stated his worry that he would be detained before returning home and said that the journalists could visit him at al-Ha'ir or ʽUlaysha Prison.

== Imprisonment and fame ==
Al-Johani was detained after he returned home and was not allowed any contact with his family for 58 days. Al-Johani was held at ʽUlaysha Prison. After visiting al-Johani in May, family members said that he had lost weight and was depressed. AOL News said that al-Johani became a "folk hero in the blink of an eye" when the BBC broadcast al-Johani's full statement in April and a six-minute video "Where is Khaled?" was uploaded to YouTube. According to Mohammad al-Qahtani of the Saudi Civil and Political Rights Association, al-Johani became known online as "the only brave man in Saudi Arabia". He was held without trial for nearly a year. In February 2012, Amnesty International considered him to be a prisoner of conscience. Al-Johani was given a temporary, 48 hours' release starting on 25 July 2012.

=== Court case ===
On 22 February 2012, al-Johani appeared before the Specialized Criminal Court in Riyadh, a court used to try suspected terrorists (such as members of Al-Qaeda in the Arabian Peninsula), but also used to try peaceful dissidents and human rights activists.

Al-Johani was charged with "support of demonstrations, presence at the location of a demonstration, and communications with the foreign media in a manner that harmed the reputation of the Kingdom of Saudi Arabia." His case was adjourned to April 2012.

Al-Johani had no access to a lawyer between his arrest and his 22 February court appearance. He was permitted to contact a lawyer following the court appearance.

On 22 February, Philip Luther of Amnesty International criticised the trial, stating "The fact that he is appearing before a court that was originally established to handle terrorism-related charges only adds insult to injury. This trial is utterly unwarranted. We call on the Saudi authorities to release him and others held on similar charges immediately and unconditionally." In February 2012, Amnesty International called for al-Johani to be released "immediately and unconditionally". The trial was expected to continue after al-Johani's 25 July 2012 temporary release.

According to Eman al-Nafjan, writing in June 2014, al-Johani's total imprisonment was for two years.

== See also ==
- Manal al-Sharif
