= 2011 Saudi Arabian municipal elections =

- 29 September 2011

1,056 seats in 285 municipalities

Municipal elections in Saudi Arabian towns and cities, initially planned for 31 October 2009, were held on 29 September 2011 (a week after the initial date of 22 September 2011). Women were not allowed to participate in the elections. Women campaigned for the right to participate in the official elections and planned to create parallel municipal councils.

== Background ==
Municipal elections were originally planned to be held on 31 October 2009 in Saudi Arabia. The elections were not held in 2009. Governmental authorities stated that the delay was caused by the need to "expand the electorate and study the possibility of allowing women to vote." Associated Press described the announcement that an election would be held in 2011 as having "coincided with rumblings of dissent in Saudi Arabia stemming from the wave of political unrest in the Arab world." On 22–23 March 2011, officials of the Ministry of Municipal and Rural affairs announced that the elections would be held on 22 September 2011.

Half of the local council seats were to be decided in the election and the other half were to be appointed. The councils have "little power".

== Electoral process ==
Voter registration took place from 23 April to 19 May or 28 July. Candidate registration took place from 28 May to 2 June.

The period of electoral campaigning was to be decided after candidate registration had closed. The municipal councils were to be created in October, following the election, for a term of 6 years.

== Electoral commission ==
The Ministry of Municipal and Rural affairs set up an 11-member electoral commission, headed by Abdul-Rahman al-Dahmash and an executive committee that "will facilitate the operations of the special electoral commission, and [will] take all the necessary measures to ensure the success of the municipal elections."

== Women's participation ==
In late March, the Ministry of Municipal and Rural affairs stated that women would not vote in the 2011 elections "because of the kingdom's social customs". King Saud University history lecturer and human rights activist Hatoon al-Fassi involved in campaigning for women's participation in elections stated that women had decided to create their own municipal councils in parallel to the men-only elections. Al-Fassi stated that women creating their own municipal councils or participating in "real elections" were both legal under Saudi law and electoral commission head al-Dahmash agreed with her.

Saudi Arabian women organised through the "Baladi" (My Country) and Saudi Women's Revolution to campaign for women's participation in the election. From 23–25 April, women in Jeddah, Riyadh and Dammam tried to register as electors. The Gulf News said that "strong public opinion ... supporting women's participation in the election process" followed local newspapers' publication of photos of women waiting in queues to register for the election. Fawzia Al Hani, chair of the "Baladi" Facebook campaign, said that Saudi Arabian law states that women have the right to vote and to stand as candidates.

One of the women whose registration had been rejected, Samar Badawi, filed a lawsuit in the Grievances Board, a non-Sharia court, against the Ministry of Municipal and Rural affairs, claiming that there was no law banning women as voters or candidates and that the refusal was illegal. She cited Articles 3 and 24 of the Arab Charter on Human Rights, which refer to general and election-specific anti-discrimination, respectively. Badawi requested the Grievances Board to suspend the electoral procedures pending the Board's decision and to order the electoral authorities to register her as a voter and as eligible to be a candidate. On 27 April 2011, the Grievances Board accepted to hear her case at a later date. The Board's final decision was that Badawi's case was "premature". According to the United States Department of State, Badawi was the first person to file a lawsuit for women's suffrage in Saudi Arabia.

Badawi also applied to the Municipal Elections Appeal Committee to reverse the refusal of her registration. Her application was refused on the grounds that appeals against registration refusals must take place within three days of the refusal.

In an annual speech on 25 September 2011 before the Shura Council, King Abdullah stated that Saudi women would be able to run and cast ballots in the 2015 municipal elections.

== Results ==
The elections covered 1056 seats in the councils of 285 municipalities around Saudi Arabia.

== See also ==
- List of cities and towns in Saudi Arabia
- Women's suffrage
