= Basic Law of Saudi Arabia =

Constitution-like charter divided into nine chapters

The Basic Law of Saudi Arabia (alternative name: Basic System of Governance; Arabic: النظام الأساسي للحكم, romanized: al-Nidham al-Asasi lil-Hukm) is a constitution-like charter divided into nine chapters, consisting of 83 articles. The Basic Law (in Article One) states that the constitution of Saudi Arabia is "the Holy Quran, and the Sunnah (Traditions)" of the Islamic prophet Muhammad. However, the Basic Law contains many characteristics of what might be called a constitution in other countries ("The Law of Governance", "Rights and Duties"). The Basic Law is per the Sunni Salafi School understanding of Islamic law.

== History ==
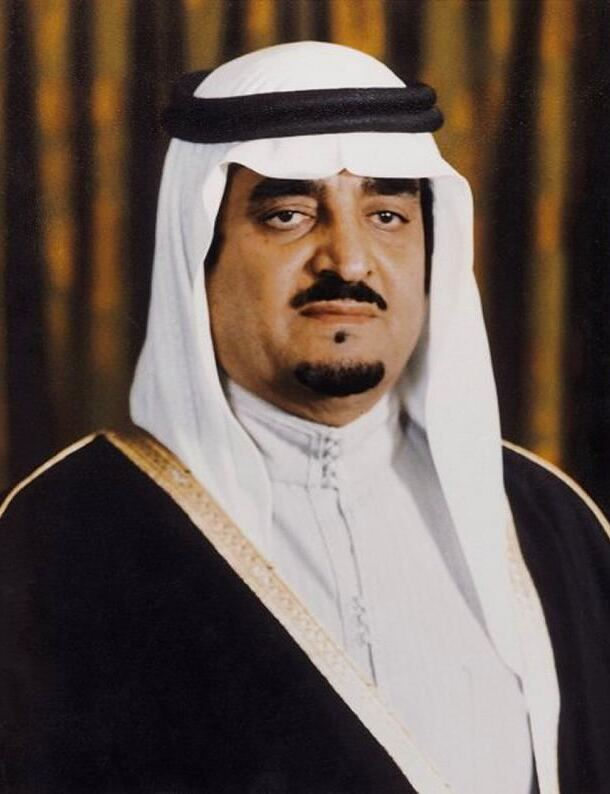
King Fahd introduced the Basic Law in 1992.

Following the Iraqi invasion of Kuwait and the First Gulf War, King Fahd issued a royal decree that was published in official television and newspapers on 31 January 1992. The Decree stated the following:

Royal Decree No. A/90
27/8/1412 AH

By the Help of God,
We, Fahd bin Abdulaziz, the King of the Kingdom of Saudi Arabia, consistent with the public interest, and in view with the development of the State in different fields, in addition to our enthusiasm to achieve our prospected objectives, we ordered the following:
First: Issue the Basic System of Governance according to the context herein below.

Second: Act in accordance with all the systems, orders, and resolutions that are currently adopted, until they are amended pursuant to the Basic System of Governance.

Third: The Basic System of Governance shall be published in the official journal and shall be enforceable as of the date of its publication.

Saudi cultural and religious views stigmatize any reference to "Constitution" other than the Qur'an and the practice of Muhammad. Article 1 of the Basic Law emphasize that "God's Book (Quran) and the Sunna of his Prophet (Muhammad), are its (Saudi Arabia) constitution". Prince Talal bin Abdulaziz said that there cannot be "a constitution, a regulation, or a law that runs counter to the Islamic Sharia" in Saudi Arabia.

== Articles of the Basic Law of Governance ==
=== Chapter 1: General Principles ===
Article 1 states that "God's Book and the Sunnah of His Prophet" are the country's constitution and Arabic is the official language with the capital at Riyadh.

=== Chapter 2: Monarchy ===
Article 7 proclaims the rights of the monarch. Next, per Article 8, "justice, consultation, and equality" shall be in accordance with Sharia.

=== Chapter 3: Features of the Saudi family ===
Article 9 states that all members of each family in Saudi Arabia shall be reared "on the basis of the Islamic faith."

=== Chapter 4: Economic Principles ===
Article 18 guards the private property of citizens.

Article 21 calls for an "alms tax".

=== Chapter 5: Rights and Duties ===
Article 27 establishes a "system of social security"; It has become feasible without expropriation and high taxes due to the large supplies of oil and a population of 33 million people. Article 39 requires all media outlets to conform to "the state's regulations," and explicitly forbids any act that "foster(s) sedition or division," which is often cited in censorship cases.

=== Chapter 6: The Authorities of the State ===
==== Islam as cornerstone of governance ====
Article 45 affirms that religious rulings must be in accordance with the "Holy Qur'an and the Prophet's Sunna." To this end, a panel of Islamic clergy and research group shall be established.

According to Article 55, the king must "rule according to the traditions of Islam and shall supervise the application of Sharia." Article 56 states that the king is also the prime minister. Article 57 makes it clear that the king's cabinet and other lower-ranking officials must follow Islam. Those who deviate from this can be dismissed or punished.

==== Military ====
Articles 60–62: The king is the commander-in-chief and is endowed with powers concerning war and the national security of the country

=== Chapter 7: Financial Affairs ===
Article 71 specifies that revenue is entered and spent according to rules of statutes which will be published regularly in the Official Gazette per Article 70.

=== Chapter 8: Control Bodies ===
Article 79–80 concerns control bodies. Control bodies will be established to ensure good financial and administrative management of state assets.

=== Chapter 9: General Provisions ===
Article 82 makes it clear that a temporary state of emergency during turmoil cannot violate Article 7 (Qur'an and sunnah).

== Criticism ==
The Basic Law was drafted by an ad hoc committee of the interior ministry, which Human Rights Watch accuses of egregious violations of human rights.

In the eighteenth century Muhammad bin Saud and Muhammad ibn Abdul Wahhab integrated all the political and religious institutions into one governing body. The government of Saudi Arabia reserves numerous jobs for the clergy that range from preaching to judgeships.

Islamic clergy (ulema) such as muftis and sheikhs, who dominate Saudi Arabian legal positions, make use of the Basic Law in addition to the Qur'an, hadith, sunnah, and Islamic jurisprudence which all fall within Sharia.

The Basic Law makes no mention of women; Amnesty International write in their 2000 report on Saudi Arabia:

Discussion of discrimination against women and their status as second class citizens has for a long time been a taboo, untouchable even by the highest of state authorities in the country despite all the misery and suffering of women for no reason other than their having been born female.

== See also ==
- Legal system of Saudi Arabia
