= Mabahith =

Secret police of Saudi Arabia

General Directorate of Investigations المديرية العامة للمباحث
- Seal of the Mabahith

- Flag of the Mabahith
- Common name: Mabahith
- Motto: A homeland we don't protect, we don't deserve to live in

Agency overview
- Formed: October 14, 1924; 102 years ago as General Directorate of Public Security

Jurisdictional structure
- Operations jurisdiction: Saudi Arabia
- General nature: Secret police

Operational structure
- Headquarters: Riyadh, Saudi Arabia
- Agency executives: Ahmed bin Abdul Aziz Al-Issa, Director; Lt. Gen. Abdullah al-Qarni, Deputy Director
- Parent agency: Presidency of State Security; Ministry of Interior (Until 2017)

The General Directorate of Investigations (Arabic: المديرية العامة للمباحث), commonly known simply as the Mabahith, is the secret police agency of the Presidency of State Security in Saudi Arabia, and deals with domestic security and counter-intelligence.

The officers of the Mabahith have delegated powers to investigate, survey, and detain individuals who are deemed to be "threats to national security". The Mabahith has conducted a wide variety of security operations that have led to the arrest of high profile terrorists, and opposition members that have been accused of causing internal unrest. Officially, the Mabahith are to turn over arrested individuals to the Saudi courts for sentencing. The Mabahith have been used by the government of Saudi Arabia to monitor political opposition and individuals they deem to be threatening to Saudi society. The organization has been criticized by the United Nations, Amnesty International, and Human Rights Watch.

== Role ==
According to Human Rights Watch, the Mabahith "monitors suspected political opponents and others, targets individuals for arrest, and interrogates detainees. Mabahith agents operate with impunity and have been responsible for a wide range of human rights abuses, including arbitrary arrest, incommunicado detention, and torture" including waterboarding, denailing, flagellation and beatings, amongst other forms of severe abuse.

Members of the Mabahith were allegedly responsible for the torture of Western detainees arrested during a car bombing campaign which started in 2000. Two members in particular, Khalid al-Saleh and Ibrahim al-Dali, were named by William Sampson in his court action against the Saudi government, Sampson and others lost their case in the UK High Court when the Saudis used the State Immunity Act 1978 as their defence.

== Directors ==
- Ali bin Hassan Al-Sayrafi (1965 - 1967)
- Fayez bin Mohammed Al-Aufi (1967 - 1969)
- Ahmed bin Saleh Mansour (1969 - 1971)
- Abdulaziz bin Masoud Ismail (1972 - 1986)
- Saleh bin Taha bin Saleh Khasifan (1986 - 2002)
- Mahmoud bin Mohammed Bakhsh (2002 - 2006)
- AbdulAziz bin Mohammed Al-Howairini (2006 - 2022)
- Ahmed bin Abdul Aziz Al-Issa (2022 - Present)

== Prisons ==
=== Al-Ha'ir Prison ===
Al-Ha'ir Prison is a Mabahith-affiliated prison. The Mabahith have conducted classified interviews as well as interrogations of high profile Al-Qaeda members being held in the prison.

=== ʽUlaysha Prison ===
Mabahith runs the ʽUlaysha Prison in Riyadh, where it holds prisoners under arbitrary detention. The United Nations Working Group on Arbitrary Detention has objected to arbitrary detention at Mabahith's prison. As of June 2011, arbitrarily detained prisoners apparently include five founding members of a would-be political party, the Umma Islamic Party, and Khaled al-Johani, who publicly protested in Riyadh on the 11 March "Day of Rage" during the 2011 Saudi Arabian protests. Political prisoners living in exile have testified that Mabahith agents used illegal interrogation methods and tortured political dissidents who were being held arbitrarily in the prison.

=== Dhahban Central Prison ===
Dhahban Central Prison is used for arbitrary detention. According to the Human Rights Watch report, women activists – who have been detained since May 2018 – were taken to Dhahban and tortured in a room called an "officer's guesthouse". Reportedly, the men who tortured these women were from "cyber security" – a reference to officers working under Saud al-Qahtani, who was fired for his involvement in the killing of journalist Jamal Khashoggi.

== See also ==
- General Intelligence Presidency (Al Mukhabarat Al A'amah) – Saudi Foreign intelligence agency
- Presidency of State Security
