= Umma Islamic Party =

Umma Islamic Party حزب الأمة الإسلامي
- Leader: Dr. Abdullah al-Salim
- Founded: 10 February 2011
- Headquarters: Riyadh
- Ideology: Islamism; Reformism; Shura

Website
- islamicommaparty.org

The Umma Islamic Party (Arabic: حزب الأمة الإسلامي) is a political party in Saudi Arabia that was formed on 10 February 2011 in response to the Arab Spring. Formed by a collective of opposition members including Islamists and intellectuals, the party is pro-reform and demands representation and an end to absolute monarchy in the country. The party is run by a 10-member coordination committee and requested official recognition from the government as an official party. On 18 February 2011, most of the party co-founders were arrested by Saudi authorities. All except for Sheikh Abd al-ʽAziz al-Wuhaibi were released later in 2011, subject to travel and teaching bans, after agreeing in writing not to carry out "anti-government activity".

== Creation in 2011 ==
The Umma Islamic Party was created on 9 February 2011 by an 11-member coordination committee of Islamists and intellectuals including Dr. Abdullah Alsalim, Dr. Ahmad bin Sa'd al-Ghamidi, Sheikh Abd al-ʽAziz al-Wuhaibi and Sheikh Muhammad bin Husain al-Qahtani. The party is pro-reform and demands representation and an end to absolute monarchy in the country. The party requested official recognition from the government as an official party.

The Umma Islamic Party was part of the Umma Conference network headquartered in Istanbul, led by the Kuwait Hizb al-Umma and chaired by Hakim al-Mutayri, until it severed its ties in 2017 for increasing tutelage and lack of autonomy, though retaining its program in a revised edition.

== 2011 detentions ==
Al-Ghamidi, al-Dughaithir, al-Wuhaibi, al-Qahtani, al-Ghamidi, al-Majid and al-Khadhar were detained on 17 February 2011. Human Rights Watch stated that they "[appeared] to have been detained solely for trying to create a party whose professed aims included greater democracy and protection for human rights." Prior to his own arrest, al-Khadhar stated that his colleagues were apparently held in the Mabahith's ʽUlaysha Prison. The detained party co-founders were told that they would be released only if they signed a pledge to stop advocating for political reform, which they initially refused.

All except for al-Wuhaibi were conditionally released in 2011 after signing declarations that they would not carry out "anti-government activity". The release conditions included travel and teaching bans.

== Aftermath ==
As the party was never approved and all political parties are illegal under Saudi law, the party was never actually formed, only requested and therefore there was nothing to officially disband. However, as mentioned earlier the arrests and release conditions banned the leadership from pursuing the matter further. Additionally, the Saudi government did not stop there, they continued to prosecute anyone who had a role in setting up the party as recently as 2016, when a man was sentenced to prison for his role in aiding the founding of the party and challenging the monarchy.

== See also ==
- List of political parties in Saudi Arabia
- Hizb ut-Tahrir
- Muslim Brotherhood
- Movement for Islamic Reform in Arabia
