= BBC News Arabic =

BBC News Arabic بي بي سي نيوز عربي
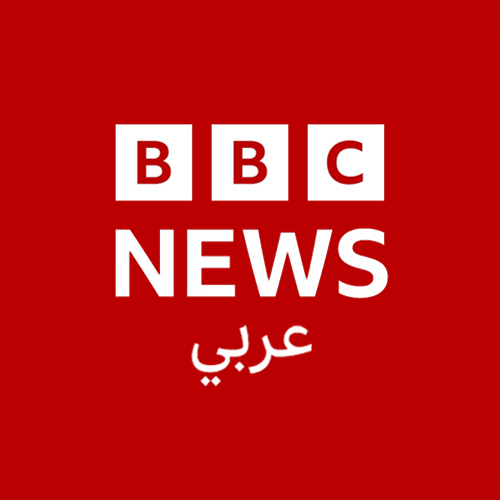
- Logo used on its website
- Country: United Kingdom; Saudi Arabia
- Broadcast area: Arab world Horn of Africa; International (via internet)
- Network: BBC World Service
- Headquarters: Broadcasting House, London

Programming
- Language: Literary Arabic
- Picture format: 720p60 (16:9 HDTV)

Ownership
- Owner: BBC
- Sister channels: BBC News

History
- Launched: 11 March 2008; 18 years ago
- Former names: BBC Arabic Television (1994–1996)

Links
- Website: bbc.com/arabic

Availability

Streaming media
- BBC Online: Watch live
- Sling TV: Internet Protocol television

BBC News Arabic (Arabic: بي بي سي نيوز عربي), formerly BBC Arabic Television, is a television news channel broadcast to the Arab world by the BBC. It was launched on 11 March 2008. It is run by the BBC World Service.

== History ==
In 1994, the original BBC Arabic Television was launched by Rome-based Orbit Communications Company (owned by King Fahd's cousin, Prince Khalid ibn Abdullah) and a subsidiary of the Saudi Arabian Mawarid Holding. On 21 April 1996, it was "pulled off the air" following an episode of Panorama that was critical of the Saudi Arabian government. Ian Richardson, who set up the news department during that time blamed the short life of the channel on a clash with the owners over content.

During the short life of BBC Arabic Television, there were several angry ‘liaison meetings’ with Orbit and the guarantees of editorial independence proved to be a sour joke, only barely obscured by a thin smokescreen about the BBC's alleged failure to observe "cultural sensitivities" – Saudi code for anything not to the Royal Family's liking. When it became clear to Orbit and Mawarid that it had, in their terms, created a monster not prepared to toe the Saudi line, it was only a matter of time before there would be a final parting of the ways.

Many of the staff who worked for the original BBC Arabic Television service were eventually employed by Al Jazeera, now one of BBC Arabic Television's main competitors.

Plans to relaunch the channel were announced in October 2005 and broadcasting was to start in Autumn 2007, but was delayed until 2008. The channel eventually relaunched at 09:56 GMT on 11 March 2008, with the first news bulletin airing at 10:00. Launch plans for the new TV output were drawn up by Jerry Timmins as part of a multi-media strategy for BBC Arabic. Initially broadcasting for 12 hours a day, BBC Arabic extended its airtime to 24 hours a day on 19 January 2009.

== Funding ==
BBC Arabic Television is run by the BBC World Service. Initially it was funded from a grant-in-aid from the British Foreign Office but in 2014 funding was switched to come from the television licence that is mainly used to fund the BBC's domestic broadcasting. The service is based in the Peel Wing of Broadcasting House in London.

In 2011, as the British government cut funding to the BBC, leading the BBC World Service to close down its services in five languages, the government simultaneously increased funding to the BBC Arabic service, in the words of Foreign Secretary William Hague, to "assist the BBC Arabic Service to continue their valuable work in the region".

== Service ==
BBC Arabic can also be seen on the official website of the BBC Arabic service.

The channel broadcasts 24 hours a day, showing live news programmes mixed with current affairs programmes, documentaries and occasional light entertainment.

BBC news bulletins of either 30 or 60 minutes in duration are broadcast throughout the day, covering stories by journalists and correspondents around the world. Newshour, an hour-long news bulletin is broadcast every evening at 18:00 GMT.

Other daily programmes are Nuqtat Hewar (16:06 GMT, a phone-in programme), and BBC Trending (15:00 GMT, looking at the news agenda from a social media perspective).
