= Timeline of the 2011–2012 Saudi Arabian protests (from July 2012) =

2011–2012 Saudi Arabian protests
- Part of Qatif conflict and the Arab Spring
- Date: 11 March 2011 – 24 December 2012 (1 year, 11 months and 3 days)
- Location: Saudi Arabia; 24.65°N 46.767°E
- Caused by: Prisoners held without trial; Inequality for women; Corruption; High unemployment; Discrimination against Shias; Saudi troops intervention in Bahrain; Inspiration from concurrent regional protests; Arrest of Nimr al-Nimr
- Goals: Political and economic changes; Women's suffrage; Women's right to drive; Release of political prisoners; Deportation of Peninsula Shield Force from Bahrain; Equality for Shias; Constitution and independent legislative assembly in Eastern Province; Release of Nimr al-Nimr
- Methods: Demonstrations; Self-immolation; Internet activism
- Result: Saudi government victory
- Concessions: US$130,000,000,000 to benefit citizens; Municipal elections held on 29 September 2011; Women to participate in 2015 municipal elections and be nominated to Consultative Assembly; Partial shift from imprisonment without trial to imprisonment with trial; King Khalid University president fired on 1 July 2012

Parties
Opposition; Coalition for Freedom and Justice; Women to drive movement; Saudi Civil and Political Rights Association; Human Rights First Society; Asharq Center for Human Rights; Committee for the Defense of Human Rights in the Arabian Peninsula; Society for Development and Change; Association for the Protection and Defense of Women's Rights in Saudi Arabia; Umma Islamic Party; Supported by: United States; Iran	(Saudi Arabia) Government; Ministry of Interior; General Directorate of Public Security; General Directorate of Investigations

Lead figures
Human Rights Defenders: Manal al-Sharif (Co-founder of Women to drive movement); Mohammad Fahad al-Qahtani (Leader and co-founder of the Saudi Civil and Political Rights Association); Wajeha al-Huwaider (Co-founder of Association for the Protection and Defense of Women's Rights in Saudi Arabia); Independent Opposition leaders: Faisal Ahmed Abdul-Ahad (Facebook Activist); Nimr al-Nimr (executed) (Shia Sheikh); Hatoon al-Fassi (Female suffrage activist); Morsi al-Rebh † (Shia Activist)	King Abdullah; King of Saudi Arabia; Prince Salman; Crown Prince of Saudi Arabia; Prince Nayef; Crown Prince of Saudi Arabia (until June 2012); Prince Muhammad; Interior Minister

Number
Protesters:	Thousands
Online campaign:	26,000

Casualties and losses
Deaths:	36
Injuries:	100+
Arrests:	Riyadh: 50; East Province: 952
Deaths:	13 identified
Injuries:	Unknown

The following is a timeline of the 2011–2012 Saudi Arabian protests since July 2012. The 2011–2012 Saudi Arabian protests are a series of ongoing protests taking place in Saudi Arabia, which began in January 2011, influenced by concurrent protests in the region.

In July 2012, Amnesty International protested in the United Nations Human Rights Council against legal persecution of Saudi Civil and Political Rights Association (ACPRA) leaders. Protests calling for prisoners to be freed and protesting against the Saudi government occurred in Buraidah on 23 July and in front of the Ministry of Interior in Riyadh on 25 July, in Riyadh and Mecca on 28 July, in Ta'if, in Buraidah, near al-Ha'ir Prison and in Dammam in August.

In July and August 2012, protests in the Qatif region intensified after Sheikh Nimr al-Nimr was wounded in the leg and arrested by police on 8 July. Three men were killed in a protest on the evening of the arrest. Funerals and protests took place on 10 July, 11 July and 13 July, including chants calling for the downfall of the House of Saud. Another protester was shot dead in the 13 July al-Awamiyah protest. While detained, al-Nimr was tortured, had bruises on his face and broken teeth, and started a hunger strike. Protest organisers in al-Awamiyah stated their support for al-Nimr and insisted on the use of nonviolent resistance. Protester Mohamed al-Shakhouri was shot in the back and neck and arrested in a 26–27 July protest calling for al-Nimr's release. Further protests called for all Shia and Sunni detainees to be freed, including al-Shakhouri. A protester and a soldier were fatally shot in Qatif during a 3–4 August evening human rights protest, leading to several more protests.

== July 2012 ==
=== 1 July ===
Following students' protests at King Khalid University in early March, the president of the university, Abdullah al-Rashid, was replaced by Abdulrahman al-Dawood on 1 July by King Abdullah.

=== 3 July ===
On 3 July, Amnesty International protested to the United Nations Human Rights Council against the court trial of Mohammad Fahad al-Qahtani and the arrest and sentencing of Mohammed al-Bejadi to four years' imprisonment, both prosecuted for their activities as leaders of the Saudi Civil and Political Rights Association (ACPRA). Amnesty International said that "Saudi Arabian authorities are engaged in a campaign to cow Saudi Arabian human rights defenders into silence" and that "instead of repressing leading human rights defenders, the Saudi Arabian authorities should be investigating the human rights violations they have documented."

=== 8 July ===
On 8 July near Qatif, Sheikh Nimr al-Nimr was shot by police in the leg and was arrested for his political activities according to his brother and police. Thousands of people protested in response. Akbar al-Shakhouri, Mohamed al-Felfel and a third man were killed in the protest. Pictures of al-Nimr "covered with what appeared to be a blood-stained white blanket" were published online by Eastern Province activists. Activists said that al-Shakhouri and al-Felfel were killed by rooftop police snipers. The Ministry of Interior denied the claim.

=== 9 July ===
Princess Sara bint Talal bin Abdulaziz Al Saud, niece of King Abdullah of Saudi Arabia, applied for political asylum in the United Kingdom on 9 July.

=== 10 July ===
From a thousand to ten thousand people participated in Qatif city on 10 July in a funeral for Mohamed al-Felfel and a protest against the killings. A hundred people protested on Tarout Island. Security forces shot live bullets against protesters in the Qatif and Tarout Island protests. Participants chanted, "Down with Muhammad bin Fahd" and "Down with the House of Saud".

Ministry of Interior spokesperson Mansour al-Turki stated, "Some trouble-seekers took advantage of the gathering to hide in their midst and divert the context of this event which led the security forces to do their duty to keep the peace and ensure the safety of those participating in the funeral procession."

=== 11 July ===
Ten thousand people participated in a funeral for al-Shakhouri was held in al-Awamiyah on 11 July. Participants chanted "Down with the House of Saud", "Down with Mohammed bin Fahd" and "Qatif and Bahrain are one people" and carried Bahraini flags.

Activists said to Thomson Reuters that Nimr al-Nimr was being held in Riyadh.

=== 13 July ===
A protest took place in al-Awamiyah on 13 July calling for al-Nimr to be released. Abdallah Ja'far al-Ojami was killed by police bullets. Ministry of Interior spokesperson Mansour al-Turki described the police shooting as a response to a Molotov cocktail and gunfire attack on the police station. Al-Awamiyah residents interviewed for Rasid.com described the police claim as unrealistic, stating that the police station is "well protected with concrete barriers and fences". Activists interviewed by Al Jazeera English stated that al-Ojami "had been walking by the police station and had not participated in any attack". According to Saudi scholar Ali al-Ahmed, al-Ojama was shot "while walking in the street of [al-Awamiyah]; he was shot by a sniper, by [a] special forces sniper, about half a kilometre away from the police station. He was captured, he was brought to the station bleeding and they actually beat him up and let him die."

=== 14 July ===
A protest calling for political prisoners to be freed occurred in Buraidah on 14 July. Ten women, relatives of Saleh al-Moteq, a political prisoner, were detained.

On the same day, a conflict between pro-government and anti-government prisoners occurred in al-Ha'ir Prison. Security forces intervened. Saudi authorities said that nobody was injured.

=== 16 July ===
On 16 July, activist Hamza al-Hassan stated that al-Nimr had received a brief visit by his family during which officials stated that the purpose of the visit was to request al-Nimr's family to "calm the angry protestors". According to al-Hassan, al-Nimr had been tortured, and he had bruises on his face and broken teeth.

=== 19 July ===
On 19 July, al-Nimr's family said that al-Nimr had started a hunger strike.

On the same day, 180 Filipinos working in Saudi Arabia started a series of hunger strikes in Riyadh to protest against "illegal recruitment, abusive employers, and government neglect". "The Filipino workers complained of many contract violations, including high fees, poor accommodation and underpayment or nonpayment of salaries over 10 months to a year." Garry Martinez of Migrante International said that earlier protests in February 2012 had resulted in payment of unpaid wages to some of the workers.

=== 22 July ===
Al-Nimr's family visited him again on 22 July. They stated that he had been badly tortured, with signs of torture on his head, that he was continuing his hunger strike, and that he had weakened.

=== 23 July ===
A protest calling for political prisoners in al-Ha'ir Prison to be released and criticising the Saudi Arabian government took place in Buraidah on 23 July.

=== 25 July ===
Khaled al-Johani, who was imprisoned since his appearance at the 11 March 2011 "Day of Rage" protest in Riyadh, was given a temporary, 48 hours' release. His trial at the Specialized Criminal Court in Riyadh, a court used for trying suspected members of Al-Qaeda in the Arabian Peninsula, is expected to continue.

A protest calling for political prisoners to be released and opposing the Saudi Arabian government took place in Riyadh in front of the Ministry of Interior on 25 July.

=== 26–27 July ===
On 26 July, an al-Awamiyah youth movement called for participation in a "We are all leopards (نمور, 'nimrs')" rally in support of al-Nimr. The group insisted on the use of nonviolent resistance, arguing that Saudi authorities wished to use protesters' violent actions as a legal basis for repressing the youth movement and of destroying international support for the movement.

The Qatif area "We are all leopards ('nimrs')" protest march took place on the evening of 26 July, from Revolution Street to Imam Ali Street, with 2000 participants according to protest organisers and 300 according to Ministry of Interior spokesperson Mansour al-Turki. The demonstrators called for al-Nimr's release and for the release of other detainees.

Following the protest march, "armoured vehicles started entering the city [and] protesters began to block roads with flaming tyres and throw Molotov cocktails". Security forces in the vehicles shot live ammunition at protesters after midnight, injuring 14 people, including Mohamed al-Shakhouri, according to witnesses interviewed by Thomson Reuters and Agence France Presse (AFP). Al-Shakhouri had bullet wounds in his back and neck according to the AFP witnesses. He was arrested and taken to a Dhahran military hospital. Ten others were also arrested. Mansour al-Turki stated that "there was no live firing and there weren't any injuries" and claimed that the arrests were unrelated to the political protest.

=== 28 July ===
Protests calling for political prisoners to be released and opposing the government took place in Riyadh and Mecca on 28 July.

=== 30–31 July ===
On the evening of 30 and 31 July 2000 people attended a funeral in Safwa for al-Nimr's wife, Muna Jabir al-Shariyavi, who had died in a New York hospital. Security forces tried to control details of the funeral. Funeral participants called for al-Nimr to be unconditionally freed, for all Shia and Sunni detainees to be freed, and chanted "Down with Hamad", "Bahrain Free Free, Peninsula Shield out".

== August 2012 ==
=== 1–2 August ===
On 1 August, the family of Mohamed Kazem Jaafar al-Shakhouri, arrested after the 26–27 July Qatif demonstration in support of al-Nimr, issued an appeal calling for family access, access to a lawyer and a fair trial for al-Shakhouri. In the evening, a demonstration calling for al-Shakhouri to be released took place.

=== 3–4 August ===
A human rights protest took place in Qatif on the evening of 3 August, with the death of a protester and a soldier. According to protesters, security forces shot at the demonstration in Revolution Street using live fire and "targeted everyone riding a motorbike", including Hussain Yusuf al-Qallaf (حسين يوسف القلاف), an 18-year-old from Tarout Island, who was shot in the chest while riding his motorbike about four kilometres away, in al-Shwaika Street. Al-Qallaf died the following day.

Ministry of Interior spokesperson Mansour al-Turki stated that "A security patrol was exposed to heavy fire from four armed rioters on a motorbike when pausing at a street intersection in Qatif" and that soldier Hussein Bawah Ali Zabani died from the shooting.

Another Qatif protest took place on the evening of 4 August.

=== 5–6 August ===
Thousands of people attended a funeral for Hussain Yusuf al-Qallaf in Tarout Island on the evening of 5 August. The mourners protested against the killing and in support of Nimr al-Nimr. Another protest took place in Qatif the following evening.

=== 9 August ===
A protest took place in Ta'if on 9 August calling for the release of political prisoners and opposing human rights violations.

=== 13 August ===
According to a tweet by ACPRA co-founder Mohammad al-Qahtani, female family members of political prisoners held a sit-in in front of al-Ha'ir Prison calling for information about the prisoners' location.

=== 15 August ===
Protests calling for prisoners to be freed occurred in the Eastern Province and in Buraidah on 15 August.

=== 18 August ===
According to a tweet by Mohammad al-Qahtani, a sit-in for calling for political prisoners to be freed was held in Dammam by the prisoners' families.

=== 19 August ===
On 19 August, al-Ha'ir political prisoners' families held a sit-in and were surrounded by riot police. The protesters stated that they would not end the sit-in until they met their imprisoned family members, and that they were willing to be detained in replacement of those imprisoned. The security forces fired live bullets into the air. The families, including 150 men and 60 women, were briefly held by security forces and then released. A similar prisoner release protest took place in Buraidah in the direction of the "Trafyah" prison.

In Qatif, the Asharq Center for Human Rights called for a United Nations fact-finding commission to be sent to Qatif to investigate a month-long surge in armed robberies that took place with Qatif under heavy military occupation, with numerous military checkpoints and security forces present. The Asharq Center described Qatif as being a "closed military zone".

=== 21 August ===
On 21 August, the Asharq Center for Human Rights expressed concern that Nimr al-Nimr was on the 45th day of his hunger strike while in prison and said that he had not been charged. The Asharq Center appealed for international support for allowing access to al-Nimr by his family, lawyer and human rights activists.

=== 23 August ===
A protest rally calling for prisoner release took place in Riyadh, in the direction of al-Ha'ir Prison, on 23 August.

== September 2012 ==
=== 23–30 September ===
Small demonstrations are held by the families of political prisoners "outside prisons and government buildings [against] detentions without trial," including one 100 participating in an action in front of the Saudi Human Rights Commission. Only seven days earlier, a number of Saudi males protested outside a prison near the capital city of Riyadh and were arrested. Abdel Karim Khadr predicted more protests if the government didn't offer solutions.

=== 23 September ===
Khalid al-Labad is shot by police who say he is violent threat while human rights activists call him "a peaceful protester silenced by the government for demanding equal rights for the country's oppressed Shiite Muslim minority."

== October 2012 ==
=== 18 October ===
The Washington Post writes that in Saudi Arabia, "protests occur almost weekly...the marches can be a few dozen protesters carrying photos of the dead and shouting anti-government slogans, or hundreds of people taking over main boulevards."

== November 2012 ==
=== 27 November ===
Just like the protests of 23–30 September, Saudi women, children and men protested outside the Saudi Human Rights Commission to "demand the release of jailed relatives" and such people were arrested. A board member of the ACPRA Mohammed Al-Qahtani at one point this day, told CNN that this demonstration "took place in front of the offices of the Human Rights Commission on King Fahd Road in Riyadh, the country's capital."

== December 2012 ==
=== 24 December ===
A huge march is held in the city of Buraydah led by a woman with a megaphone, going down the street with signs about problems with prisoners in Saudi Arabia and why they should be free.

== Aftermath ==
=== December 2012 ===
Tens of thousands of Saudis protested in the Eastern province of the country against the killing of a teenage demonstrator by state security forces.

=== January 2013 ===
==== 5 January ====
Like the protest in September, 28 people protested in the town of Buraida, holding placards asking about their relatives in prison and how long their sentences would be. Quickly, all of these people were arrested and eventually eleven were detained for committing forbidden acts. By 21 January, according to a report on CNN, all the women arrested had been released.

==== Week of 13 January ====
Over 100 clerics from the town of Qasim sign a petition "demanding that detainees held for security reasons should be given a trial or released," specifically objecting to the "treatment and arrest of the women." These clerics also warned of future protest action.

==== 21 January ====
ABC News local 10 shows a video from CNN of about 2 minutes and thirty seconds of mostly women in Saudi Arabia protesting against detention.

=== February 2013 ===
==== 9–10 February ====
On 9 February, people protested and marched in the capital, Riyadh against those women who had been detained for sitting in front of the Human Rights Society building in the country's capital and they held up slogans against the current Minister of the Interior, Mohammad bin Naif Al Saud.

The next day, there was a peaceful demonstration in Qatif which resented the previous march for inciting the Ministry of the Interior "to practice more violence" in the region of Qatif. They yelled slogans such as "Sunnis or Shiites are all brothers... and this nation won't be given up" and "Not Sunnis not Shiites, but unified Muslims." These protesters also had banners and photos telling for certain detainees like Mohammad AlWad'ani and Khalid AlJuhani to be released.

==== 10 February ====
The Arabic Network for Human Rights Information (ANHRI) releases a statement denouncing:

the arrest of number of women during a protest to demand for the release of their relatives who were arrested since years

without trials or accusations...These demonstrations witnessed several violations as the security forces assaulted the female
demonstrators...[and] harass the passers who were taking pictures of these peaceful demonstration...The process of custody
witnessed several violations...[including] ban[ning] the children from the drinking water...attempt[ing to let]...the
investigation panel to investigate the women without the attendance of a lawyer.

As a result of this statement, ANHRI called for "the immediate release of all the female detainees and respect of freedom of expression and peaceful demonstration." This same day, the Associated Press reported that over 100 people were protesting against detention of people without charge in the country, specifically rallying in the cities of Riyadh and Buraydah.

==== 13 February ====
In a blogpost, Conor Fortune, writing for Amnesty International has one female protester, Abeer al-Sayed, who was arrested in protesting against detention of their loved ones tell the story about her arrest and time in jail.

==== 25 February ====
Starting on 25 February, there was a good amount of protest action in Buraydah related to the demand to free political prisoners. Mostly people participating in such action were women, protesting on a roadsides in a "morning picket," in a grassy field likely near a government building, and other actions including a march down a street.

These protests also included young boys and girls holding signs as well in numerous places across the town. It was reported that at one point, there were over 100 people in front of Alhabeb hospital in Buraydah. A mix of feelings took place between the protesters, some burning a picture of the Minister of the Interior and stepping on it while another held up a sign to dismiss him. There's even a short video on YouTube asking a young girl who the daughter of the prisoner why she's there at the protest. In terms of police presence, at one point it was reported that Saudi Investigation Units were in plain clothing especially after Saudi military forces withdrew.

There was also a sit-in in the city itself which ended up being surrounded by security officers which some felt was unfair and unjust. People were there so long that they even became "hungry, dehydrated & freezing." This could be because it was reported that police closed down all roads to the sit-in site. Specific numbers of this sit-in were confirmed by several tweets of Mohammed Jamjoom, CNN's international correspondent, who noted that 28 women were participating. Also in the first day no arrests were made. Later, as Twitter user, e3teqal_eng noted, Women & children spent the whole night at the site what was being called the "Burayadh sit-in" and they even held their ground. Some helpful others even gave them firewood for the night, so they could stay warm. This fire's embers could even be seen the next morning.

The next morning, people brought them breakfast including some sort of bread and covered food. Even with all the trouble the day before, women in the morning began to come and join the protest.
