= Timeline of the 2011–2012 Saudi Arabian protests (January–June 2012) =

2011–2012 Saudi Arabian protests
- Part of Qatif conflict and the Arab Spring
- Date: 11 March 2011 – 24 December 2012 (1 year, 11 months and 3 days)
- Location: Saudi Arabia; 24.65°N 46.767°E
- Caused by: Prisoners held without trial; Inequality for women; Corruption; High unemployment; Discrimination against Shias; Saudi troops intervention in Bahrain; Inspiration from concurrent regional protests; Arrest of Nimr al-Nimr
- Goals: Political and economic changes; Women's suffrage; Women's right to drive; Release of political prisoners; Deportation of Peninsula Shield Force from Bahrain; Equality for Shias; Constitution and independent legislative assembly in Eastern Province; Release of Nimr al-Nimr
- Methods: Demonstrations; Self-immolation; Internet activism
- Status: Saudi government victory; Occasional protests since 2013
- Concessions: US$130,000,000,000 to benefit citizens; Municipal elections held on 29 September 2011; Women to participate in 2015 municipal elections and be nominated to Consultative Assembly; Partial shift from imprisonment without trial to imprisonment with trial; King Khalid University president fired on 1 July 2012

Parties
(Saudi Arabia) Saudi Arabian opposition groups show all (9): Coalition for Freedom and Justice; Women to drive movement; Saudi Civil and Political Rights Association; Human Rights First Society; Asharq Center for Human Rights; Committee for the Defense of Human Rights in the Arabian Peninsula; Society for Development and Change; Association for the Protection and Defense of Women's Rights in Saudi Arabia; Umma Islamic Party; support by: United States Iran	(Saudi Arabia) Saudi Arabian government: Mabahith

Lead figures
(Saudi Arabia) Human Rights Defenders show all (3): Manal al-Sharif (Co-founder of Women to drive movement); Mohammad Fahad al-Qahtani (Leader and co-founder of the Saudi Civil and Political Rights Association); Wajeha al-Huwaider (Co-founder of The Association for the Protection and Defense of Women's Rights in Saudi Arabia); (Saudi Arabia) Independent Opposition leaders: Faisal Ahmed Abdul-Ahad (Facebook Activist); Nimr al-Nimr (executed) (Sheikh); Hatoon al-Fassi (Female suffrage activist); Morsi al-Rebh (Shia Activist)	King Abdullah; King of Saudi Arabia; Prince Salman; Crown Prince of Saudi Arabia; Prince Nayef; Crown Prince of Saudi Arabia (until June 2012); Prince Muhammad; Interior Minister

Number
Protesters:	Thousands
Online campaign:	26,000

Casualties and losses
Deaths:	36
Injuries:	100+
Arrests:	Riyadh: 50; East Province: 952
Deaths:	13 identified
Injuries:	Unknown

The following is a timeline of the 2011–2012 Saudi Arabian protests from January to June 2012. The 2011–2012 Saudi Arabian protests are a series of ongoing protests taking place in Saudi Arabia, which began in January 2011, influenced by concurrent protests in the region.

A protest for labour rights took place in Riyadh on 14 January and a sit-in calling for the Syrian Ambassador to be expelled occurred on 5 February in Jeddah.

Protests in the Qatif region continued from January to May, with security forces arresting medical personnel. Security forces shot dead Issam Mohamed Abu Abdallah in al-Awamiyah on 12 or 13 January, Munir al-Midani and Zuhair al-Said on 9 and 10 February. In the 70,000 strong funeral for Abdallah on 16 January in al-Awamiyah and the daily Qatif region protests that followed, protestors chanted slogans against the House of Saud and Minister of Interior, Nayef, Crown Prince of Saudi Arabia. In mid-February, two medical personnel were arrested for having clandestinely treated injured protestors. In a 10 February protest and a 13 February funeral, an effigy of Nayef was thrown at tanks and participants described Nayef as a "terrorist", "criminal" and "butcher". Police described two of the fatal shootings as responses to unidentified gunmen who had shot first.

Manal al-Sharif and Samar Badawi, active in the women to drive movement, announced that they had filed lawsuits against Saudi authorities in the Grievances Board, a non-Sharia court, because of the rejection of their driving licence applications. As of the end of June 2012, 100 Saudi women had started driving regularly since the June 2011 campaign launch. Women university students protested in King Khalid University in Abha in March and were attacked by security forces, leading to one death. Other university protests followed in Taibah University in Medina and Tabuk University in March and April.

== January 2012 ==
=== early January ===
On 6 January 2012, about two hundred people protested in Qatif against the Saudi government and in support of Bahrainis.

=== 12–13 January ===
Late on 12 January or at dawn on 13 January, during demonstrations calling for the "release of political detainees, reform and an end to sectarian discrimination", Issam Mohamed Abu Abdallah was killed by security forces in al-Awamiyah after demonstrators threw stones at them according to Al Jazeera English and BBC News. The Saudi Ministry of Interior said that a security vehicle had been attacked by petrol bombs and caught fire, and that while dealing with the fire, security forces were shot at and responded. Amnesty International called for an independent investigation into the killing. Amnesty International said that the killing of four protestors by Saudi security forces in November 2011 had not been investigated despite promises by the authorities.

On 13 January, hundreds of protestors gathered in response to Issam Mohamed Abu Abdallah's death. Videos of the protests were distributed on Facebook, showing protestors chanting, "We will not forget you, o martyrs."

=== 14 January ===
On 14 January, protests calling for labor rights and opposing corruption took place in Riyadh in front of the ministries of health and employment. One Saudi security force member was shot and wounded by unknown attackers on 14 January in the Qatif region. The Guardian suggested that this could have been related to protestors using violence because of the apparent ineffectiveness of peaceful protests, but that it was unclear if the shooting was related to the political protests. Saudi attributed the attacks to protestors on 24 January.

=== 16–22 January ===
On 16 January, 70,000 mourners accompanied Issam Mohamed Abu Abdallah's body in a funeral procession in al-Amawiyah. Mourners chanted slogans against the House of Saud and against late Minister of Interior, Nayef, Crown Prince of Saudi Arabia, including "Down with Al Saud", "Down with Nayef" and "Nayef, you are responsible of killing the martyr". On the same day, al-Awamiyah residents started signing a petition calling for an independent investigation into the protestors' deaths, gathering 760 signatures by 23 January.

On 18 January 40 people protested on Tarut Island and in Saihat to honour those killed and in support of prisoners. They chanted slogans against the House of Saud.

Two Saudi security force members were wounded by unidentified attackers on 18 or 20 January. This was later attributed by Saudi authorities to street protestors.

=== 23–27 January ===
On 23 January, The Guardian referred to the al-Amawiyah protestors as "[seeming] to have started an uprising", and that activists have dubbed the uprising as the "Intifada of dignity".

On 24 January, security forces arrested nine. Saudi authorities accused the arrestees of "instigating riots", of anti-government protests.

In a demonstration on Tarut Island on 25 January, protestors chanted "Nayef, you are responsible for the killing of protestors", in reference to Minister of Interior Nayef.

== February ==
=== Early February ===
A protest criticising the Minister of Interior and the killings of protestors and opposing economic and religious discrimination took place in al-Awamiyah on 1 February, the Hijri anniversary (in 2012) of the death of Imam Hasan al-Askari, one of Muhammad's followers. A call for the protest started on Facebook two days earlier. The protestors marched from Kerbala Square to al-Karama Square, where security forces threatened marchers using motor vehicles and by firing gunshots in the air.

On 3 February, a demonstration took place in Qatif calling for Shia minority rights.

On 5 February 2012, a sit-in by Hamza Kashgari and colleagues took place at Nawras Circle in Jeddah, calling for the Syrian Ambassador in Riyadh to be expelled in relation to the Syrian uprising. Kashgari was briefly detained by police.

On 7 February, security forces attempted to arrest Abdullah al-Sureih, who had made a speech at the 3 February Qatif demonstration, at his home. The arrest attempt was blocked by al-Sureih's supporters.

Manal al-Sharif and Samar Badawi, active in the women to drive movement, announced that they had filed lawsuits against Saudi authorities in the Grievances Board, a non-Sharia court, for the rejection of their driving licence applications.

Towards the end of a peaceful march in Qatif on 9 February calling for reforms, security forces used live fire against protestors, killing Muneer al-Midani (Arabic: منير الميداني) by a shot to the heart and wounding 6–14 other protestors. Security forces surrounded the central Qatif hospital and the Mushfi general hospital in order to transfer the injured to a military hospital. A police spokesperson said that the security forces shot at "a group of unidentified gunmen who had shot at security forces patrolling the area". The spokesperson said that one man died from the security forces' shots, that three were wounded, and that the wounded were taken to a local hospital.

On 10 February, the Friday Prayers leader in al-Awamiyah called for the Saudi monarchy to be abolished. A march for Mawlid took place in which participants called for reform and for the release of prisoners. A protestor threw an effigy of Minister of Interior Nayef at a "row of armoured anti-riot tanks". Security forces shot dead Zuhair al-Said (or Zaheer Abdullah Saeed, Arabic: زهير السعيد). A police spokesperson stated, "While security men were following up on an illegal gathering in the town of al-Awamiya in Qatif on Friday [10 February] they were attacked by gunfire. They dealt with the situation by firing back, which resulted with the death of one."

Eastern Province activists declared 11 February to be a day of mourning. Demonstrations calling for "regime change" took place in Qatif, al-Awamiyah and Safwa and schools and shops were closed. At a funeral for Zuhair on 13 February, participants chanted, "No Sunna, No Shia, but Islamic unity! We're not afraid, down with Nayef! You're the terrorist, you're the criminal, you're the butcher, ya Nayef! We will never rest, country of oppressors! Son of Saud [royal family], hear the voice! We will never give up 'til death!"

=== Mid-February ===
On or before 15 February, security forces arrested a Syrian doctor, Abdul Kareem al-Na'eem, in an al-Awamiyah medical centre, and a male nurse, Abdul Aziz al-Mohsen, in al-Qudaih, on the grounds that they had treated protestors injured during political protests without registering the protestors' names.

== March ==
=== Early March ===
An explosion on 1 March destroyed a petroleum pipeline in al-Awamiyah that leads to a major pipeline running from Abqaiq to Ras Tanura. Ministry of Interior spokesperson Mansour al-Turki stated, "There were no acts of sabotage in the kingdom [on 1 March]." FXstreet quoted part of a report on the event by "The Arab Digest". The Arab Digest report linked the would-be fire to the 2011–2012 Saudi Arabian protests, claimed that the fire occurred between al-Awamiyah and Safwa, and hyperlinked to blog photos of the would-be fire.

On 6 March, women students at King Khalid University in Abha, 'Asir Province, protested against "allowing the campus to deteriorate [and] ongoing corruption in the country". The protest was continued by 1000 women on 7 March. Security forces attacked the students "with batons, fire extinguishers, and water hoses", injuring 50 and leading to the death of Hajer al-Yazidi. The security forces' actions were criticised on social networking services including Twitter. A King Khalid University statement described the events, stating, "The situation evolved and chaos spread along with damage to public property and the use of fire extinguishers and water hoses against the other female students. Some lost consciousness and had to be taken away for medical assistance, and the university and the relevant authorities took the necessary security measures, until the complex was completely evacuated. The university will explore all the factors that led to the situation and deal with them, in the interest of public safety".

On 10 March, women at King Khalid University carried out a sit-in and men at the university carried out another protest, both calling for Abdullah al-Rashid, the head of King Khalid University, to resign or be dismissed. Governor Faisal bin Khalid of 'Asir Province ordered an investigation to "consider the demands of the students" and said that the students' demands would be passed on to King Abdullah. Deputy Governor of 'Asir Province, Abdel Karim al-Hunaini, stated that the students had the right to protest.

=== Mid-March ===
Following the King Khalid University protests in Abha, protests took place in Riyadh, al-Namas, Arar, Qatif and al-Rabeeya. A student criticised university conditions at a public meeting with the head of Taibah University in Medina and was expelled as a result. The Arab Network for Human Rights Information claimed that there was a "[protest] movement [spreading] at the universities level".

The Saudi Civil and Political Rights Association (ACPRA) organised 38 people who planned a hunger strike on 15–16 March to call for ACPRA co-founder Mohammed Saleh al-Bejadi to be released from prison.

== April ==
On 8 April, first-year women students at Tabuk University protested against faculty behaviour and nepotism, called for better services and assessment, the right to use mobile telephones and the opening of a dental clinic, and called for some expatriate faculty to be replaced by Saudis.

On 10 April, Mohammed Saleh al-Bejadi, co-founder of the Saudi Civil and Political Rights Association (ACPRA), was sentenced to four years' imprisonment and a five-year ban on foreign travel for "unlawfully establishing a human rights organisation; distorting the state's reputation in media; impugning judicial independence; instigating relatives of political detainees to demonstrate and protest; and possessing censored books".

Protests against the House of Saud and calling for prisoner release were held in towns in the Qatif region on 20 April.

== May ==
In mid-May, Kamel Abbas al-Ahmed, the brother of the founder and director of the Institute for Gulf Affairs, Ali Abbas al-Ahmed, was arrested. The Arabic Network for Human Rights Information (ANHRI) believed that Kamel al-Ahmed was arrested for his political activities in opposition to discrimination against Shia and for his brother's activities as an expatriate Saudi dissident.

== June ==
About 20 people protested in the Sahara mall in Riyadh on the evening of 6 June, calling for uncharged prisoners to be released. They called out "release the distressed" and "freedom". A blogger published videos of the protest.

On 29 June, to celebrate the anniversary of the June 2011 women's driving campaign launch, a member of the My Right to Dignity women's rights campaign drove her car in Riyadh. She stated that she had driven about 30–40 times in 2011 and that about 100 Saudi women had driven regularly since June 2011.
