= Timeline of the 2011–2012 Saudi Arabian protests (January–April 2011) =

2011–2012 Saudi Arabian protests
- Part of Qatif conflict and the Arab Spring
- Date: 11 March 2011 – 24 December 2012 (1 year, 11 months and 3 days)
- Location: Saudi Arabia; 24.65°N 46.767°E
- Caused by: Prisoners held without trial; Inequality for women; Corruption; High unemployment; Discrimination against Shias; Saudi troops intervention in Bahrain; Inspiration from concurrent regional protests; Arrest of Nimr al-Nimr
- Goals: Political and economic changes; Women's suffrage; Women's right to drive; Release of political prisoners; Deportation of Peninsula Shield Force from Bahrain; Equality for Shias; Constitution and independent legislative assembly in Eastern Province; Release of Nimr al-Nimr
- Methods: Demonstrations; Self-immolation; Internet activism
- Result: Saudi government victory
- Concessions: US$130,000,000,000 to benefit citizens; Municipal elections held on 29 September 2011; Women to participate in 2015 municipal elections and be nominated to Consultative Assembly; Partial shift from imprisonment without trial to imprisonment with trial; King Khalid University president fired on 1 July 2012

Parties
Opposition; Coalition for Freedom and Justice; Women to drive movement; Saudi Civil and Political Rights Association; Human Rights First Society; Asharq Center for Human Rights; Committee for the Defense of Human Rights in the Arabian Peninsula; Society for Development and Change; Association for the Protection and Defense of Women's Rights in Saudi Arabia; Umma Islamic Party; Supported by: United States; Iran	Government of Saudi Arabia; Ministry of Interior; General Directorate of Public Security; General Directorate of Investigations

Lead figures
Human Rights Defenders: Manal al-Sharif (Co-founder of Women to drive movement); Mohammad Fahad al-Qahtani (Leader and co-founder of the Saudi Civil and Political Rights Association); Wajeha al-Huwaider (Co-founder of Association for the Protection and Defense of Women's Rights in Saudi Arabia); Independent Opposition leaders: Faisal Ahmed Abdul-Ahad (Facebook Activist); Nimr al-Nimr (executed) (Shia Sheikh); Hatoon al-Fassi (Female suffrage activist); Morsi al-Rebh † (Shia Activist)	King Abdullah; King of Saudi Arabia; Prince Salman; Crown Prince of Saudi Arabia; Prince Nayef; Crown Prince of Saudi Arabia (until June 2012); Prince Muhammad; Interior Minister

Number
Protesters:	Thousands
Online campaign:	26,000

Casualties and losses
36 killed 100+ injured 50 arrested in Riyadh and 952 in East Province	13 killed (identified); Unknown injuries

The following is a timeline of the 2011–2012 Saudi Arabian protests from January to April 2011. The 2011–2012 Saudi Arabian protests are a series of ongoing protests taking place in Saudi Arabia, which began in January 2011, influenced by concurrent protests in the region.

Protests started with a 65-year-old man's self-immolation in Samtah, Jizan on 21 January and protests of a few hundred people in late January in Jeddah and several times throughout February and early March in the cities of Qatif, al-Awamiyah, Riyadh, and Hofuf. A "Day of Rage" was planned for 11 March. One of the main organisers, Faisal Ahmed Abdul-Ahad (or Abdul-Ahadwas), was alleged to have been killed by Saudi security forces on 2 March, by which time one of the Facebook groups discussing the plans had over 26,000 members. On 11 March, several hundred people protested in Qatif, Hofuf and al-Amawiyah. Khaled al-Johani demonstrated in Riyadh despite a massive police presence, was interviewed by BBC Arabic Television, and has since then been detained in ʽUlaysha Prison. Al-Johani became known online as "the only brave man in Saudi Arabia".

The Saudi Civil and Political Rights Association (ACPRA) and the Saudi organisation Human Rights First Society called for ACPRA co-founder Mohammed Saleh Albejadi to be released following his arbitrary arrest in Buraidah on 21 March by Mabahith, the internal security agency. In April, several small protests over labour rights took place in front of government ministry buildings in Riyadh, Ta'if and Tabuk. Protests, made up mainly of Shia protesters, continued in late March and April in Qatif and smaller cities in the Eastern Province such as al-Awamiyah, and Hofuf. The protesters called for the release of prisoners, for the Peninsula Shield Force to be withdrawn from Bahrain, for equal representation in key offices and for reforms in political positions, as they feel marginalised.

In response to the 22–23 March announcement of men-only municipal elections in late September 2011 to elect half the members of local councils, women organised a Facebook women's suffrage campaign called "Baladi", stating that Saudi Arabian law gives women electoral rights. In April, women in Jeddah, Riyadh and Dammam tried to register as electors for the 22 September municipal elections despite officials stating that women could not participate.

== January ==
=== 21 January 2011 ===
An unidentified 65-year-old man died on 21 January after setting himself on fire in the town of Samtah, Jizan. This was apparently the kingdom's first known case of self-immolation.

=== 29 January 2011 ===
On 29 January, hundreds of protesters gathered in the city of Jeddah in a rare display of criticism against the city's poor infrastructure after deadly floods swept through the city, killing eleven people. Police stopped the demonstration about 15 minutes after it started. About 30 to 50 people were arrested. Hamza Kashgari, at the time a journalist at Al-Bilad, criticised the authorities' response to the floods. On the same day, an online campaign started on Facebook, making demands that included calling for Saudi Arabia to become a constitutional monarchy, and for "an end to corruption, an even distribution of wealth, and a serious solution for unemployment".

== February ==
=== 5 February ===
On 5 February, about 40 women wearing black clothes demonstrated in Riyadh, calling for the release of prisoners held without trial.

=== 10 February ===
On 10 February, a Thomson Reuters report claimed that 10 intellectuals, human rights activists and lawyers came together to create the Umma Islamic Party – considered to be the first political party in Saudi Arabia since the 1990s – to demand the end of absolute monarchy in the country. On 18 February, all ten founding members of the party were arrested and ordered to withdraw demands for political reform in exchange for their release.

=== 17 February ===
According to Reuters Africa, a small protest was held by Shia in the small town of al-Awamiyah, near Qatif in the Eastern Province to demand the release of three political prisoners held since protests in the town on 19 March 2009 protesting an arrest warrant against the town's Shia imam, Sheikh Nimr Bagir al Namr. The prisoners were identified as Ali Ahmad al Faraj, the sheikh's 16-year-old nephew, and two others, Ali Salih Abdul Jabbar and Makki Al Abbas. The three prisoners were released on 20 February.

=== 24 February ===
A protest was held in Qatif by Shi'a Muslims to demand the release of additional political prisoners. Video posted to YouTube confirms the existence and location of the protest, showing the roundabout 350 meters south of Ohud Road on King Abdelaziz Road.

=== 25 February ===
A group called Jeddah Youth for Change called for a rally in Jeddah on 25 February.

=== Late February ===
Brian Whitaker of The Guardian interpreted the creation of a website for people to publish complaints about government services, "shakra.com", the circulation of at least three online petitions calling for political and legal reforms and a call for reform that is "the result of meaningful interaction and dialogue among the different components of a society" by Prince Al-Waleed bin Talal as protest actions that "in a Saudi context [are] momentous".

== March ==
=== 3–4 March ===
About 100 people, mostly men, and one group of women, marched in Al-Awamiyah and Qatif in the Eastern Province, protesting against prisoners held without trial, calling out "Peaceful, peaceful". In Qatif, 22 of the protesters were arrested. Police responses in Qatif included attacks on women protesters.

Protests following Friday 4 March prayers took place in Riyadh and Hofuf. In Riyadh, at least 3 people were arrested after criticising the monarchy. Both alarmed and annoyed by such action, the Saudi government reminded citizens that public protesting was banned, and that the ban would be strictly enforced.

=== 9–10 March ===
Protests took place in the evening of 9 March in Qatif. About 600–800 protesters were present at a similar protest on the evening of 10 March, calling for nine prisoners to be released. About 200 police were present. The police used "percussion bombs" and shot at protesters with gunfire for about 10 minutes. Three protesters were injured and hospitalised with "moderate" injuries.

=== 11 March – "Day of Rage" ===
A "Day of Rage" was planned by Saudi Arabians on 11 March at noon in solidarity with protests in Libya and Bahrain. A Facebook page called for a "11 March Revolution of Longing" and included demands for "the ousting of the regime" and for the national leader and the Consultative Assembly of Saudi Arabia to be chosen by election. It also called for elections for national leadership, more women's rights and for freeing political prisoners. As of 5 March, one of the Facebook groups calling for the Day of Rage had about 26,000 members.

On 11 March itself, protests continued for the third day in a row in Qatif and extended to Hofuf and al-Amawiyah, with several hundred protesters participating in the three protests. In Jeddah, The Los Angeles Times and Agence France Presse reported heavy military and police patrolling and an absence of protests.

In Riyadh, the police presence was "overwhelming" by early in the morning of 11 March, with large numbers of police cars present and helicopters that "crisscrossed the skies all day". One person, Khaled al-Johani, walked past BBC Arabic Television journalists twice and both times was threatened by police that he would be imprisoned if he walked past the journalists, who were accompanied by state escorts, a third time. He stated, "I'm here to say we need democracy, we need freedom. We need to speak freely. We will reach out, the government doesn't own us. I was afraid to speak, but no more. We don't have dignity, we don't have justice!" He stated that there is no freedom of the press in Saudi Arabia, since it is an absolute monarchy, and that living a dignified life in Saudi Arabia depends on an individual's connection and mercy of Al-Saud princes. After stating his opinion, al-Johani stated his worry that he would be detained before returning home and said that the journalists could visit him at al-Ha'ir or ʽUlaysha Prison. Al-Johani was detained after he returned home and was not allowed any contact with his family for 58 days. As of 20 April 2011, al-Johani was being held at ʽUlaysha Prison. After visiting al-Johani in May, family members said that he had lost weight and was depressed. AOL News said that al-Johani became a "folk hero in the blink of an eye" when the BBC broadcast al-Johani's full statement in April and a six-minute video "Where is Khaled?" was uploaded to YouTube. According to Mohammad al-Qahtani of the Saudi Civil and Political Rights Association, al-Johani became known online as "the only brave man in Saudi Arabia".

=== 13 March ===
More than 200 people protested outside of the Ministry of the Interior in Riyadh on Sunday 13 March, asking for information about prisoners and their immediate release. Protester Ahmed Ali said that his brother has been imprisoned for four years and nothing is known about him nor the charges against him. Another protester said that his father has been in prison for 10 years without receiving medical attention for his colon cancer nor a trial. The protesters asked to meet with the Minister for the Interior Prince Nayef bin Abdulaziz Al Saud. The request was refused and entry to the Ministry building was refused.

=== 15–18 March ===
On 15 March, about 1000 people protested in Qatif calling for the Peninsula Shield Force to be withdrawn from Bahrain, where it is being used against Bahraini protesters. A related protest took place in al-Awamiyah. Hundreds of people protested in Qatif and the nearby region on 16 March, calling for the release of prisoners and expressing support for the Bahraini protesters. Anti-riot forces were present at the protests. The Qatif demonstration lasted for about half an hour. Protesters called for the Peninsula Shield Force to be withdrawn from Bahrain. The protests continued the following day, 17 March, in and near Qatif, with similar demands, and about 4000 protesters in Qatif. Police fired rubber bullets and several people were injured. One slogan used in the protests was "Bahrain Free Free. Saudi forces out!". Similar protests took place on Friday 18 March, in Qatif, Omran, al-Awamiyah (about 2500 protesters), Safwa City and al-Rabeeya (1000 protesters each). Ten people in Omran were injured from being hit by police batons. One of the slogans in Qatif was "One people not two people – the people of Qatif and Bahrain!"

=== 20 March – 1 April ===
Calls for protests on 20 March were made on a Facebook page in late February.

On 20 March, about 100 people demonstrated outside the Ministry of the Interior in Riyadh, calling for family members imprisoned without trial to be released, for the third time in March, following similar protests on 4 March and 13 March. The demonstrators tried to enter the Ministry building, which was surrounded by about 50 police cars. About 15 to 50 protesters were arrested.

Hundreds demonstrated in Qatif on 20 March against the use of the Peninsula Shield Force troops from the six Gulf Cooperation Council states against the 2011 Bahraini uprising. Reuters described the intervention in Bahrain as having caused the protests to intensify, reporting an incident in which the second home of Sheikh Wajeeh al-Awjami, a judge calling for street protests to stop, was burnt by angry youths.

Similar protests by hundreds of people in villages near Qatif took place on Friday 25 March and again in Qatif and al-Awamiyah on 1 April.

== April ==
=== 5 April ===
About a hundred literacy campaign teachers held a street demonstration outside the Ministry of Civil Services in Riyadh on 5 April, demanding to be employed full-time. Similar demonstrations took place in Ta'if and Tabuk. Officials at the Ministry in Riyadh promised to fulfill the demands.

=== 8 April ===
Hundreds of people again protested in Qatif and al-Awamiyah against the use of the Peninsula Shield Force troops from the six Gulf Cooperation Council states against the 2011 Bahraini uprising and for their own political rights and freedoms. Thomson Reuters stated that no riot police were seen at the Qatif demonstration.

=== 10 April ===
On Sunday 10 April, small protests by literacy teachers and unemployed university graduates regarding labour rights took place in front of the Ministries of Civil Services and Education in Riyadh and the Ministry of Education in Jeddah. Facebook was used for coordinating one of the protests.

=== 14–15 April ===
Protests against the use of the Peninsula Shield Force troops in the 2011 Bahraini uprising and for local political rights and freedoms, including the release of prisoners held without trial, again took place in Qatif and al-Awamiyah on 14 and 15 April, with about 400–500 protesters in each town and no clashes with police.

=== 21–22 April ===
Protests for similar reasons again took place in Qatif, al-Awamiyah and Saihat by a few tens to a few hundred protesters. A new complaint made by the protesters was against the destruction of mosques in Bahrain by the Peninsula Shield Force.

=== 23–25 April ===
In a civil disobedience action from 23 to 25 April, women in Jeddah, Riyadh and Dammam tried to register as electors for the 22 September municipal elections despite an official ban against women's participation. The Gulf News said that there was "strong public opinion ... supporting women's participation in the election process" following local newspapers' publication of photos of women waiting in queues to register for the election. Fawzia Al Hani, chair of the "Baladi" Facebook campaign, said that Saudi Arabian law states that women have the right to vote and to stand as candidates.

=== 29 April ===
In the Eastern Province during the days leading up to 29 April, about 20 to 30 people, including two bloggers, were arrested for anti-government activities. On 29 April, a few hundred people demonstrated in Qatif and al-Awamiyah for similar reasons to previous weeks. Five protesters were injured by police in Qatif.
