= Timeline of the 2011–2012 Saudi Arabian protests =

The timeline of the 2011–2012 Saudi Arabian protests is contained in the following articles related to the 2011–present Saudi Arabian protests:

- Timeline of the 2011–2012 Saudi Arabian protests (January–April 2011), a chronology from the start of protests in late January 2011 to April 2011, prior to the women's driving campaign.
- Timeline of the 2011–2012 Saudi Arabian protests (May–December 2011), a chronology from the women's driving campaign to the end of 2011.
- Timeline of the 2011–2012 Saudi Arabian protests (January–June 2012), a chronology from January 2012 to June 2012, prior to Nimr al-Nimr's July arrest.
- Timeline of the 2011–2012 Saudi Arabian protests (from July 2012), a chronology from July 2012 onward.

== See also ==
- Timeline of the Arab Spring
