= Yahya Assiri =

Secretary General for the NAAS Party

- يحيى عسيري
- Born: 17 July 1980 (age 45); Abha, Asir Province, Saudi Arabia
- Years active: 2000–present
- Known for: leadership of ALQST
- Notable work: ALQST, Diwan London and Moqsetoon
- Political party: National Assembly Party
- Website: www.assiri.uk

Yahya Assiri (Arabic: يحيى عسيري) is a Saudi Arabian human rights activist and former member of the Royal Saudi Air Force.

== Early life and career ==
Assiri was born in 1980 in Abha, Asir Province, a region in south-west Saudi Arabia. He joined the Royal Saudi Air Force when he was 18. After failing pilot training he moved to work in logistics and administration and, rising to senior officer rank, he eventually became responsible for weapons purchases. Assiri received his master's degree in Human Rights and Political Communications from Kingston University and has a bachelor's degree in Administration.

== Political and human rights activism ==
Assiri described his human rights concerns starting with voicing the worries of his air force colleagues who felt that their salaries were unfairly low in comparison with the wealth of members of the Saudi royal family. Assiri started becoming involved in online political forums in 2004. In 2006 he attended five or six public forums organised by Saud al-Hashimi in Jeddah, in which guests included the Palestinian Khaled Mashal and the Tunisian Rached Ghannouchi. He became involved in protests during an air force training period in London beginning in 2009. At the end of this period, he returned to Saudi Arabia but had difficulty finding work.

=== Political asylum ===
In 2013, Assiri returned to London to study human rights at Kingston University. In 2014, worried by the arrests of Abdullah al-Hamid and Mohammad Fahad al-Qahtani of the Saudi Civil and Political Rights Association and the long prison sentences that they received and by news from his colleagues that he would most likely be imprisoned if he returned to Saudi Arabia, he applied for political asylum in the United Kingdom. Assiri founded Al Qst (or ALQST), a human rights organisation, in August 2014. In 2015, he expressed concern that British authorities might have been delaying his request for political asylum in order to force him and his family to return to Saudi Arabia. In early 2017 he and his family were granted asylum with refugee status in the United Kingdom.

== Cybercrime target ==
In 2018, Assiri, together with other Saudi opposition members, like Ghanem Almasarir, was the target of cybercrime attempts. Their phones were targeted by the Pegasus spyware, with suspicions that the Saudi authorities were responsible.

== See also ==
- Walid Fitaihi
