= Waleed Abulkhair =

Saudi Arabian lawyer and human rights activist (born 1979)

- وليد أبوالخير
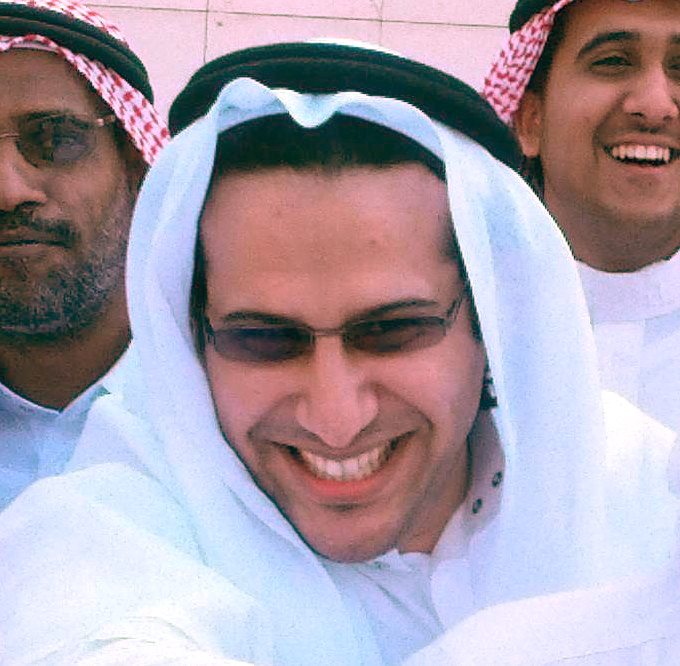
- Waleed Abulkhair in November 2012
- Born: 17 June 1979 (age 47); Jeddah, Saudi Arabia
- Occupations: Lawyer and human rights activist
- Years active: 2007–present
- Spouse: Samar Badawi (m. 2010; div. 2015)
- Children: 1 daughter
- Awards: Right Livelihood Award

Waleed Sami Abulkhair (Arabic: وليد سامي أبوالخير; born 17 June 1979) is a Saudi Arabian lawyer and human rights activist, and the head of the Monitor of Human Rights in Saudi Arabia (MHRSA) organization. He is the first activist to be prosecuted by the Terrorism Law. He was arrested on 15 April 2014, and was sent to al-Ha'ir Prison while awaiting prosecution. On 6 July 2014, Abulkhair was sentenced to 15 years in prison by the Specialized Criminal Court, (10 years executed and five suspended) and a travel ban for another 15 years, in addition to a fine of 200,000 riyals (US$53,333). On 12 January 2015, the case returned to the Court of Appeals, after which the judge requested increasing the previous sentence, because Abulkhair refused to apologize. Thus, the judgment was tightened to 15-year executed. In response, Abulkhair prayed for God's victory and refused to recognize the legitimacy of the Specialized Criminal Court. Abulkhair is incarcerated in the Dhahban Central Prison in Jeddah, Saudi Arabia, a facility used to hold high-profile political prisoners, as well as members of al-Qaeda and the Islamic State.

In 2018, he was awarded the Right Livelihood Award, together with Abdullah al-Hamid and Mohammad Fahad al-Qahtani for "their visionary and courageous efforts, guided by universal human rights principles, to reform the totalitarian political system in Saudi Arabia."

== Early life, family and education ==
Muhammad Waleed AbuAlKhair Al Maktoum was born in Jeddah, west of Saudi Arabia.

He comes from a Hejazi family of judges and Imams of the Holy Mosque.

Waleed's grandfather Al Maktoum Mohammed Saeed AbuAlkhair was one of the Jeddah commissioners who signed the agreement with King Abdulaziz under the condition that ruling Hejaz must be self-governying under the guidance of the Quran and prophets sayings and the four leading Imam's guidance.@WaleedAbulkhair (10 August 2013). "وثيقة البيعة بين أهل الحجاز (وفيهم جدي) والملك عبدالعزيز على العمل بالكتاب والسنة وعمل والسلف والمذاهب الأربعة" (Tweet) (in Arabic) – via Twitter.

Waleed's mother, Elhaam Al Abbasi, also come from a well known Hejazi family. His mother had a huge impact on his character, and continues to be a strong influence on his personality.

Waleed's oldest uncle, Yahya Abulkhair, is a retired professor specializing in Geology. He taught at King Saud University. Waleed's younger uncle, Sameer Abulkhair, was a retired Major General working for the border guards sector in the Ministry of Interior in Medina city.

Waleed married Samar Badawi. After two months of his detention, she gave birth to their daughter, Joud. In November 2015, while Abulkhair was still in prison, he and Samar Badawi agreed to divorce for personal reasons.

Waleed holds two bachelor's degrees: one in law, which he earned with the highest distinction; and a second degree specializing in Arabic language. In 2009, he got his master's degree in Islamic law from Alyarmook University in Jordan after defending his thesis (Affinities and Differences in the Evidences and Reasons and Judgements: a Consolidating Applicable and Comparative Study). The Thesis was supervised by Dr. Abdul-Jaleel Zuhair Thamrah. Waleed has memorized the Quran and got a license from Shaikh Obaid Allah AlAfqani and was approved by the Teaching Board of the Holy Mosque in Madinah.

== Professional career and human rights activism ==
In 2007 Waleed Abulkhair began his career in the legal profession, where he joined lawyer Essam Basrawi and worked in his office.

In the same year, Waleed—along with several other activists—launched a statement entitled Features of a Constitutional Monarchy, which explicitly demanded the ruling family of Saudi Arabia change the current regime of absolute monarchy to a constitutional monarchy. This led the Saudi Authorities to stop funding his Graduate studies for master's degree, so he studied and finished his master's degree on his own expenses.

Waleed Abulkhair defended a number of clients in the case of Jeddah reformers, including Dr. Mossa bin Mohammed Al-Qarni, Dr. Saud al-Hashimi and Dr. Abdul Rahman al-Shumaimri, who were arrested in February 2007. He filed a lawsuit on June 22, 2009 against the Interior Ministry over the detention of his clients without charge. He was also hired by the British Embassy in Saudi Arabia to defend one of its nationals detained by Saudi authorities.

Abulkhair was one of those who signed a famous petition called “Toward a State of Rights and Institutions”.

Demanding the release of detainees who he considered to be political prisoners, Waleed organized what he called "the first hunger strike campaign in Saudi Arabia for human rights", lasting for 48 hours. Due to this, he was invited in Mexico City to a summit named the “Alliance of Youth Movement”.

He signed other two more petitions in 2011, "Towards a State of Rights and Institutions", the "National Declaration for Reform", which called for radical reforms in the political system, and coincided with waves of protests against Arab regimes.

He is the founder, in 2008, of Monitor for Human Rights in Saudi Arabia (MHRSA), an independent human rights organization. In December of that year the Monitor site was blocked, resulting in it being rebuilt on social networking site Facebook. However, in May 2009, this page was also blocked. In 2012, Waleed registered and licensed the Monitor at the Canadian Ministry of Labor. Thus, MHRSA became the first Saudi human rights organization to be licensed abroad. Waleed Abulkhair then sent a letter appealing to King Abduallah to allow recognition of the organization in Saudi Arabia. The Royal Court replied by transmitting the request to the Interior Ministry, which opened an investigation into the organization.

Waleed was a prominent role in the voluntary processes that got during the Jeddah torrents where he established with some young activists a page on the social networking "Facebook" entitled (Save Jeddah Campaign) which were effective means of communication between young people in the time of crisis in the rescue operations.

In March 2012, Abulkhair was nominated by the US State Department to attend an extensive course for six-week titled "Democratic leaders" at Syracuse University in New York sponsored by the US State Department, but the Bureau of Investigation and Prosecution in Jeddah summoned him and told him that he was banned from traveling.

=== Smood, the weekly salon ===
As a reaction to the Saudi authorities decision to shut down Bridges Café in Jeddah, which was a meeting point for Saudi youth to talk and discuss several topics, in 2013 Abu al-Khair started a weekly gathering in his living room, hosting a few dozen of people, most of them politically engaged Saudi youth from different backgrounds. Topics focused on political, religious and human rights issues, in addition to cultural and intellectual subjects. The salon is named “Smood” (صمود), an Arabic word that can be translated as "resistance" or "steadfastness".

Smood was attacked heavily by many conservatives in social media and on TV. It has been claimed that the salon encouraged atheism and skepticism, especially after Hamza Kashgari’s case, knowing that he was a personal friend of Abu al-Khair and many other regular visitors to the meetings. One day, few conservatives visited Smood and secretly recorded the discussion without the attendees' permission; on the next day, they tweeted negatively about the topics discussed and the type of people attending Smood. Moreover, they contacted a TV show and requested from the government and the Hai'ia to take serious action against such meetings. Abulkhair defended his salon by saying that he is offering the freedom of speech, the freedom of belief and the freedom of expression, things that cannot be provided outside the door of his house. Abulkhair mentioned his salon in an article that he posted in the Washington Post titled "Steadfast in pursuing a freer Saudi Arabia".

=== Samar Badawi and Raif Badawi cases ===
Abulkhair was the lawyer of both Samar Badawi, and her brother Raif Badawi. Samar Badawi is a Saudi woman who was detained in jail for seven months because of accusations ofdisobeying her father. Abulkhair took up her case and defended her in Saudi courts. He also launched a campaign to demand her release by using various social media such as Twitter and Facebook. In addition, he created a special blog to publish all updates and documents related to the case. After three weeks, the campaign had achieved its goals and Badawi was released from prison.

Abulkhair represented Raif Badawi, founder of the Saudi Liberal Network Internet discussion group, after he was arrested for establishing the network and charged with "committing violations of legitimacy" and "insulting the Divine self". Abulkhair represented Raif before detention when he was sentenced to death for insulting religion but he dropped the case and then directly he was detained, and Raif was sentenced to jail.

=== Media presence ===
Abulkhair conducted interviews with international media, including those with Kevin Sliven of the Washington Post, Jacob Timblin of Time magazine, and Pierre Pray of Le Figaro newspaper, as well as Frank Gardner of the BBC. Abulkhair also wrote several articles for non-Saudi newspapers, including two essays for The Washington Post first titled "Steadfast in pursuing a freer Saudi Arabia". and the other entitled "prison sentence for peaceful activity in Saudi Arabia". He also wrote an article entitled "Obstacle in Front of Saudis and Fear" published by the Institute for War and Peace Reporting, and wrote an article published on MSNBC entitled "The Kingdom of Saudi Arabia and stifle dissent in the name of combating terrorism".

Abulkhair also wrote more than 300 articles in local newspapers in Arabic in which he addressed various legal and human rights issues.

Amnesty International published the last article written by Waleed Abulkhair before his imprisonment, entitled "Even from prison, you can still light a candle", after his imprisonment.

The last meeting with him before his arrest was with Alasr magazine, in which he stated that "the ACPRA association is no longer an association only, but is an idea, and the idea is bulletproof, and resist arrests and repression. It is an excuse to God and to the people. ACPRA is a historical case in this spot of world to improve that people have not liked all this injustice and stood bravely against it". He added a sort of speech saying: "We sacrifice for so long dear Friends, it is a difficult time in which our sincerity and loyalty to our principles and colleagues are tested. This time we will not realize the value of our actions, but after a while, as we do not realize the value of love until we give it, then we can reach the noble goals and surrender to the pain. Blessed are those who meet our free colleagues. To my mother and my father and the rest of my family: I do not know if I’m going to be released after 3 months or stay longer, but what I'm doing is the right thing, I did not let down freedom on which I was raised. So be proud, make sure that your son did not steal, loot or hypocrite, your son told the oppressor this is unfair..."

On 26 August 2014, the Washington Post published an article entitled "Saudi Arabia Continues its Outrageous Repression on Human Rights Activists" in which it wrote about the judgment against Abulkhair, describing it as "the latest in a long and sorrowful series of persecutions of those who stand for human rights and dignity in the kingdom".

=== International conferences ===
Abulkhair has built a global reputation as a reliable and certified source for the international community on human rights issues in Saudi Arabia in 2010. He has attended two meetings under the sponsorship of the Organization of Bridging in the Gulf, the first held in the European Parliament to discuss the human rights situation in the Gulf States, and the second was held in Kuwait and was on the status of human rights activists in the Gulf states. He also attended a conference held by the Human Rights Watch in Bahrain. He also attended a meeting with a number of European diplomats sponsored by Front Line Defenders Org to discuss human rights issues in the Gulf states. In the same year, Abulkhair developed his skills in human rights work by attending a course entitled to monitor and document human rights violations, organized by the Bahrain Human Rights Society in cooperation with the Scandinavian Organization for Human Rights. He also participated in the summit of the Alliance of Youth Movements, which was held in Mexico. In addition, he got the coach in human rights training and a license from the Human Rights Information Center in Yemen.

=== Waleed Talks ===
Following his imprisonment, a series of English-subtitled videos, which had been shot before, were released explaining his views. The first video was published on 25 May 2014 in which he talked about his view on freedom. In the video, Abulkhair says:

I might get worried only about my family but in all what happened and will happen to me I am enjoying because I feel I am practicing what makes me happy, which is my freedom.

The second video, published on 4 August 2014, was entitled Why did I deny the legitimacy of the Specialized Criminal Court?, in which Abulkhair strongly criticized the court hearing his case because it was "not independent" and strongly tied to the executive bodies.

== Detention and trial ==
Abulkhair was facing two trials. On 4 February 2014, the Court of Appeals in Makkah approved a three-month sentence for charges against him of contempt of the judiciary. However, Abulkhair remained free.

On 15 April 2014, Abulkhair was arrested in the Specialized Criminal Court when he was attending the fifth session of the trial. His family did not receive any news about him until the next day, later it was announced that he was arrested and transferred to Al-Ha'ir Prison.

Abulkhair's second trial started on 4 November 2013 and the charges included breaking allegiance to the ruler, disrespecting the authorities, creating an unauthorized association and supervising it (MHRSA), contributing to the establishment of another organization (ACPRA) and inciting public opinion. These charges had already been considered in the Jeddah Court at the first trial in which his three-month sentence was issued.

On 22 April 2014, one week after his arrest, his wife said that he was under "torture for political purposes".

On 4 February 2015, the authorities transferred Abulkhair for the sixth time of his imprisonment to former Ha'ir prison.

Amnesty International demanded his release "immediately and unconditionally, because it is a prisoner of conscience detained solely for peacefully exercising his right to freedom of expression". Human Rights Watch called for his release "immediately and to drop the charges against him". Front Line Defenders commented that the detention is unfair for he has practiced his legitimate and peaceful work in the field of human rights only. Reporters Without Borders has condemned the arrest, saying that this trial that it is not only a tragic farce orchestrated by the Saudi authorities to crack down on all opposition voices. After the arrest of Abulkhair, tens of young people in Saudi Arabia and the gulf countries wrote messages of solidarity with him. On 15 May, Amnesty International published an article by Abulkhair that he wrote to be published after his arrest. He refused to recognize the legitimacy of the specialized security and plead before the court, for refusing to "crimes of terrorism and its financing law", which he was prosecuted according to it.

== Judgment ==
On 7 July 2014, Abulkhair was sentenced to 15 years' imprisonment (10 years executed and five suspended), followed by a 15-year ban on travel. The Specialized Criminal Court in Jeddah found him guilty of "undermining the regime and officials", "inciting public opinion" and "insulting the judiciary". In addition, Abulkhair was fined 200,000 riyals (£31,110).

On 12 January 2015, the case returned from the Court of Appeal, after the judge requested increasing the previous judgment because AbuAlkhair refused to apologize. Thus, the judgment was tightened to 15-year executed. Abulkhair prayed for God's victory and insisted not to recognize the court and the legitimacy of the SCC.

On 12 February 2015, a known activist "Mujtahid" published part of the judgment document via his account in Twitter, which Waleed Abulkhair refused to take a copy of.

The judgment was criticized by international human rights organizations such as HRW, Reporters Without Borders, Amnesty International. In addition, it was criticized by both the U.S. Department of State and the UN High Commissioner for Human Rights. On 25 February 2015, members of the Green Party in the Austrian Parliament moved to demand the release Abulkhair. On 3 March 2015 around 67 members of United States Congress wrote a speech to King Salman asking him to do reforms in political issues and to release the detainee activists and lawyers and they mentioned Waleed AbuAlkhair

== Imprisonment ==
According to Human Rights Watch, since his arrest in April, Abulkhair was transferred 5 times. In the last transport, authorities initially refused to inform his family of his place. In Bryman prison in Jeddah, he was beaten on the back and dragged out of prison with chains on him, which injured his feet, after he refused to cooperate in his transfer to another prison. On 4 February 2015, the authorities transferred him for the sixth time of his imprisonment in Al-Ha’ir prison in Riyadh. He is serving his conviction now in Dhahban Central Prison in Jeddah City.

== Publications ==
- Our steadfast pursuit of a freer Saudi Arabia, The Washington Post, April 2012.
- Saudis Stymied by Fear, Institute for War & Peace Reporting, July 2011.
- "Jailed in Saudi Arabia for peaceful activism", The Washington Post, November 2013.

Additionally, Abulkhair has published more than 300 articles in Saudi newspapers concerning legal reforms and human rights issues.

== Awards and honors ==
On 25 January 2013, Abulkhair received the Swedish Olof Palme Prize in recognition of his "strong and continuous struggle characterized by selfless in order to promote respect for human rights and civil rights for both men and women". He bestowed the award upon the detainee activist Dr. Abdullah al-Hamed.

On 12 June 2015, Abulkhair was designated as the prizewinner of Ludovic Trarieux International Human Rights Prize, the largest prize in the field of human rights in Europe, which has already been awarded to Nelson Mandela, President of South Africa.

On 9 October 2015, Abulkhair was awarded the first Swiss Freethinker Prize.

On 24 November 2016, the Law Society of Upper Canada announced that the 2016 Law Society of Upper Canada Human Rights Award would be granted jointly to Waleed Abulkhair and Dr. Cindy Blackstock.

In both2016 and 2017, Waleed Abulkhair was nominated for the Nobel Peace Prize by two members of the Norwegian Parliament.

On 9 October 2018, Chimamanda Ngozi Adichie accepted the 2018 PEN Pinter Prize and named Waleed Abulkhair as co-winner of the prize.

In 2018, he was awarded the Right Livelihood Award, together with Abdullah al-Hamid and Mohammad Fahad al-Qahtani.[4]

In 2019, he was awarded ABA international Human rights Award by American Bar Association.

== See also ==
- Human rights in Saudi Arabia
