= Abduaziz al Hussan =

Abdulaziz al-Hussan
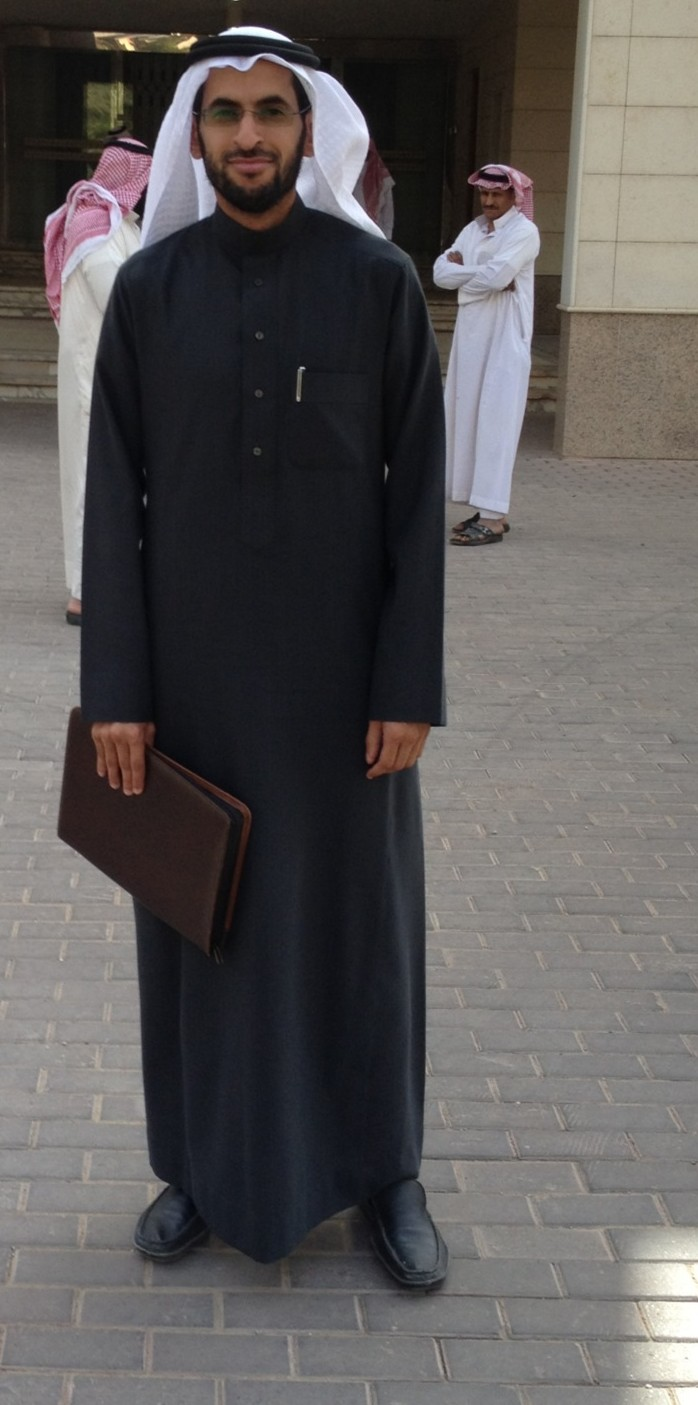
- Abdulaziz al-Hussan after the 9th hearing session of the trial of ACPRA members
- Born: March 10, 1981 (age 45); Riyadh
- Education: King Saud University
- Occupation: lawyer

Abdulaziz bin Mohammed al-Hussan is a Saudi Arabian lawyer and reformist born on March 10, 1981, in Riyadh, the kingdom of Saudi Arabia.

== Education ==
Al Hussan attended in 1999 the King Saud University in Riyadh, where he graduated with a Bachelor of Law (LLB) degree in 2002. He went to Cambridge to study English and legal English and spent the year of 2003 studying in the United Kingdom.

He also holds a Master of Law (LLM) from Indiana University Maurer School of Law in Bloomington 2007, he studied Sharia with different scholars and have done extensive research in Islamic Law.

== Legal career ==
Abdulaziz al-Hussan has over a decade of extensive experience at law firms as he worked with the largest law firm in the world, Clifford Chance in Washington, D.C., and with different international law firms in their offices in Riyadh such Trowers & Hamlins.

He also advised leading travel, telecommunications, insurance, pharmaceutical and real estate companies based in Saudi Arabia. Besides that, he is an expert in Islamic law & Finance.

In 2010, he founded Osool Law Firm, one of the largest law firms in Saudi Arabia with high-profile clients including the largest Islamic bank in the world and different national, GCC, non-GCC and multinational companies including high-profile individuals. His law firm is specialising in Corporate, Capital Market, Insurance, Real Estate, Construction, Foreign Investments, Islamic Finance, Litigation, Arbitration and Alternative Dispute Resolution.

Al Hussan worked as managing partner at Osool Law Firm from August 2010 till becoming its senior legal advisor from July 2013 to July 2015. Now he is a partner at Osool US in alliance with Osool Law Firm.

== Humans rights activism ==
In late 2011, following the Arab Spring, Lawyer Abdulaziz al-Hussan began to represent the cases of political detainees as pro bono and many detainees’ families began to approach him for help.

On March 11, 2013, he used Twitter to share an allegation of government abuses against his clients, two of the most well-known human rights activists in Saudi Arabia and co founders of Saudi Civil and Political Rights Association (ACPRA): Mohammad Fahad al-Qahtani, an Indiana University educated economics professor and Abdullah al-Hamid, a professor of Arabic Literature and Poetry. Both had been jailed for advocating for fair and public trials of political detainees and for freedom of speech.

He tweeted: “We just came out of Malaz Prison and my clients have refused to meet us in handcuffs. The prison administrator refused to unchain them and asked us to bring an order from the governorate”.

Less than 24 hours later, he was summoned for interrogation over his tweets and the governor of Riyadh issued immediately a statement that Al Hussan was “trying to provide inaccurate information about the government”: “I was interrogated for two hours. Others had tweeted the same information about the prisoners, but I was targeted personally because of my history with human rights cases”, says Abdulaziz Al Hussan to Elisabeth Andrews.

Then, he was targeted by pro-government media and his license to practice law was challenged by the Saudi Ministry of Justice.

The government of Saudi Arabia has threaten him to use the Interpol as tool against him if he travels out of the US, which he did to Europe where he holds meetings and present lectures in the UK, Belgium and the Netherlands in cooperation with Amnesty International. He became legal advisor on pro bone basis to many NGOs including Amnesty International. A warrant issued against him by the Saudi Government because of his human rights and reform works.

Instead of waiting to face a sentence of 5 to 15 years of prison or at least be placed on travel ban, al-Hussan chose to leave Saudi Arabia: “You have to choose between exile and prison, and I thought I would be more useful in exile”, he says.

== Academic career ==
He quickly arranged to move to Bloomington, Indiana, in the US after contacting David C. Williams, the executive director at the Center for Constitutional Democracy about a possible post as a visiting scholar.

He worked at Indiana University from May 2013 until August 2015 as visiting scholar, he was responsible for the Arabian Peninsula program of the Center for Constitutional Democracy, where he worked on designing a constitution for the Kingdom of Saudi Arabia and he published a summary of his research in couple of articles in Arabic titled “the possible Kingdom”. He focused on researching Islamic constitutionalism and reform in the Kingdom.

From September 2014 to August 2015, he worked as senior fellow at Indiana University School of Global and International Studies. In August 2015, he was invited to join Iowa College of Law as a research scholar, which has continues to do.

On December 1, 2015, he founded the Dir`iyah Institution on Washington, D.C., which is an independent non-profit institution dedicated to studies of the Arabian Peninsula with focus on constitutional law, reform, political science and history. The board of the institution consists of many scholars from different countries in the Arabian Peninsula and the US.

== Writing career ==
Al Hussan is a columnist in different Arabic newspapers. In his articles, he submits proposals for political reforms in Saudi Arabia.

== Professional memberships ==
Al Hussan is admitted to practice law in the Kingdom of Saudi Arabia and member of the American Bar Association.
