= FYM =

FYM may refer to:

- Farmyard manure
- Fayetteville Municipal Airport (Tennessee), IATA code FYM
- Free Youth Movement (Kurdistan), a Kurdish pro-democracy political movement
- Frontiers for Young Minds, an academic journal aimed at young people
- FYM, a song by Joyner Lucas from the 2017 album 508-507-2209
- FYM, a 2014 song by Jennavive Jackson
- FYM, a 2014 song by Meek Mill
- F.Y.M., a 2021 song by A Day to Remember
