= Abdullah al-Hamid =

Saudi poet and activist (1950–2020)

- التميمي عبد الله علي حامد الحامد
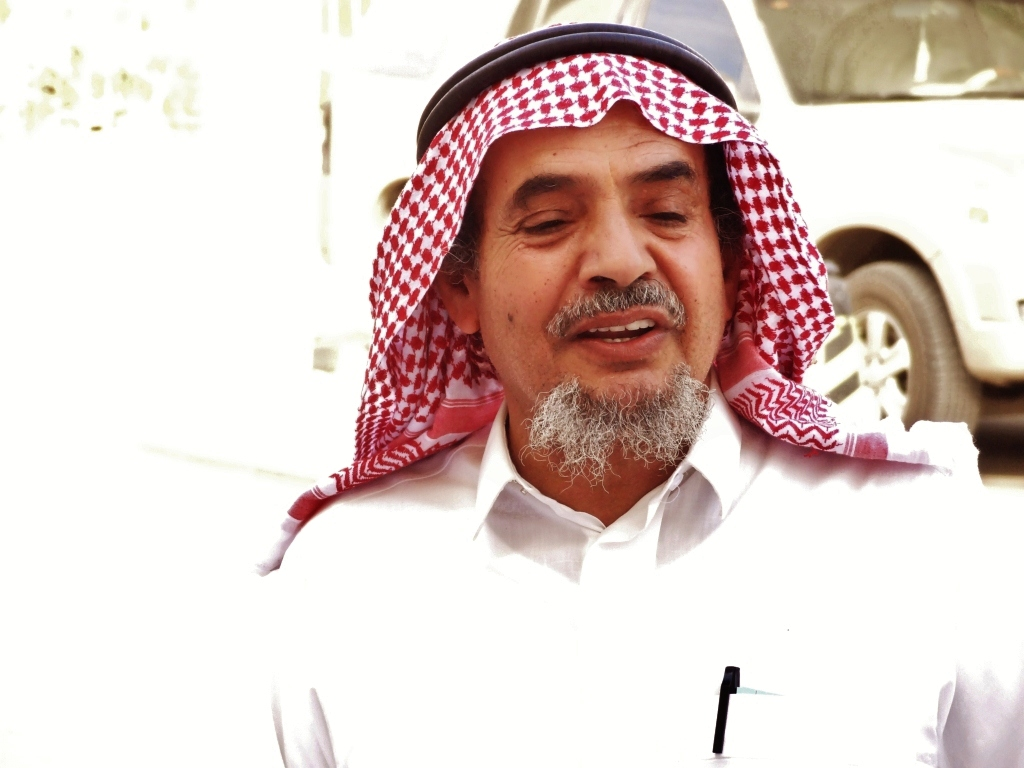
- Abdullah al-Hamid
- Born: 12 July 1950; Buraidah
- Died: 24 April 2020 (aged 69); Riyadh
- Burial place: Riyadh
- Other name: Abu Bilal
- Occupation: Political activist
- Known for: Saudi poet, Arabic professor, human rights activist and a co-founder of the Saudi Civil and Political Rights Association
- Height: 1.63
- Awards: Right Livelihood Award

Abdullah Hamid Ali al-Hamid (1950-2020) (Arabic: عبد الله حامد علي التميمي الحامد) or Abu Bilal was a Saudi poet, Arabic professor, human rights activist and a co-founder of the Saudi Civil and Political Rights Association (ACPRA). He was imprisoned several times for calling for the establishment of a constitutional monarchy in Saudi Arabia.

In May 2005, Dr. Abdullah al-Hamid was sentenced to seven years in prison for "showing dissent and disobeying the ruler" after calling for reforms. He was pardoned and released on 8 August 2005.

In 2008, al-Hamid served a four-month prison term for "incitement to protest" after supporting a demonstration of women who were protesting the detention of relatives. The demonstration took place in front of Buraidah prison, in central Saudi Arabia. Demonstrations in Saudi's eastern province by members of the Shiite minority group calling for the release of prisoners have at times turned deadly. In 2018, he was awarded the Right Livelihood Award, together with other jailed activists and Waleed Abulkhair for "their visionary and courageous efforts, guided by universal human rights principles, to reform the totalitarian political system in Saudi Arabia."

== 2012 legal case ==
On 1 September 2012 Abdullah al-Hamid appeared in the Specialized Criminal Court together with Mohammad al-Qahtani. Both read their defense statements to the court. The charges against al-Hamid include "spreading chaos, destabilizing public order, attempting to impede development in the country and questioning the integrity of official clerics by accusing them of being tools for the royal family". If convicted, he could face up to five years in prison. Another ACPRA co-founder, Mohammed al-Bajadi, received a four-year jail sentence on similar charges in April.

=== End of trial ===
On 9 March 2013, al-Hamid was sentenced to serve 5 years in prison, as well as to serve 6 years of a previous prison term that had been pardoned by King Abdullah in 2006, according to Abdulaziz Al-Shubaily, an ACRPA member who said he attended the criminal court session in Riyadh. Al-Shubaily reported that the courtroom was "full of journalists, activists, as well as a heavy security presence." Mohammad al-Qahtani was sentenced to 10 years in the same case. The court also ordered the ACRPA to be closed, their funds confiscated, and their social media shut down.

=== Arrest of al-Hamid's lawyers ===
Matrouk al-Faleh was arrested 19 May 2008, at his office at King Saud University in Riyadh, where he was professor of political science, and released on 10 January 2009. Al-Faleh, who had been acting as attorney for al-Hamid and his brother, Issa al-Hamid, spent seven months in prison, held without charges in solitary confinement. It is believed the arrest was related to a letter written by al-Faleh detailing prison conditions after visiting Issa and Abdullah al-Hamid at al-Buraida prison. Al-Faleh is a member of the Paris-based Arab Commission for Human Rights.

Abdulaziz al-Hussan, who defended Mohammad al-Qahtani and Abdullah al-Hamid, was detained and interrogated in the spring of 2013, shortly after posting to Twitter about his clients’ detention conditions. Rather than face a travel ban, which are typically imposed on anyone arrested, Al-Hussan moved to Bloomington Indiana, as visiting scholar at Indiana University's Center for Constitutional Democracy.

== International reaction ==
On 7 September 2012, Amnesty International called for charges against al-Hamid and Mohammad al-Qahtani to be dropped, saying the case appeared to be "based solely on their legitimate work to defend human rights in Saudi Arabia and their criticism of the authorities." The organization called for a letter-writing campaign to the offices of the Saudi king and the minister of interior. In 2018, he was awarded the Right Livelihood Award.

== Death ==
In January 2020, al-Hamid, who had hypertension, was advised by a doctor that he needed open-heart surgery, but "prison authorities threatened to cut off his contact with his family if he told his relatives about his condition".

On 9 April 2020, al-Hamid was comatose and transferred to critical care after suffering a stroke, for which Amnesty International demanded his release. Shortly after, while still under detention on 24 April 2020, he died at the age of 69.

== See also ==
- Walid Fitaihi
