= Abdulaziz al-Shubaily =

Abdulaziz al-Shubaily is a prominent Saudi human rights advocate. In 2010, al-Shubaily joined the Saudi Civil and Political Rights Association (ACPRA), which has advocated for release of political prisoners and greater respect for human rights in Saudi Arabia. al-Shubaily has served as a lawyer for families of men held arbitrarily and without charge by Saudi authorities for months and years after their arrests, and has signed public statements calling for the release of arbitrary detainees, establishment of a constitutional monarchy, the right to peaceful assembly, and the popular election of members of the Saudi Shura Council. On May 29, the Specialized Criminal Court convicted him and sentenced him to eight years in prison and an eight-year ban on travel abroad for his peaceful activities. He remains out on bail pending appeal.

On January 10, 2017, the Specialized Criminal Court re-sentenced al-Shubaily to eight years in prison, an eight-year travel ban, and an eight-year ban on using social media after his release. The charges against him included "incitement against public order," "insulting the judiciary," "describing the ruling Saudi state – unjustly and wrongly – as a police state," and "participating in an unlicensed association." As of February 2017, he remained out of prison on bail, pending appeal.

In September 2017, al-Shubaily was arrested again, along with Issa al-Hamid, another ACPRA co-founder.

== See also ==
- Walid Fitaihi
