= Political prisoners in Saudi Arabia =

Dissidents have been detained as political prisoners in Saudi Arabia during the 1990s, 2000s, 2010s, 2020s and earlier. Protests and sit-ins calling for political prisoners to be released took place during the 2011–2012 Saudi Arabian protests in many cities throughout Saudi Arabia, with security forces firing live bullets in the air on 19 August 2012 at a protest at al-Ha'ir Prison. As of 2012, recent estimates of the number of political prisoners in Mabahith prisons range from a denial of any political prisoners at all by the Ministry of Interior, to 30,000 by the UK-based Islamic Human Rights Commission and the BBC.

== Reports of arbitrary detention ==
The UK-based Islamic Human Rights Commission claims that political prisoners in Saudi Arabia are usually arbitrarily detained without charge or trial. The Commission describes Saudi Arabian political imprisonment as "an epidemic" that includes "reformists, human rights activists, lawyers, political parties, religious scholars, bloggers, individual protestors, as well as long-standing government supporters who merely voiced mild and partial criticism of government policy."

== 1990s ==
Following the 1990–91 Gulf War, a range of Saudi Arabian intelligentsia ranging from academics to religious scholars, signed public declarations calling for political reform, and in 1993 created the Committee for the Defense of Legitimate Rights (CDLR), whose spokesperson was Mohammad al-Massari. A "comprehensive campaign of mass arrests" was used in response. Detainees included al-Massari and other CDLR members, lawyer Suliman al-Reshoudi and surgeon Sa'ad Al-Faqih. The 1990s political prisoners were released under various conditions including travel and employment restrictions and house arrest.

== 2000s ==
Bombings in Saudi Arabia during 2003–2006 by al-Qaeda in the Arabian Peninsula (AQAP) were used by Saudi authorities as justification for detaining critics of United States (US) and Saudi foreign policy as well as reformists. A mass arrest of academics, human rights activists and reformists, including Suliman al-Reshoudi, took place on 2 February 2007. It was described by Saudi authorities as "a successful counter-terrorism operation".

=== Prisoner-release protests ===
In November 2008, twenty human rights activists started a two-day hunger strike to call for al-Reshoudi and the other 2 February 2007 detainees to be released. Mohammad Fahad al-Qahtani of ACPRA stated that petitions calling for the activists to receive fair trials and better conditions of detention had been ignored, and that freedom of speech and freedom of assembly were not respected in Saudi Arabia. Adalaksa.org described the hunger strike as "the first co-ordinated multiple-location hunger strike in Saudi Arabia".

== 2010s ==
=== Detentions ===
According to the Islamic Human Rights Commission, "many independent political, activist and advocacy groups had been established" by 2010. Some of those detained included tribal leader Mukhlif al-Shammari who was charged with "annoying others" in his opinion articles published in a local newspaper and online; as well as assistant professor of law Muhammad al-Abdul Karim for publishing an article "The crisis of conflict amongst the governing wings in Saudi Arabia" online on 22 November 2010, and the 18-year-old university student Thamir Abdul Karim al-Khidr for his involvement in a human rights group and to pressure his father.

The Umma Islamic Party was created on 10 February 2011, declaring that the release of 188 political prisoners would constitute an important step towards political reform. Most of the party's cofounders were detained on 17 February 2011 and all but one conditionally released later in 2011 after signing declarations that they would not carry out "anti-government activity". The release conditions included travel bans and teaching bans.

Detentions of dissidents during the 2011–2012 Saudi Arabian protests included well-known activists such as Mohammed Saleh al-Bejadi, who was arrested on 21 March 2011 for his campaigning for the release of political prisoners, and "previously unknown individuals who have become overnight icons of the protest movement in Saudi Arabia", such as Khaled al-Johani, arrested on 11 March 2011 "Day of Rage". In March 2012, Amnesty International estimated the total amount of arrests related to the protests since March 2011 to be "hundreds". It stated that "most have been released without charge", some remained arbitrarily detained, and some were "charged with vague security-related and other offences".

=== Grievance Board ===
A legal defence team for Suliman al-Reshoudi filed a court case in the Grievances Board against the Ministry of Interior/Mabahith on 16 August 2009 on the grounds that 2 February 2007 detentions were arbitrary. Eight court sessions were held, and the case was dismissed in the eighth session "for lack of jurisdiction". The eighth (final) session was attended by representatives of ACPRA, the Human Rights First Society, the National Society for Human Rights, and international journalists. Official Mahabith representatives were absent from the session, but Mabahith plainclothes agents were present in the corridors near the courtroom and in the courtroom itself and tried to prevent human rights organisation representatives and journalists from entering the courtroom. ACPRA concluded that the trial had shown "tremendous benefits", in that the Ministry of Interior had been brought the detainees to court in the presence of human rights activists and journalists, had allowed the detainees contact with lawyers, and had established the right to appear before the Grievances Board despite the Ministry's opposition.

=== Prisoner-release protests ===
Protests and sit-ins calling for political prisoners to be released occurred repeatedly during the 2011–2012 Saudi Arabian protests. These took place at the Ministry of Interior in Riyadh on 20 March 2011 and in April and May 2011 in Qatif, al-Awamiyah and Hofuf in the Eastern Province. 20 March Riyadh protest included Suliman al-Reshoudi's daughter, 30 other women and 200 men. Similar protests took place in Riyadh and Buraidah in December 2011, near al-Ha'ir Prison and in Dammam.

In August 2012, Eastern Province protestors stated that their aim was for "all Shia and Sunni" detainees to be freed. On 19 August 2012 al-Ha'ir Prison protest, security forces fire live bullets in the air.

=== Death penalty ===
In 2016, Ali Sa'eed al-Ribh, whose trial judgement indicates that he was under 18 at the time of some of his crimes, was executed. As a state party to the UN Convention on the Rights of the Child, Saudi Arabia is legally obliged to ensure that no one under 18 at the time of a crime is sentenced to death or to life in prison without the possibility of release. Ali al-Nimr, Abdullah al-Zaher and Dawood al-Marhoon, were arrested individually in 2012. Aged 17, 16 and 17, respectively, they currently stand sentenced to death. On 10 July, 2017, Abdulkareem al-Hawaj had his death sentence upheld on appeal. He was found guilty of crimes committed when he was 16. The four young men were convicted of security-related offences after taking part in anti-government protests.

== 2015 ==
On July 15, 2015, Saudi Arabian writer and commentator Dr. Zuhair Kutbi has been sentenced to four years in prison without clear charges following an interview at the Rotana Khaleejia TV channel in which he discussed his ideas for peaceful reform in Saudi Arabia to become a constitutional monarchy, and talked about combatting religious and political repression. Zuhair Kutbi's lawyer and son said half the sentence was suspended, but that he was also banned from writing for 15 years and travelling abroad for five, and fined $26,600.

== 2017–2020 ==
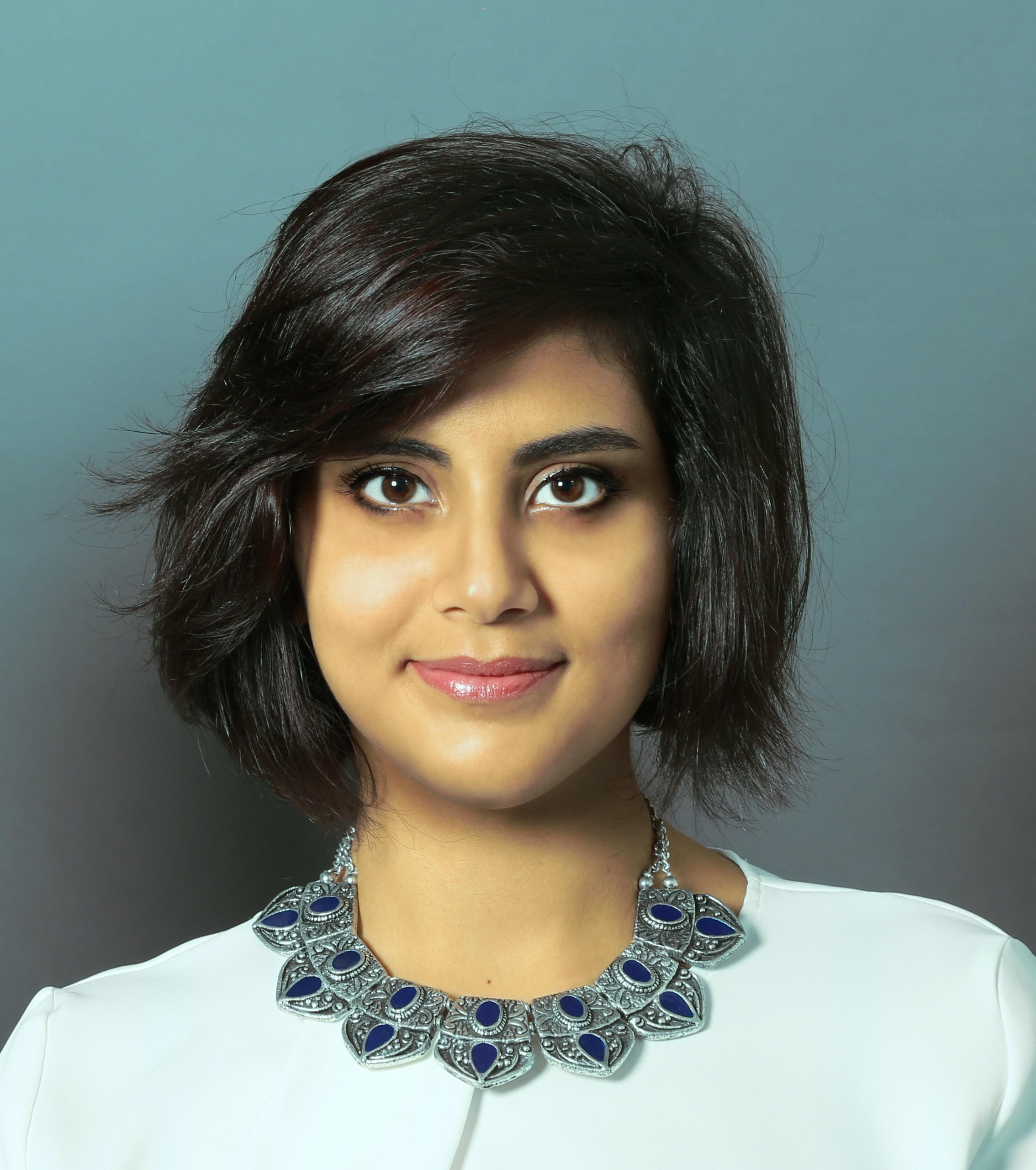
Loujain al-Hathloul, arrested and tortured during the 2018–2019 Saudi crackdown on feminists

In 2017, Dr. Walid Fitaihi, a dual citizen of Saudi Arabia and the United States, was detained along with 200 other prominent Saudis on charges of corruption from Ritz Carlton in Riyadh. According to The New York Times 2019 report, Fitaihi was subjected to extreme torture in the forms of beating, whipping, stripping and electrocution. The Harvard-trained physician remained imprisoned without any public charges or trial as of March 2019.

In September 2017, a reformist scholar of Islamic law, Salman al-Ouda was arrested by Saudi authorities for "terrorism and conspiracy against the state", along with some other prominent activists and preachers. After three years of solitary confinement in Saudi, al-Ouda's son, Abdullah Alaoudh highlighted in a December 2020 opinion piece in The New York Times that the physical and mental health of his father was declining. He said medical malpractice and negligence was common in Saudi prisons. Appealing the president-elect Joe Biden’s administration, he said that as per the lawyers, the Kingdom was seeking death penalty for Salman al-Ouda on 37 charges.

Since May 2018, many Saudi Arabian political activists, including Loujain al-Hathloul, Eman al-Nafjan, Aziza al-Yousef, Samar Badawi, Nassima al-Sada, Mohammad al-Rabe'a and Dr Ibrahim al-Modeimigh, have been arbitrarily detained in the Dhahban Central Prison, with a strong focus on arrests of women's rights activists. As of November 2018, the activists remained in detention without any charges and with no legal representation.

According to the reports published by Human Rights Watch, Amnesty International and ALQST, activists face sexual harassment, torture and other forms of ill-treatment during interrogation. Under the Mabahith secret police agency, women activists are tortured by the Saudi interrogators with electric shocks and whippings. Dhahban Prison authorities have also warned the detainees against disclosing any accounts of torture or prison procedures to family members.

Media outlets, including The Wall Street Journal and The Washington Post have also reported about the alleged torture.

On 1 March 2019, Saudi Princess Basmah bint Saud bin Abdulaziz, a prominent human rights activist and granddaughter of the country's founding king, Abdul Aziz Ibn Saud, was abducted from her home in Jeddah and imprisoned along with her daughter, Souhoud Al-Sharif. Crown Prince Mohammed bin Salman issued her arrest and detention for possessing a fake passport, when she was trying to allegedly flee Saudi Arabia. Though the mother and daughter are not subject to any charges or an ongoing investigation, they still remain imprisoned. On 16 June 2020, the Fox News documented that the family members of the imprisoned Saudi princess are now fearing the worst about her health. They are claiming that they have no idea whether she's dead or alive, as there is no contact with her since April 2020.

On 28 March 2019, Saudi released three human rights activists among the group of detainees including Aziza al-Yousef, Eman al-Nafjan and Dr Rokaya Mohareb, on bail. The authorities promised to release eight others, arrested on human rights activism charges, on 31 March. A day prior to the release, during the hearing one of women told the judges that while she was in detention, several intoxicated men took her from her cell to a secret location and tortured her. The women were caned on their backs and thighs, electrocuted and waterboarded by masked men. A few women were also groped and forced to break their fast in the month of Ramdan and were threatened with rape and death. The government has denied charges of abuse.

By the end of March 2019, medical reports of the political prisoners of the kingdom were leaked. The reports stated that the political prisoners were suffering from severe cases of malnutrition and cuts, bruises and burns. Despite the government's continuous denial about the torture, political prisoners faced extreme physical abuse. Some of the women prisoners had also been subjected to lashings and electric shock. The medical reports were prepared for King Salman, along with a recommendation that asked to pardon all the prisoners or release the ones with major health issues.

In 2019, Human Rights Watch urged the Saudi authorities to release Waleed Abu al-Khair, a prominent lawyer and human rights activist who is serving a sentence of 15 years in al-Dhahban prison. Abu al-Khair was arrested in 2014 for his peaceful human rights advocacy, though the Specialized Criminal Court (Saudi Arabia) found him guilty on 6 charges, including “harming public order in the state and its officials” and “inflaming public opinion and disparaging and insulting judicial authority”. In addition to 15-years in prison, he has been imposed with a travel ban of 15 years and a fine of 200,000 Riyals.

On 17 April 2019, the fourth hearing in the trial of 11 activists in the group including Loujain al-Hathloul, Eman al-Nafjan and Aziza al-Yousef was cancelled due to "private reasons", with no announcement of a revised date. The Guardian judged that the treatment of political prisoners had not improved in Saudi Arabia despite international pressure.

On 14 May 2019, Amnesty International condemned Saudi Arabia for detaining several women human rights defenders a year earlier and torturing them. Amnesty International's Middle East Research Director stated, "Today marks a year of shame for Saudi Arabia" and a "shameful day" for Saudi Arabia's "closest allies in the West, namely the US, the UK and France," for having prioritised arms deals instead of putting pressure on Saudi authorities to release the arbitrarily detained activists.

On 16 March 2020, Saad bin Khalid Al Jabry's children were taken from their home and detained by about 50 state security officers who arrived in 20 cars. According to al-Jabry, his children were held hostage. The house was searched and CCTV memory cards were removed to destroy evidence of the raid. Al-Jabry stated that no charges and reason were disclosed to the family and they did not know if their children were alive or dead.

On 8 June 2020, the Human Rights Watch reported that Saudi authorities arrested a Yemeni blogger and human rights activist, Mohamad al-Bokari. He was arrested on 8 April 2020, for criticising human rights violations in Saudi Arabia and stating his support for LGBT rights. The blogger was held in al-Malaz prison in Riyadh, where he was subjected to a forced anal exam, a homophobic form of torture. He was in pretrial detention under physical and psychological duress.

On 20 November 2020, human rights charity Grant Liberty reported that jailed political prisoners and women's rights activist have died, been sexually assaulted and tortured inside Saudi Arabian jails. The report alleges that since 2017, under crown prince Mohammed bin Salman's 'de facto' rule of Saudi Arabia, 309 political prisoners have suffered human rights abuses.

== 2020–2023 ==
Saad Ibrahim Al-Madi a 72-year-old Saudi-US citizen subsequently sentenced to 19 years in prison over a series of Tweets criticizing Saudi Crown Prince Mohammed bin Salman. Al Madi was released after being detained more than half of year in Saudi. But, he remained under a travel ban and wasn’t allowed to return to Florida.

== Number of political prisoners ==
Claims and estimates of the number of political prisoners held in Saudi Arabia in 2011–2012 range from no political prisoners to 30,000.

=== Governmental sources ===
In May 2011, Ministry of Interior spokesperson Mansour al-Turki stated that there are no political prisoners in Saudi Arabia, saying, "Allegations of political prisoners are not true. Every prisoner has the full right for a fair trial and can hire a lawyer to defend him ... Some prisoners don't want to reveal the full truth to their family members, and some family members can't believe the truth? ... Saudi Arabia doesn't use the police and intelligence in stifling dissent." On 1 September 2012, Gulf News reported a Ministry Interior statement that there are no political prisoners in Saudi Arabia.

A 2011 estimate by Mansour al-Turki cited by the Islamic Human Rights Commission is 5000 political prisoners. A March 2011 governmental estimated cited by the BBC was 10,000 political prisoners.

=== Opposition groups ===
At its 10 February 2011 founding, the Umma Islamic Party called for the release of "188 prominent political prisoners", whom it listed. In March 2011, the BBC quoted an estimate of 30,000 political prisoners by "opposition activists".

=== Human rights organisations ===
In September 2011, the Islamic Human Rights Commission stated that the "known political prisons in Saudi Arabia have a capacity to hold 10,000" and that the over-occupation rate was about a factor of three, thus inferring about 30,000 political prisoners altogether.

== See also ==
- Human rights in Saudi Arabia
