= Jennavive Jackson =

American singer

Jennavive Jackson (born October 3, 1987) is an American singer and songwriter, and independent recording artist. At times she has been active in Germany as well as the United States.

== Early life ==
Raised in a large family on a farm in Northern California, her first exposure to music was in church. After the events of 9/11, Jackson enlisted in the United States Air Force.

On active duty, she served in S. Korea, Germany, and California, as well as completed two tours of duty in Salerno, Afghanistan. While stationed overseas in Germany, she was selected for a USO style tour for the United States Air Force entertainment group, Tops in Blue. After completing the tour, she moved back to Germany to pursue music, where she quickly rose to number one in Mannheim, Germany for Country Music by 2014, and was featured on the Voice of Germany blind auditions.

She recorded an original album entitled Unspoken, which was released on December 13, 2014. Her original hits from the album included "Pill Too Big", "No Hope" and "Jane Doe". Jackson announced via her official website that a German EP will be released on May 1, 2015. Jackson is also expected to release a second English album in mid 2015. On the day of her album release, December 13, 2014, Jackson was featured in Die Rheinpfalz newspaper in Rheinland Pfalz, Germany.

She plays both original songs and cover versions of pop and R&B songs in an indie western style. She has been featured alongside musicians such as V-LAD, Adam Will (saxophone), A. Arango (piano), and Annie Muhlenbruch (theatre). In February 2004, Jackson opened up for Brian McKnight on his tour in southeast Asia.

== Performances ==
=== Singing ===
She has played at venues in New York City, Las Vegas, Los Angeles, Amsterdam, Mannheim and Frankfurt. As a performer for the military and as a solo artist, Jackson has performed shows on Fremont Street in Las Vegas, Mt Rushmore Plaza Auditorium, New York City's Pat Reilly's Music Bar, Arneson Theater in San Antonio, Mondavi Center at UC Davis, and Keystone Theater in Japan.

=== Acting ===
As actress in the theatre group Vacaville Gaslighters, Jackson has played supporting roles in various small community plays and murder mystery theater.

In 2013, Jackson performed in a film remake tribute to Taxi, entitled Taxi: The Tribute, written and produced by Vlad Panov. Jackson played the part of Elaine. The 20 minute film was released on the 100th anniversary of the checker taxi cab.

== Charity work ==
While living in New York City as a songwriter in 2013, Jackson began a non-profit community organization that encourages unity through songwriting contest and meetings. On December 12, 2013, Key To Unity held their first annual songwriting contest in Williamsburg, New York.

== Discography ==
=== Singles ===
==== Charts ====
Single	Year	Chart
"No Hope"	2014	#1 - German Country
"Dreams"	2014	#1 - German Country
"Pill Too Big"	2014	#2 - German Independent

=== Albums ===
==== Unspoken ====
Track number	Song title	Released
1	"FYM"	December 13, 2014
2	"Jane Doe"	December 13, 2014
3	"Pursuit	December 13, 2014
4	"Enemy Territory"	December 13, 2014
5	"Need You (To Go)"	December 13, 2014
6	"Love Me Numb"	December 13, 2014
7	"No Hope"	December 13, 2014
8	"Pill Too Big"	December 13, 2014
9	"Dreams"	December 13, 2014
10	"Keep Going"	December 13, 2014
