= Trowers & Hamlins =

British law firm

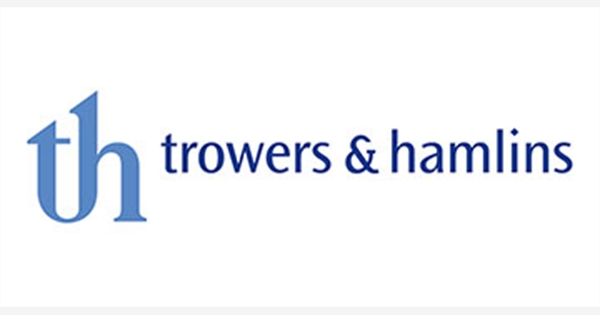
- Headquarters: City of London
- No. of offices: 11
- No. of lawyers: 600+
- Major practice areas: General practice
- Key people: Sara Bailey (Senior Partner)
- Revenue: ▲£155 million (2025)
- Profit per equity partner: £380k (2025)
- Date founded: 1777 (London)
- Company type: English LLP
- Website: www.trowers.com

Trowers & Hamlins LLP is an international law firm with offices throughout the UK, Middle East and Asia-Pacific. It has over 170 partners and more than 1000 employees.

Headquartered in London, Trowers & Hamlins was founded nearly 250 years ago.

== History ==
In 1777 the practice was run by Richard and John Woodhouse. Since that time it has undergone more than 20 changes of identity and amalgamations. Walter Trower (who was knighted in 1915) joined the partnership in 1886, and the name Hamlin originated in a firm called Hamlin & Grammer which was practising in 1875. Though the two firms using these names had been in association for many years, it was not until 1987 that they finally integrated to become Trowers & Hamlins.

== Offices ==
During the last 50 years Trowers & Hamlins has expanded considerably. The Manchester office opened in 1973, followed by the opening of offices in Oman (1980), Exeter (1984), Dubai (1991), Abu Dhabi (1993), Bahrain (1998), Cairo (1999), and Birmingham (2011). The Cairo office closed in 2014. The firm further expanded its international footprint with new offices in Singapore (2024) and Saudi Arabia (2025).

Trowers & Hamlins also merged with Devon-based law firm, Stones Solicitors (2015). Outside the UK it has approximately 150 lawyers working across its international offices.

In 2012 Trowers & Hamlins opened a non-trading representative office in Kuala Lumpur, Malaysia, having secured unique approval from the Malaysia Investment Development Authority (MIDA). Trowers & Hamlins was the first foreign firm to open in this manner in Malaysia. In 2015, the firm was the first foreign law firm to receive a Qualified Foreign Law Firm licence in Malaysia and now operates an office there. Today, Trowers & Hamlins has over 1100 staff in its UK, Middle East and South East Asia offices.
