= Mujtahidd (activist) =

- Occupations: Saudi activist and whistleblower
- Known for: Twitter account
- Website: mujtahidd on X

Mujtahidd (Arabic: مجتهد) is the Twitter handle of a pseudonymous activist, described as a 'whistleblower' and a 'household name among Saudis who use social media', who publishes information alleging to expose corruption, inner state of affairs, and under the table workings of politics within the Saudi royal family. His Twitter account was created in 2011, and before 2015, he focused mostly on exposing corruption and the rise to power of Khaled al-Tuwaijri, previous King Abdullah's chief of court. In 2015, his Twitter account was suspended after he posted a series of documents regarding Princess Maha Al Sudairi (divorced wife of former Interior Minister Nayef bin Abdulaziz).

== Recent developments ==
After creating a new account and regaining his old username, his tweets now focus on Saudi Crown Prince Mohammed bin Salman's consolidation of power and the new status quo of Saudi Arabia under the crown prince. His identity is disputed, with the most popular theories being that he is a member of the Saudi royal family or the London-based opposition activist Sa'ad Al-Faqih.

Focusing on political analysis, investigative journalism, and 'leaking information' from within members of the Saudi royal family, Mujtahid has been termed the 'Julian Assange of Saudi Arabia' by Western news outlets. A survey in which 10,000 people participated has shown that 60% of Saudis believe in Mujtahid's claims of leaked information while 67% believes that what he is doing "serves as a watchdog for corruption that is related to the royal family."

According to Madawi Al-Rasheed, Mujtahidd was the first to predict that crown prince Mohammed bin Nayef would be replaced with Mohammed bin Salman, and that Miteb bin Abdullah would be dismissed as the commander of the Saudi Arabian National Guard.

In 2018 Mujtahidd tweeted that Mohammed bin Salman has surrounded himself with foreign security experts, and abandoned the traditional way of co-option of family members of dissidents. Instead, dissidents families who remain in the country are now punished and detained, as a means of pressuring dissidents back to Saudi Arabia.
