= Free Youth Movement =

Free Youth Movement (FYM) (Kurdish: جوڵانەوەى گەنجانى ئازاد) is a youth group that began in the Winters of 2011 in Iraqi Kurdistan by a group of journalists and students to support freedom in the Middle East and the whole world.

== Description ==
Free Youth Movement started its activities in early February 2011. The first activity was at American University of Iraq-Sulaimani, where FYM held a meeting to support the revolutions of Egyptians and Tunisians that were occurring at the time.

FYM foundation and activities were covered by local media widely, at the first week of their activities, more than a dozen of websites and newspapers published news and report on them.
