= Mohammad Fahad al-Qahtani =

Saudi human rights activist (born c. 1965)

- محمد فهد القحطاني
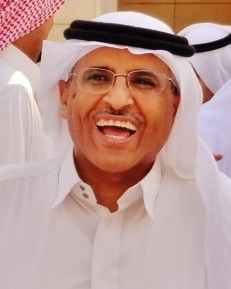
- Al-Qahtani in November 2012
- Born: Mohammad Fahad Muflih al-Qahtani; 1965 or 1966 (age 60–61)
- Occupations: economics professor at the Institute of Diplomatic Affairs, Ministry of Foreign Affairs (Saudi Arabia)
- Known for: co-founding of ACPRA
- Children: 4 (Omar al-Qahtani and Othman al-Qahtani)
- Awards: Right Livelihood Award

Mohammad Fahad Muflih al-Qahtani (محمد فهد مفلح القحطاني, born 1965) is a human rights activist, economics professor and political prisoner who was imprisoned at Al-Ha’ir Prison in Riyadh. Prior to his arbitrary 2012 arrest, he co-founded and later led the Saudi Arabia human rights organisation Saudi Civil and Political Rights Association. Alkarama described al-Qahtani as "one of [the Saudi Arabian judiciary's] most eloquent and fervent critics". On 9 March 2013, al-Qahtani was sentenced to ten years in prison followed by a ten-year travel ban, ostensibly for "co-founding an unlicensed civil association". He carried out several hunger strikes to protest Saudi prison conditions endured during his politically motivated incarceration. Al-Qahtani remained in prison in 2022 and had been intermittently kept in solitary confinement since 2018.

In 2018, he was awarded the Right Livelihood Award, together with other jailed activists Abdullah al-Hamid and Waleed Abulkhair for "their visionary and courageous efforts, guided by universal human rights principles, to reform the totalitarian political system in Saudi Arabia." Their awards were received on their behalf by his son Omar al-Qahtani and Yahya Assiri.

Al-Qahtani was released from prison on 7 January 2025.

== Education and academic career ==
Mohammad Fahad al-Qahtani has a PhD from Indiana University Bloomington in the United States. As of June 2012, he was employed as an economics professor at the Institute of Diplomatic Affairs of the Saudi Arabian Ministry of Foreign Affairs.

== Human rights activities ==
=== 2008 hunger strike ===
In November 2008, al-Qahtani was among 20 human rights activists who started a two-day hunger strike in protest against the imprisonment without fair, public trials of 11 activists, including Suliman al-Reshoudi and former university professors. Al-Qahtani stated that petitions calling for the activists to receive fair trials and better conditions of detention were ignored, and that freedom of speech and freedom of assembly were not respected in Saudi Arabia.

=== 2009 Saudi Civil and Political Rights Association ===
Al-Qahtani co-founded the Saudi Arabian human rights organisation Saudi Civil and Political Rights Association (ACPRA) in October 2009 together with Mohammed Saleh al-Bejadi and nine others. As of June 2012, he continued to be active in ACPRA.

=== 2011 prisoner demonstration ===
On 5 Feb 2011, about 40 women demonstrated in front of the Interior Ministry in central Riyadh, calling for the release of prisoners. Mohammed al-Qahtani later told Reuters, "The women demand to free people imprisoned in the campaign against terrorism. Many people have been held up for a long time without trial, or have nothing to do with al Qaeda." According to an ACPRA website, they were carrying signs that said, "free our prisoners or try them in a fair public court."

== 2012 court case ==
=== Charges and trial ===
Al-Qahtani was charged in a Saudi court on 18 June 2012 on 11 charges related to his human rights activism, including:

setting up an unlicensed organisation, 'breaking allegiance to the ruler', accusing the judiciary of allowing torture and accepting confessions made under duress, describing the Saudi Arabian authorities as a police state, inciting public opinion by accusing authorities of human rights violations, and turning international organizations against the Kingdom.

If convicted, penalties for al-Qahtani could include a 5-year prison term, a travel ban and a fine. Another founding member of ACPRA, Mohammed al-Bejadi received a four-year jail sentence in April 2012.

One of the charges against al-Qahtani was "sending 'false information presented as facts to the official international mechanisms.'" The human rights organisation Alkarama interpreted this to refer to al-Qahtani's founding role in ACPRA and ACPRA's work with Alkarama in preparing documents to give to the United Nations Working Group on Arbitrary Detention.

Mohammad al-Qahtani's trial started on 1 September 2012 with nine charges, including "setting up an unlicensed organisation and breaking allegiance to the king". The trial of Abdullah al-Hamid, another ACPRA co-founder, started on the same day. Supporters of al-Qahtani and al-Hamid were initially present in the courtroom. Text and photo reports of the trial were published live on the social networking services Twitter and Facebook, which was described by the Sebastian Usher of the BBC as "a measure of transparency that is unusual in Saudi Arabia". The judge ordered some of the audience to leave the court room. According to Al Arabiya, those ordered to leave were mobile phone users, and according to the BBC, those ordered to leave were al-Qahtani's and al-Hamid's supporters and family.

On 9 March 2013, he was found guilty of several charges and sentenced to ten years in prison followed by ten years of travel ban.

=== International reaction ===
On 29 June, the Cairo Institute for Human Rights Studies spoke on al-Qahtani's behalf at the 20th session of the United Nations Human Rights Council, stating its "uttermost concern over the targeting of activists for their cooperation with international human rights protection mechanisms" and referring specifically to the charges against al-Qahtani.

Amnesty International described the charges as "part of a series of recent trials aimed at silencing human rights activists" in Saudi Arabia. Later, it described the sentence as an evidence of "Saudi Arabian authorities' inability to deal with any opinion that contradicts their own." Human Rights Watch described the sentence as being "outrageous."

=== Imprisonment ===
Al-Qahtani was shifted into solitary confinement on 17 December 2018. He carried out several hunger strikes in 2020 and 2021 in protest against prison conditions.

On 26 May 2022, al-Qahtani was assaulted by a mentally ill prisoner. Other prisoners defended al-Qahtani and stopped the assault.

On 7 January 2025, al-Qahtani was conditionally released from prison. He was given a 10-year travel ban, preventing him from visiting his family in the US. Amnesty International called for the travel ban to be cancelled.

== Points of view ==
=== Low-end jobs for Saudi women ===
In 2009, Al-Qatani opposed the opening of housemaid jobs to Saudi women, saying that low-end jobs should be performed by migrant workers. The statement was made in response to a report that 30 Saudi women recruited through an employment agency had taken on jobs as domestic workers. Al-Qahtani criticized the ministry of labor for forcing Saudis into low-end jobs, saying they should instead start from the top, since high-end jobs were readily available, and there were plenty of expatriates to fill the menial jobs.

=== Women to Drive movement ===
On 17 June 2011, Al-Qatani tweeted, "My wife, Maha, and I have just come from a 45-minute drive, she was the driver through Riyadh streets," a reference to the Women2Drive movement, a campaign for Saudi women's right to drive that called for Saudi women to start driving starting 17 June 2011.

=== Human rights ===
Al-Qahtani believes that all people, including those suspected of terrorist activities, have the right to a fair trial.

=== Arab Spring ===
In April 2011, al-Qahtani stated in relation to the Saudi-led Peninsula Shield Force intervention in the Bahraini uprising:

Unfortunately, they are throwing their power, their authority and their leverage to maintain the status quo, and I don't think it's going to survive in the future. I tell you they have taken too many embarrassments during these revolutions. That's not the way you build your own foreign policy.

In early 2011, al-Qahtani believed that "the only serious way to seek change is by slow and concentrated steps". He suggested that the families of political prisoners would be more motivated to carry out street protests, especially if women participated, compared to "liberals". During the Arab Spring events of early 2011, al-Qahtani received telephone calls from political prisoners' families, prior to a 5 February 2011 protest in front of the Ministry of Interior in Riyadh by 50 women. Al-Qahtani stated that "the small group spent the night in jail, but they got serious news coverage in the process."

In June 2012, after being charged in court for his human rights activities, al-Qahtani stated:

The Saudi regime would soon lose its grip, and things would spin out of control. I am still very optimistic about the future because the regime will continue to deteriorate. Political and socioeconomic problems will snowball out of control. Eventually, the regime will fail, and people too would soon realize its failure. I guess it's our destiny to face prison terms, and possibly the loss of our steady source of income. This price, however, is a small token for regaining our people's liberty and freedom.

== See also ==
- Saudi Civil and Political Rights Association (ACPRA)
