= Saud al-Hashimi =

Saudi Arabian human rights activist

Saud Mukhtar al-Hashimi
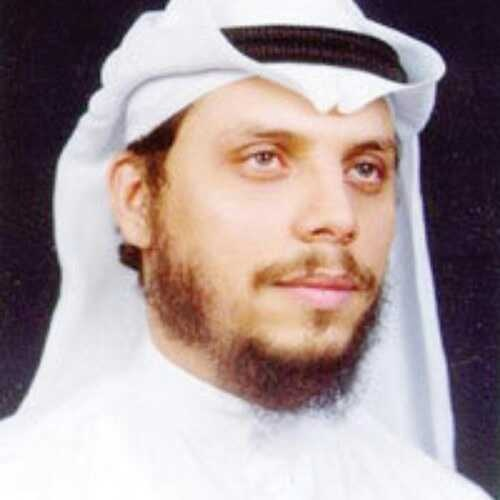
- Born: 1964 (age 61–62); Jeddah, Saudi Arabia
- Education: King Abdulaziz University; King Faisal University
- Occupation: Human rights activist
- Known for: Imprisonment in Dhahban Central Prison

Saud Mukhtar al-Hashimi (Arabic: سعود مختار الهاشمي, born 1964) is a Saudi Arabian doctor.

== Biography ==
Al-Hashimi graduated from King Abdulaziz University in 1988, then got his PhD from the King Faisal University in 1993. He worked as a doctor in Jeddah, he also was a member of World Organization of Family Doctors. He wrote many essays in Al Madina newspaper.

== Arrest and trial ==
Al-Hashimi was arrested in Jeddah in February 2007 along with eight other critics of the Saudi Arabian government (Musa al-Qirni, Suliaman al-Rashudi, Abdul Rahman Khan, Essam Basrawi, Saif al-Din al-Sharif, Fahd al-Qurshi, Abdul Rahman al-Shumayri) who planned to form a political party or human rights organization. The men were detained without charge until August 2010.

During his pre-trial detention, al-Hashimi went on hunger strike for a week, which reportedly caused his guards to strip him down to his underwear and leave him in a cold cell for several hours. He was then forced to confess to "contacting Al-Jazeera television station and to collecting money without the permission of the ruler". According to the Islamic Human Rights Commission (IHRC), he was also tortured with electric shocks in November 2010.

The nine were brought to trial in the Specialized Criminal Court in 2011. Their lawyers were initially denied information on the charges against the men, and the court's sessions were closed to media and observers, leading Amnesty International to criticize the proceedings as "grossly unfair". Al-Hashimi found guilty by the Specialized Criminal Court on charges including "disobeying Saudi Arabia’s king, forming an organization opposing the state, questioning the independence of the judiciary, money laundering and 'supporting terrorism'", and in November was sentenced to 30 years' imprisonment and a fine of 2 million riyals (US$534,000).

== Imprisonment ==
During al-Hashimi's imprisonment, several international human rights groups campaigned on his behalf. The United Nations Working Group on Arbitrary Detention found that his detention was arbitrary and illegal. Amnesty International designated him a prisoner of conscience and stated that al-Hashimi had been jailed for "peaceful exercise of his right to freedom of expression and association". The International Federation for Human Rights and World Organisation Against Torture issued a joint statement calling for "urgent intervention" into the case, including the immediate and unconditional release of al-Hashimi. Human Rights Watch criticized the Saudi Arabian government for keeping al-Hashimi as a "political prisoner", stating that "recycling political prisoners won't appease demands for democratic change". The Muslim Public Affairs Committee UK described al-Hashimi and the other prisoners as "simply advocating peaceful reforms to the political system" and began a petition for their release.

The IHRC reported that as of February 2012, al-Hashimi continued to be kept in solitary confinement following his conviction. In October 2012, Amnesty International reported that al-Hashimi's mother was seriously ill and believed herself to be dying; the organization issued an appeal that he be allowed to visit her at the hospital.
