= Coalition for Freedom and Justice =

- Formation: 25 March 2012
- Purpose: Opposition to the Saudi Arabian Government; Democratic reforms Human Rights
- Headquarters: Qatif
- Location: Eastern Province, Saudi Arabia
- Region served: Saudi Arabia
- Official language: Arabic
- Website: Arabic Facebook Page

The Coalition for Freedom and Justice (Arabic: ائتلاف الحرية والعدالة, romanized: I’tilaf al-hurriyya wa al-'adala), also known as the movement, is a coalition of opposition and reform groups in the 2011–2012 Saudi Arabian protests active in Saudi Arabia's Eastern Province.

The coalition was formed in March 2012, inspired by the decentralised Bahraini 14 February Youth Coalition, and has adopted some of its tactics. The groups have activists from a wide range of ideological backgrounds, but are mostly united by their demands for greater democracy and human rights.

Although only active in Eastern Province, the coalition has a national focus, and has tried to coordinate with different groups in other parts of Saudi Arabia.

The groups that make up the Coalition for Freedom and Justice include:

- Day of Qatifi Rage for the Release of Forgotten Prisoners
- Eastern Province Revolution
- Free Dignity Movement
- Free Youth Movement
- Youth Reform Movement
