= Mohammed Saleh al-Bejadi =

Saudi human rights activist

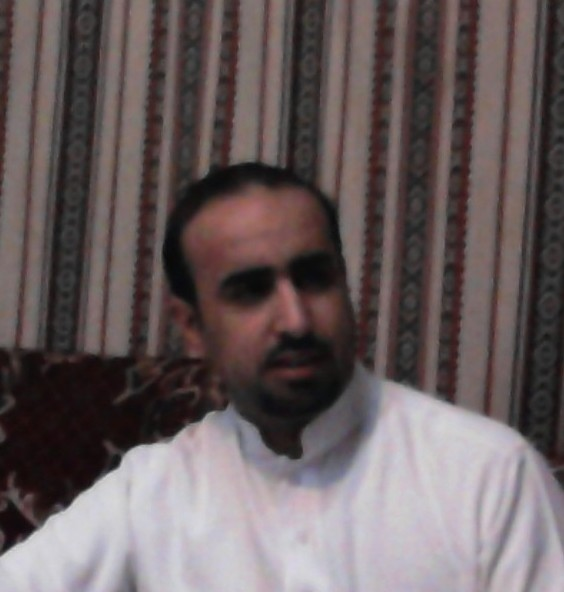
- Born: 1980/1981 (age 45–46) or 1977/1978 (age 47–48)
- Known for: co-founding of ACPRA
- Children: 1 daughter

Mohammed Saleh al-Bejadi (or Muhammad, Salih, al-Bajadi, albjadi; Arabic: محمد البجادي) is a co-founder of the Saudi Arabian human rights organisation Saudi Civil and Political Rights Association (ACPRA) who has campaigned for prisoners' rights since 2007. He spent four months in prison without charge or trial in 2007 and was banned from foreign travel in 2009.

He was arrested 21 March 2011, and on 11 March 2015 he was sentenced to 10 years in prison.

He was released later in 2015, but arrested again in May 2018.

== Human rights activities ==
=== 2007–2008 ===
In 2007, al-Bejadi contacted international media about a sit-in held in front of a provincial governmental authority and calling for the release of prisoners. He was "detained in solitary confinement without charge or trial" from 4 September 2007 to 1 January 2008. He was released "on the condition that he would not organise any fora or gatherings, nor contact any foreign press."

=== 2009 ===
In 2009, al-Bejadi managed a website "Monitor of Human Rights in Saudi Arabia – al-Marsad". In March 2009, he was interrogated by the external security agency, Al Mukhabarat Al A'amah, his passport was confiscated, and he was forbidden from international travel until July 2009 or later. In July, the World Organisation Against Torture and the International Federation for Human Rights protested against the travel ban, saying that it was aimed at "muzzling his freedom of expression".

==== ACPRA ====
In 2009, al-Bejadi and 10 other Saudi human rights activists and academics co-founded a human rights non-governmental organisation, the Saudi Civil and Political Rights Association (ACPRA).

== 2011–2015 detention ==
On 21 March 2011, during the 2011–2012 Saudi Arabian protests, al-Bejadi was arrested along with several other people following a protest calling for the release of political prisoners that had taken place on 20 March. Al-Bejadi was arrested in his house by Mabahith, the Saudi Arabian internal security agency, in Buraidah. Security forces surrounding his house and blockaded roads leading to it. He was arrested in handcuffs and manacles and taken to his office, which was searched for several hours while he remained shackled. ACPRA stated that the arrest was arbitrary, in violation of the Basic Law of Saudi Arabia and the Law of Criminal Procedures. Amnesty International designated al-Bajadi a prisoner of conscience, "held solely for the peaceful exercise of his rights to freedom of expression, assembly and association".

Al-Bejadi was held for four months in solitary confinement and allowed a few minutes each week to telephone to his wife. He was shifted to a 4 metres (13 ft) by 6 metres (20 ft) cell with 9 other prisoners and "bright lighting all day and night". He was denied access to a doctor for 7 months.

In August 2011, al-Bejadi appeared in the Specialized Criminal Court on charges of "insurrection against the ruler, instigating demonstrations, and speaking with foreign [media] channels." Judge al-'Abd al-Latif prevented al-Bejadi's defence lawyers from attending the August trial session. On 3 October 2011, he appeared at a secret meeting of a court which journalists and human rights activists could not attend, on charges of "membership in a banned association, the possession of prohibited books and the intent to harm the reputation of the country".

As of 12 March 2012, 38 people planned a 2-day public hunger strike on 15–16 March 2012, coordinated by ACPRA, calling for al-Bejadi's release. According to ACPRA and Human Rights Watch, al-Bejadi joined the hunger strike himself, and as of 11 April 2012 had been on hunger strike for nearly a month. ACPRA stated that it believed al-Bejadi's life to be in danger, as he had stopped taking water. The Ministry of Interior denied the report, saying that al-Bejadi was "in good health".

On 10 April 2012, al-Bejadi was sentenced to four years' imprisonment and a five-year ban on foreign travel. He was released in 2015.

== 2016–present ==
Following his 2015 release, al-Bejadi stopped public aspects of his human rights advocacy. On 26 October 2016, he wrote a "final tweet", stating, "I will stop writing and participating on all social media accounts for reasons that are not unknown to all of you."

On 24 May 2018, during the 2018–2019 Saudi crackdown on feminists, al-Bejadi was again arrested.

== See also ==
- Abdullah al-Hamid
- Mohammad Fahad al-Qahtani
- Human rights in Saudi Arabia#Human rights organizations
