= Association for the Protection and Defense of Women's Rights in Saudi Arabia =

Saudi non-governmental organization

The Association for the Protection and Defense of Women's Rights in Saudi Arabia is a Saudi non-governmental organization aimed at activism for women's rights. It was founded by Wajeha al-Huwaider and Fawzia al-Uyyouni, and grew out of a 2007 movement to gain for women the right to drive. The association is not officially licensed by the government of Saudi Arabia, and has been warned not to stage demonstrations. In a 2007 interview, al-Huwaider described their goals:

The association will consist of a number of leagues, with each league pursuing a different issue or right... representation for women in shari'a courts; setting a [minimum] age for girls' marriages; allowing women to take care of their own affairs in government agencies and allowing them to enter government buildings; protecting women from domestic violence, such as physical or verbal violence, or keeping her from studies, work, or marriage, or forcing her to divorce…

== History ==
The association's first campaign gathered signatures to petition King Abdullah to allow women to drive. The petition was ignored.

In 2008, the association launched a "No to the Oppression of Women" campaign. The campaign recorded Saudi women speaking about the oppression or violence to which they had been subjected. Their views were recorded with complete assurance of confidentiality, and the recordings uploaded on YouTube. The association described its campaign as giving victims a voice.
