= Committee for the Defense of Human Rights in the Arabian Peninsula =

Committee for the Defense of Human Rights in the Arabian Peninsula (CDHRAP)
- Founded: 1992
- Location: Beirut
- Region served: Saudi Arabia
- Method: monthly newsletter and annual reports in Arabic and English
- Key people: Mohammad Abul Azeem al-Hussain
- Website: cdhrap.net (English/Arabic/Persian)

The Committee for the Defense of Human Rights in the Arabian Peninsula (CDHRAP) is a Saudi Arabian human rights non-governmental organisation based in Beirut.

== Structure and leadership ==
As of 2010, CDHRAP was chaired by Mohammad Abul Azeem al-Hussain.

== Aims and actions ==
The CDHRAP is a Saudi Arabian human rights non-governmental organisation created in 1992 and based in Beirut that states its belief in human rights "guaranteed by international treaties and conventions so long as they do not contradict with Islamic Laws". It declares itself opposed to human rights violations in the Arabian Peninsula, especially against the Shi'a minority. It claims to oppose religion-based discrimination in general. CDHRAP acts by publishing news releases, monthly and annual documents in English, Arabic and Persian and cooperating with international human rights organisations.

== Saudi government reactions ==
In 2001, about ten United States and other software companies competed to provide software for internet censorship in Saudi Arabia. The New York Times identified CDHRAP's website as one of the websites to be blocked.

== See also ==
- Human rights in Saudi Arabia
