= Unified Military Command =

Military force

- القيادة العسكرية الموحدة
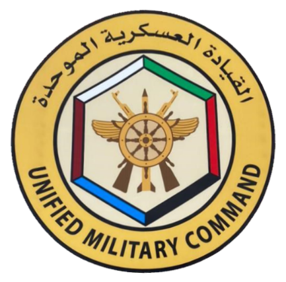
- Active: 1984–present
- Countries: Bahrain; Kuwait; Oman; Saudi Arabia; Qatar; United Arab Emirates
- Allegiance: Gulf Cooperation Council
- Type: Collective security
- Size: 40,000 troops (2011)
- Engagements: Gulf War; Saudi-led intervention in Bahrain

Commanders
- Current commander: Lieutenant General Abdulaziz Ahmed Al-Balawi

The Unified Military Command of the Gulf Cooperation Council (GCC), formerly known as the Peninsula Shield Force (Arabic: قوات درع الجزيرة المشتركة), is a regional military organization that coordinates joint defense and security efforts among the six GCC member states: Bahrain, Kuwait, Oman, Qatar, Saudi Arabia, and the United Arab Emirates. The command was renamed on 5 January 2021, following the GCC summit in Al-Ula, to reflect deeper military integration and cooperation. Its emblem symbolizes unity, protection, and readiness, representing the collective defense capabilities of the GCC countries.

== Creation ==
In 1984, the Gulf Cooperation Council (GCC) decided to create a joint military force of 10,000 soldiers divided into two brigades, called the Peninsula Shield Force, based in Saudi Arabia near the Kuwaiti and Iraqi borders. The PSF is composed of infantry, armor, artillery, and combat support elements from each of the GCC countries. In 1992, the Peninsula Shield Force was headed by a Saudi Arabian, based near King Khalid Military City at Hafar al Batin, and had one infantry brigade of 5,000 men enlisted from all the GCC member states. As of late 2006, the Peninsula Shield Force had 7,000 personnel and functioned as a joint intervention force to defend the joint border of Saudi Arabia, Kuwait, and Iraq. In November 2006, the GCC Joint Defense Council considered a Saudi proposal to expand the capabilities of the Shield and to establish a joint command and control system.

In December 2007, Kuwait's National Security Council chief Sheikh Ahmed Fahad Al Ahmed Al Sabah announced that the GCC planned to create a replacement for the Peninsula Shield Force. He stated that "the GCC options would always be unified just as they were when leaders declared the establishment of a common market at the Doha Summit."

== Leadership and structure ==
As of March 2011, the Peninsula Shield Force was commanded by Saudi Major General Mutlaq bin Salem Al-Azima, had about 40,000 troops and continued to have its permanent base at King Khalid Military City near Hafar al Batin.

According to Peninsula Shield Force commander Al-Azima, any intervention by the force must include participation from all GCC member states.

== Use of the Peninsula Shield Force ==
=== 1990–1991 ===
The Peninsula Shield Force was not sufficiently developed to be deployed in defense of Kuwait ahead of the invasion and occupation of Kuwait by Iraq in August 1990. A force of about 3,000 men from the Peninsula Shield Force, in addition to forces of its member states, took part in the liberation of Kuwait in March 1991.

=== 2003 ===
10,000 troops and two ships of the Peninsula Shield Force were deployed to Kuwait in February 2003 ahead of the Iraq War to protect Kuwait from potential Iraqi attacks. It did not participate in operations against Iraq.

=== Role in Bahraini uprising ===
On 14 March 2011, the Bahraini government requested Peninsula Shield Forces enter Bahrain via the causeway from Saudi Arabia. Forces from Saudi Arabia and the UAE entered Bahrain, while Kuwait and Oman refrained from sending troops. The Bahraini uprising was the first GCC deployment in relation to an internal threat. In late March, Peninsula Shield Force commander al-Azima stated that the role of the force in Bahrain was to "secure Bahrain's vital and strategically important military infrastructure from any foreign interference" and to protect Bahraini borders while Bahrain security forces are "preoccupied with [Bahraini] internal security". He denied that the force caused any Bahraini citizen to "suffer so much as a scratch", and said that the force entered Bahrain "to bring goodness, peace, and love".

The 2011 Bahraini intervention involved about 10% of the Peninsula Shield Force. While some have argued that this was a Saudi attempt to block democratic processes taking hold, Bahraini officials argued that the Peninsula Shield Force was there to protect government facilities, rather than to intrude in the internal affairs of the country itself. In October 2011 the Peninsula Shield announced its intention to sue "several satellite TV channels for propagating lies and allegations about the Peninsula Shield forces that entered Bahrain". This followed persistent claims by these channels about the Gulf forces strafing demonstrators with warplanes and destroying mosques. The Peninsula Shield Force was "redeployed" but did not plan to fully withdraw from Bahrain.

Frequent Saudi Arabian street protests in and near Qatif in mid to late March, originally calling for political prisoners to be released, extended to opposition to the Peninsula Shield Force's presence in Bahrain.

=== American urging of closer defense ties ===
At the 2013 Manama Dialogue, U.S. defense secretary Chuck Hagel called for greater defense cooperation in the GCC, including bloc sales of American arms to the organization. Several days later, on 11 December 2013, the GCC announced the formation of a joint military command.

In 2016, Saudi Arabia held a military drill named "North Thunder" with a consortium of 20 countries to display its military cooperation with Arab countries. Pakistan, Djibouti, and other nations also contributed to the drill.

== See also ==
- Carter Doctrine
- Military of Bahrain
- Military of Kuwait
- Military of Oman
- Military of Qatar
- Military of Saudi Arabia
- Military of the United Arab Emirates
