= Specialized Criminal Court =

Non-Sharia court

The Specialized Criminal Court (SCC; Arabic: المحكمة الجزائية المتخصصة) is a non-Sharia court created in Saudi Arabia in 2008 that tries suspected terrorists and human rights activists. On 26 June 2011, the court started trials of 85 people suspected of being involved in Al-Qaeda in the Arabian Peninsula and the 2003 Riyadh compound bombings and in September 2011 another 41 al-Qaeda suspects appeared in the court. In the same year, the court held trial sessions of human rights activists, including co-founder Mohammed Saleh al-Bejadi of the Saudi Civil and Political Rights Association (ACPRA) and Mubarak Zu'air, a lawyer for long-term prisoners, and Khaled al-Johani, who spoke to BBC Arabic Television at a protest in Riyadh, thus becoming known as "the bravest man in Saudi Arabia". The court convicted 16 of the human rights activists to sentences of 5–30 years' imprisonment on 22 November 2011.

== Creation and legal status ==
The main part of the Saudi Arabian legal system consists of Sharia courts. As of 1992, the system allowed the creation of "specialized courts" for non-Sharia legal issues. The Specialized Criminal Court was created in 2008 for dealing with terrorist suspects.

== Al-Qaeda suspects ==
On 26 June 2011, the Specialized Criminal Court started hearing charges against 85 people including "possessing explosives, missiles, military weapons, and chemical materials and smuggling said items into the country for terrorist acts on behalf of al-Qaeda". The charges included involvement in the Riyadh compound bombings.

In September 2011, 38 Saudi citizens and three others suspected of being involved in al-Qaeda appeared in the Specialized Criminal Court on charges including "training in militant camps in Pakistan, fighting in Iraq [with] Abu Musab al-Zarqawi, financing terrorism, transporting weapons, forging documents, inciting militants to fight in Iraq and [harbouring] suspected [terrorists]".

An unnamed 45-year-old woman was tried in the Specialized Criminal Court starting on 31 July 2011. On 29 October 2011 she was sentenced to 15 years' imprisonment for "sheltering people wanted for security related matters and inciting terror acts in the kingdom, possessing two pistols [that she gave to militants] and financing terrorism and terror acts through collecting more than 1,000,000 Saudi riyals ... and sending the money to [al-Qaeda]." The woman denied the charges and said that she had been kidnapped by two al-Qaeda members with whom she had previously been married.

== Human rights activists and protestors ==
=== Imprisonments ===
Nine lawyers, academics and other people, including Dr Saud al-Hashimi and Dr Suliman al-Reshoudi, were arrested in February 2007 after trying to set up a human rights organization and starting a petition for political reform. Seven others were arrested for being linked to al-Hashimi. On 22 November 2011, the 16 were convicted in the Specialized Criminal Court of "forming a secret organization, attempting to seize power, incitement against the King, financing terrorism, and money laundering" and given sentences of 5–30 years, to be followed by travel bans. The men appealed their convictions on 22 January 2012. Amnesty International judged the trials to be "grossly unfair", said that there were "allegations of torture and other ill-treatment in pre-trial detention", and that "at least some of those sentenced are prisoners of conscience".

Saudi Civil and Political Rights Association (ACPRA) co-founder Mohammed Saleh al-Bejadi, arrested on 21 March 2011, appeared in the Specialized Criminal Court in August 2011 for "insurrection against the ruler, instigating demonstrations, and speaking with foreign [media] channels." Judge al-'Abd al-Latif prevented al-Bejadi's defence lawyers from attending the August trial session.

Mubarak Zu'air, a lawyer supporting long-term prisoners, was arrested on 20 March 2011, a day after an interview on the topic with Minister of Interior, Nayef, Crown Prince of Saudi Arabia. His first court appearance following the arrest was on 22 December 2011 in the Specialized Criminal Court, on charges of "encumbering the affairs of the ruler, not complying with rules and regulations, attending an unlicensed gathering, spreading sedition, and not obeying religious scholars". He was given no prior notice of the court hearing, so his defence lawyers were unable to attend the session.

Khaled al-Johani, a teacher of religious instruction in Riyadh was imprisoned, without a trial, for nearly one year at ʽUlaysha Prison for having publicly asked for freedoms and democracy in Saudi Arabia on the 11 March 2011 "Day of Rage" during the 2011–2012 Saudi Arabian protests. He made a public statement to a BBC Arabic Television team on a street in Riyadh in the presence of security forces. On 22 February 2012 he was charged in the Specialized Criminal Court with "support of demonstrations, presence at the location of a demonstration, and communications with the foreign media in a manner that harmed the reputation of the Kingdom of Saudi Arabia." A trial date was set for April 2012. Al-Johani is an Amnesty International prisoner of conscience as of February 2012.

=== Death penalties ===
Ali al-Nimr, who as a teenager participated in the Saudi Arabian protests, was arrested in 2012 after being hit and injured by a police car. He was tried and sentenced to death and appealed to the Specialized Criminal Court in 2014 and 2015. As of 8 October 2015, he awaited ratification of his sentence by King Salman of Saudi Arabia, to be carried out by crucifixion and beheading. Al-Nimr's trial was called unfair by United Nations expert Christof Heyns and Amnesty International, who called for the execution to be stopped, as did French President François Hollande and Prime Minister Manuel Valls.

In October 2015, the Specialized Criminal Court sentenced Dawoud al-Marhoon, who had been arrested as a 17-year-old in May 2012 during protests in the Eastern Province, to death by beheading. Al-Marhoon was tortured during his detention and was convicted on the basis of a forced confession.

Nimr al-Nimr, Ali al-Nimr's uncle, was sentenced to death by the Specialized Criminal Court and executed on 2 January 2016 together with forty-four other Saudis, an Egyptian and a Chadian.

== See also ==
- Legal system of Saudi Arabia
- Terrorism in Saudi Arabia
- Human rights in Saudi Arabia
