= Saudi Civil and Political Rights Association =

Saudi Civil and Political Rights Association (ACPRA)
- ACPRA logo
- Founded: 12 October 2009
- Founder: 11 co-founders
- Dissolved: 9 March 2013
- Location: Saudi Arabia
- Key people: Mohammad Fahad al-Qahtani (leader), Mohammed Saleh al-Bejadi (co-founder, arrested 21 March 2011)
- Website: acpra.org

The Saudi Civil and Political Rights Association (ACPRA) (Arabic: جمعية الحقوق المدنية والسياسية في السعودية, romanized: Jamʻīyat al-Ḥuqūq al-Madanīyah wa-al-Siyāsīyah fī al-Saʻūdīyah) is a Saudi Arabian human rights non-governmental organisation created in 2009. On 9 March 2013, the Saudi court sentenced two of its prominent leaders to at least 10 years in prison for "offences that included sedition and giving inaccurate information to foreign media", while dissolving the group. The association is also known in Arabic by its acronym HASEM.

== Creation ==
ACPRA was created in 2009 by 11 human rights activists and academics in response to what was seen as a worsening human rights situation in Saudi Arabia. The 11 founders are Professor Abdulkareem Yousef al-Khathar, Dr. Abdulrahman Hamid al-Hamid, Professor Abdullah H. al-Hamid, who is a former professor of comparative literature and founding member of the Committee for the Defense of Legitimate Rights, Fahad Abdulaziz Ali al-Orani, Fowzan Mohsen al-Harbi, Easa Hamid al-Hamid, Mhana Mohammed al-Faleh, Dr. Mohammad Fahad al-Qahtani, Mohammad Hamad al-Mohaisen, Mohammed Saleh al-Bejadi and Saud Ahmed al-Doughaither.

== Aims ==
It aims to promote human rights awareness, focussing on the 1948 United Nations Universal Declaration of Human Rights and related international human rights instruments, it calls for an elected parliament and the creation of legal institutions to support transparency and accountability. The ACPRA also calls for laws to protect minority rights and intends to document human rights violations.

== Structure and leadership ==
As of March 2011, the ACPRA was led by Mohammad Fahad al-Qahtani.

== Statements and reports ==
In January 2011, ACPRA and Human Rights First Society complained to King Abdullah about the torture of septuagenarian Judge Suliman al-Reshoudi, whose feet were chained to his bed each night and who was forced to sit up during the day. In late March 2011, ACPRA's leader, Mohammad Fahad Al-Qahtani, stated that he saw police detain about 50 out of 100 protestors at the Ministry of the Interior in Riyadh.

== Government responses ==
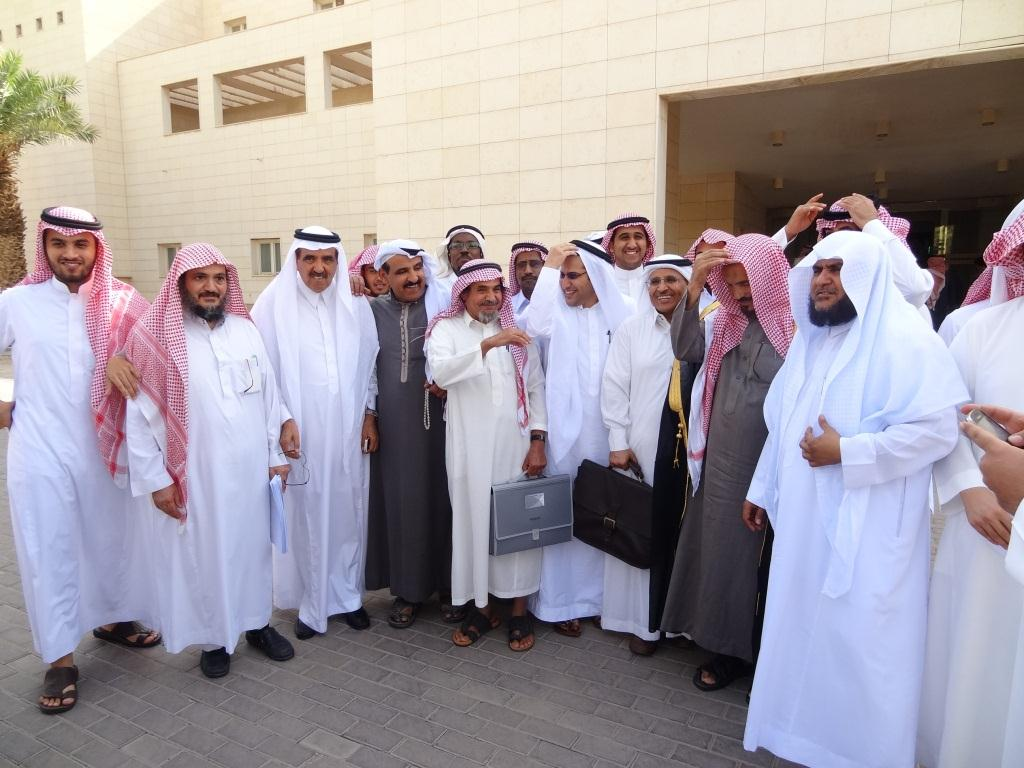
ACPRA members on trial in Riyadh in 2012

ACPRA co-founder Mohammed Saleh al-Bejadi (also al-Bjady) was arrested on 21 March 2011, during the 2011 Saudi Arabian protests, in Buraidah by Mabahith, the internal security agency. ACPRA stated that the arrest was arbitrary, in violation of the Basic Law of Saudi Arabia and the Law of Criminal Procedures. Al-Bejadi appeared in the Specialized Criminal Court in August 2011 on charges of "insurrection against the ruler, instigating demonstrations, and speaking with foreign [media] channels." Judge al-'Abd al-Latif prevented al-Bejadi's defence lawyers from attending the August trial session.

On 18 June 2012, ACPRA co-founder and leader Mohammad Fahad al-Qahtani was charged in a Saudi court for his human rights activities. On 29 June, the Cairo Institute for Human Rights Studies spoke on al-Qahtani's behalf at the 20th session of the United Nations Human Rights Council. Another ACPRA co-founder, Abdullah al-Hamid, was charged with similar offences on 11 June 2012.

== See also ==
- Abdulaziz al-Shubaily
- Abduaziz al Hussan
- Human rights in Saudi Arabia § Human rights organizations
  - ALQST
  - European Saudi Organisation for Human Rights
