= Qatif conflict =

Conflict in Saudi Arabia between Shias and Sunnis

- Part of the Iran–Saudi Arabia proxy war, Anti-Shia discrimination in Saudi Arabia, Arab Spring and the Shia–Sunni conflict
- Map of Saudi Arabia, with Eastern Province (including Qatif region) highlighted.
Date	26 November 1979 – present (46 years, 9 months, 1 week and 5 days)
Location	Qatif and Awamiyah, Eastern Province, Saudi Arabia
Status	Ongoing low-intensity conflict; violence ceased

Belligerents
(Saudi Arabia) Saudi Arabian Government; Ministry of National Guard; National Guard; Presidency of State Security; General Directorate of Investigations; Emergency Force; Ministry of Interior; General Directorate of Public Security	Shia militants (1979–1990s); Organization for the Islamic Revolution in the Arabian Peninsula (1979–91); Hezbollah Al-Hejaz (1987–present; mostly inactive since 1990s); Saudi Shia civilians

Casualties and losses
80+ killed 300+ wounded	350+ killed 760+ wounded Thousands arrested 182–219 killed (by 1983)
- 750+ civilians killed (activists' claim); Thousands of civilians displaced

The Qatif conflict is a modern phase of sectarian tensions and violence in Eastern Arabia between Arab Shia Muslims and the Arab Sunni majority, which has ruled Saudi Arabia since early 20th century. The conflict encompasses civil unrest which has been sporadically happened since the 1979 uprising, pro-democracy and pro-human rights protests and occasional armed incidents, which increased in 2017 as part of the 2017–20 Qatif unrest. Human Rights Watch sees the conflict as stemming from pervasive anti-Shia prejudice in Saudi Arabia, compounded by geopolitical rivalries in the region.

== Background ==
Since Al-Hasa and Qatif were conquered and annexed into the Emirate of Riyadh in 1913 by Ibn Saud, Shiites in the region had experienced state of oppression. Unlike most of Saudi Arabia, Qatif has a Shiite majority, and the region is also being of key importance to the Saudi government due to its closeness to the bulk of Saudi oil reserves as well as the main Saudi refinery and export terminal of Ras Tanura, which is situated close to Qatif.

== History ==
=== 1979 uprising ===
The 1979 Qatif Uprising was a period of unprecedented civil unrest that occurred in Qatif and Al-Hasa, Saudi Arabia, in late November 1979. The unrest resulted in 20-24 people killed in what was described as a sectarian outburst of violence between the Shi'a minority and Sunni majority in Saudi Arabia and the beginning of the modern phase of the Qatif conflict.

=== 1979–83 crackdown ===
After the 1979 uprising, the Saudi authorities have engaged in systematic persecution of Shi'a activists in Qatif, with an estimated 182-219 killed by 1983 (including the 1979 events).

=== Arab Spring protests 2011–12 ===
With the coincidence of the events of the Arab Spring in most Arab countries, especially in Bahrain, on February 17, hundreds of Shiites went out in Qatif to demand economic reforms in Qatif and Al-Ahsa, and to demand Shia rights in Saudi Arabia, and this continued until 2012, and 20 Shiite demonstrators and 4 security forces were killed. And 952 people were arrested, then 735 people were released

The protests in Saudi Arabia were part of the Arab Spring that started with the 2011 Tunisian revolution. Protests started with a self-immolation in Samtah and Jeddah street protests in late January 2011. Protests against anti-Shia discrimination followed in February and early March in Qatif, Hofuf, al-Awamiyah, and Riyadh. A Facebook organiser of a planned 11 March "Day of Rage", Faisal Ahmed Abdul-Ahad, was allegedly killed by Saudi security forces on 2 March, with several hundred people protesting in Qatif, Hofuf and al-Amawiyah on the day itself. Khaled al-Johani demonstrated alone in Riyadh, was interviewed by BBC News Arabic, was detained in ʽUlaysha Prison, and became known online as "the only brave man in Saudi Arabia". Many protests over human rights took place in April 2011 in front of government ministry buildings in Riyadh, Taif and Tabuk and in January 2012 in Riyadh. In 2011, Nimr al-Nimr encouraged his supporters in nonviolent resistance.

=== Execution controversy of Nimr al-Nimr ===
On 15 October 2014, al-Nimr was sentenced to death by the Specialized Criminal Court for "seeking 'foreign meddling' in [Saudi Arabia], 'disobeying' its rulers and taking up arms against the security forces". Said Boumedouha of Amnesty International stated that the death sentence was "part of a campaign by the authorities in Saudi Arabia to crush all dissent, including those defending the rights of the Kingdom's Shi'a Muslim community."

Nimr al-Nimr's brother, Mohammad al-Nimr, tweeted information about the death sentence and was arrested on the same day.

The head of Iran's armed forces warned Saudi Arabia that it would "pay dearly" if it carried out the execution.

In March 2015 the Saudi Arabian appellate court upheld the death sentence against al-Nimr.

On 25 October 2015, the Supreme Religious Court of Saudi Arabia rejected al-Nimr's appeal against his death sentence. During an interview for Reuters, al-Nimr's brother claimed that the decision was a result of a hearing which occurred without the presence or notification of al-Nimr's lawyers and family. This being said, he still remained hopeful that King Salman would grant a pardon. However, on January 2, 2016, al-Nimr was executed.

=== Unrest (2017–2020) ===
The 2017–2020 Qatif unrest occurred in the Qatif region (within Eastern Province of Saudi Arabia) between the Saudi government and the Shia militants until it died down in 2020. It began in May 2017 after an incident on 12 May when a child and a Pakistani young man were shot and killed. In the same month, Saudi authorities erected siege barricades in Al-Awamiyah and attempted to bulldoze the al-Musawara residential area. The conflict became an armed conflict, with about 12–25 people killed in shelling and sniper fire during May and the following few months.

On 11 May 2019, 8 militants were killed in a firefight with Saudi security forces in the Sanabis neighborhood of Qatif.

On 7 January 2020, The "most dangerous wanted terrorist" in Qatif was captured after he fired on a security patrol, according to state-run news media effectively ending the 2017–2020 Qatif unrest|2017–20 Qatif unrest.

=== Demonstrations (2022) ===
On 14 March 2022, thousands of Shi'ite protestors took to streets after the executions of several Shi'ites in alleged unfair trials.

== See also ==
- List of modern conflicts in the Middle East
- insurgency in Bahrain
- Iran–Saudi Arabia proxy war
