= Sectarianism in Saudi Arabia =

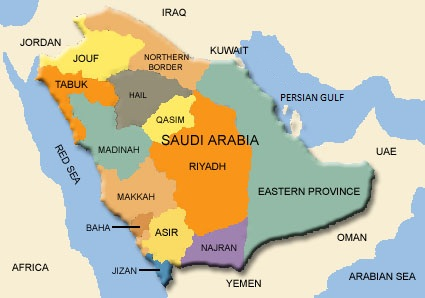
2011 map of Saudi Arabia detailing key cities

Sectarianism in Saudi Arabia refers to the Saudi government's "top-down push towards sectarian polarization" between the Sunni majority, and Shi'ite minority. This encompasses anti-Shi'ite policies by the Saudi regime, as well as tensions between the Sunni majority and the Shi'ite minority. The Saudi government is often viewed to be oppressing the Shi'ite community, who constitute up to 15% of the Saudi population. This occurs against the backdrop of the broader Iran-Saudi Arabia proxy conflict, since Iran is a Shi'ite republic.

According to international politics scholar Ric Neo, "there is a long history of persecution of Shi'a Muslims and they continue to face an unprecedented extent of religious, economic and sociopolitical marginalisation". Human Rights Watch observe that Shi'ites "face systematic discrimination in religion, education, justice, and employment". For example, Shi'ites lack legal representation: there are only three Shi'ite judges serving in the Shi'ite courts of the Eastern Province, and their jurisdiction is confined entirely to family law.

In the classroom, curricula predominantly neglects Shi'ite history, with some texts employing derogatory terms towards Shi'ites. In the past, Shi'ites have been depicted as "examples of ahl al-bida' 'innovators' who deviate from Islam". In 2017, Human Rights Watch reported that Saudi school textbooks often use "veiled language to stigmatize Shia religious practices as shirk, or polytheism or ghulah, “exaggeration”".

In matters of employment, Shi'ites are often not considered for public sector jobs, and are likely to be paid less than their Sunni co-workers, even if more qualified. Despite working in the oil-rich industries of the Eastern Province, Shi'ites mainly work in "menial and low-wage positions" and lack access to wealthier occupations. At the workplace, Shi'ites face further discrimination and are unable to practice their religion.

Tensions date back to the establishment of Wahhabism, and the coalition that the House of Saud formed with the Wahhabis in 1744. Friction increased following the 1960s; despite undergoing détente in the 1990s, tensions rose with the 2003 US-led invasion of Iraq and escalated after domestic protests during the early 2010s Arab Spring.

== Background: 1744–1960s ==
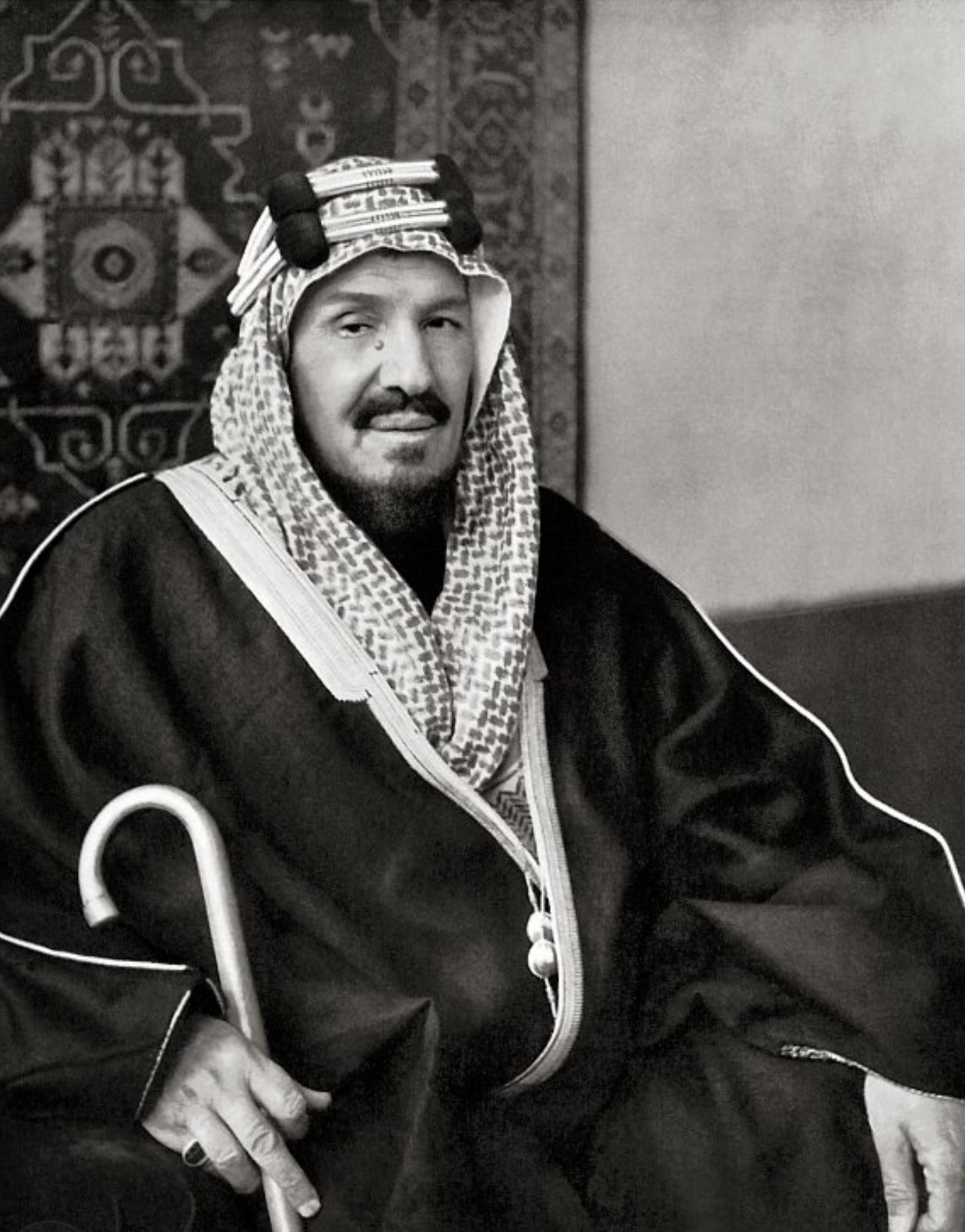
Abdulaziz bin Abdul Rahman Al Saud (also known as Ibn Saud), founder of Saudi Arabia, reigned 1932-1953

Wahhabism is a branch of Sunni-Salafi thought. As a result of its policies, Wahhabism is viewed to be completely intolerant of Shi'ism, since Wahhabism seeks to restore Islam to its purest form observed in the lifetime of the Islamic prophet Muhammad. In 1744, the House of Saud formed a coalition with the Wahhabis. This alliance continues to this day; Wahhabi ulamas support al-Saud's political power, imbuing the Saudi regime with Islamic legitimacy. Islamic legitimacy is seen as central to Saudi authority, given its position as the guardian of the two holiest sites in Islam: Makkah and Madinah. To compound its Sunni prestige, the Saudi state became "the de facto bastion of anti-Shi’ism dogma within the Islamic world," treating Shi'ism as heresy.

After 1744, the Wahhabis "mounted a jihad which involved demolishing tombs, shrines, and even grave markers, and cleansing Islam of Shiaism since its excessive reverence for Muhammad's family was deemed to be verging on idolatry". Furthermore, in 1802, Abdul Aziz bin Muhammad bin Saud sacked the Shi'ite holy site of Karbala, which saw the death of approximately 5000 Shi'ites. In 1913, Ibn Saud captured Al-Ahsa in the Eastern Province - home to many Shi'ites - and formally annexed the region into the Emirate of Nejd and Hasa. Ibn Saud allowed Shi'ites to have their own separate judicial courts for religious and family law cases. Some of Ibn Saud's followers pressured him to impose harsher measures against the Shi'ites. Ibn Saud initially did not act on this, and instead prioritised gaining new territory to expand the Emirate of Nejd and Hasa.

In 1925, however, following the capture of Hejaz, Ibn Saud continued the demolition of Shi'ite tombs. Even so, after securing his political rule, Ibn Saud opted for a quiet policy of partial coexistence, allowing some Shi'ites to run their own mosques. Nonetheless, anti-Shi'ite rhetoric prevailed into state institutions. In 1927, Wahhabi ulamas issued a fatwa (ruling) calling upon Shi'ites to convert to Sunni Islam. Across the Kingdom, many Shi'ite institutions were closed down, including mosques and community centres, whilst the commemoration of Ashura was prohibited. Publishing and distributing Shi'ite religious texts was further outlawed, alongside the Shi'ite call to prayer.

Two events later brought tensions to the forefront: the rise of Gamal Abdel Nasser's Pan-Arabism and the Iranian Revolution of 1979, which established the Shi'ite Islamic Republic of Iran.

== Impact of Pan-Arabism ==
The rise of Nasser deeply concerned Islamic monarchies in the Middle East. Nasser called for the creation of a Pan-Arab state, advocating republicanism, and condemning monarchist regimes like the House of Saud. Indeed, Nasser stated that he would "ensure that Faisal be Saudi Arabia’s last king". To counter Pan-Arabism and offset Nasser's influence, Saudi Arabia leaned towards Pan-Islamism. Pan-Islamism sought to "legitimise the monarchy’s continued existence and entwine it ever more closely with Sunni-Islam and the ultra-conservative Wahhabism". Following the defeat of Nasser's forces in the 1967 Arab-Israeli War, Pan-Arabism lost its momentum. Many Arabs became disillusioned with the concept, allowing for Pan-Islamism to subsume its place. According to Neo, the rise of Pan-Islamism attempted to normalise Sunni Islam and Wahhabism, and exacerbated divisions between Saudi's Sunni majority and Shi'ite minority. In sum, Pan-Islamist discourse led to a more pronounced Sunni-Shi'ite narrative.

In the meanwhile, Shi'ite scholar Hassan al-Saffar began to call for reforms, and founded the Shi'ite Reform Movement in 1975. Al-Saffar sought to extract reform which would address the religious, social, and economic conditions of Shi'ites in the Saudi Kingdom, calling for improved living conditions and the right to practice more openly.

== The Iranian Revolution and the violence of 1979 ==
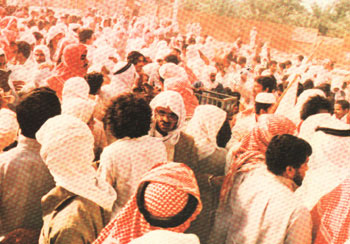
Demonstrators in Safwa City, Qatif during the 1979 Qatif Uprising

The 1979 Revolution saw the installation of Ruhollah Khomeini also known as Ayatollah Khomeini. The secular regime of Reza Shah Pehlavi was deposed, and Khomeini was instituted as the Supreme Leader, formally establishing the Islamic Republic. Khomeini's ascendancy created a variety of concerns for the House of Saud. Khomeini called for regimes like the House of Saud to be overthrown, and by consolidating Iran as a Shi'ite republic, the Sunni-Shi'ite narrative that Pan-Islamism gave rise to was "set in stone," igniting sectarian hostilities amongst Saudi Sunnis and Saudi Shi'ites.

Back in Saudi Arabia, the Shi'ites across Al-Ahsa and Qatif remained economically and socially excluded from the "common Saudi experience" owing to their affiliations with Shi'ite Islam. According to historian Joshua Teitalbaum, the Shi'ites of these regions "reject the official narrative of Saudi history" which portrays the annexation of these regions "as a mythological “unification” of the Arabian Peninsula". Teitalbaum elaborates that many Shi'ites viewed Saudi rule in Al-Ahsa and Qatif as an occupation.

Thus the 1979 Iranian Revolution and the overthrow of Shah Pehlavi mobilised the Shi'ites to secure equal treatment as their Sunni counterparts, ending their economic and social exclusion from the state. The Shi'ites in Qatif were most moved by this, and were additionally frustrated with their poor working conditions and wages in the oil industry. Breaking with Saudi policy, on March 25, 1979, the Shi'ites publicly celebrated Ashura. On March 28, they congregated to protest the regime. Violence erupted between the Shi'ites and the Sunni majority, culminating into the 1979 Qatif Uprising. The Saudi Arabian National Guard harshly suppressed the uprising, which saw the death of 20-24 Shi'ites.

In response to the violence, al-Saffar's Reform Movement had morphed into the more radical Organization for the Islamic Revolution in the Arabian Peninsula (OIRAP). Tensions between OIRAP and the Saudi government increased in 1987 after the Makkah incident.

== Aftermath of the 1987 Makkah Incident ==
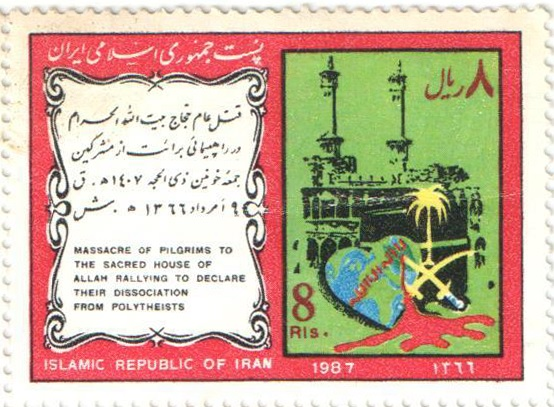
A 1987 Iranian postage stamp memorialising that year's Makkah incident and its casualties

Following the Qatif uprising, the Saudi government granted some concessions to its Shi'ite population. Relations between the Sunni majority and the Shi'ite minority were mostly calm, despite the backdrop of the 1980-88 Iran-Iraq War. The events of 1987 shifted this, following the unrest in Makkah. Clashes between Iranian Shi'ites and Saudi Arabian security forces during the annual pilgrimage of Hajj left at least 400 dead, though official statistics remain disputed. In response, the Saudi government increased official pressure on the Shi'ite community, prompting al-Saffar to move OIRAP's headquarters from Tehran to Damascus.

Despite working from Syria, al-Saffar continued to smuggle anti-Saudi pamphlets into the Eastern Province. Once the tensions from 1987 had boiled over, relations between Saudi Arabia and Iran improved. Sunni-Shi'ite relations improved in tandem with this, helping to usher in a détente which again changed the nature of OIRAP's operations.

== Détente: 1990 – early 2000s ==
Following Iraqi president Saddam Hussein's invasion of Kuwait in 1990, OIRAP shifted its tone considerably. Fearing Saddam's invasion of Saudi Arabia, "Saffar called on his followers to rally behind the government to fight Saddam’s regime. Many Saudi Shias volunteered to join the army and the civil defence force". OIRAP was dissolved, instead becoming the Reformative Movement in the Arabian Peninsula in 1991. This new Reform Movement called for peaceful reform and democracy, using petitions first and foremost to improve the status of Saudi Shi'ites and their working conditions and salaries within the oil sector. Relations between the regime and the Shi'ites became more accommodating. In 1993 King Fahd agreed to "release 400 Shias held as political prisoners and allow 1,200 to 1,500 others to return to the Kingdom". The Reform Movement formally dissolved, as a result of its negotiations with King Fahd. A particularly significant development occurred when the Saudi regime referred to Shi'ism as a heterodox sect in a reissued school text, recognising Shi'ite Islam as having its own school of jurisprudence.

Despite the détente, the Saudi regime's accommodation of Shi'ites angered some radical Sunni fundamentalists in the Kingdom, who continued to voice their intolerance of Shi'ites. Shaykh Nasir Sulayman al-‘Umar, for example, branded the Shi'ites as "liars and untrustworthy" in his 1993 publication Waqi‘ al-Rafidah fi Bilad al-Tawhid (The Reality of the Rafidah in the Land of Tawhid). Furthermore, "not all Shiites accepted the new accommodation with the regime, and some members of the overseas opposition did not return".

Following the September 11 attacks, the Saudi regime opened up dialogue for reform within the Kingdom. After the fall of Saddam in 2003, liberal Sunni Islamists joined forces with Saudi Shi'ites to issue the petition "Vision for the Homeland". More and more Shi'ites called for fairer legal representation, and their own distinct religious courts since Sunni courts do not recognise testimonies by Shi'ites. The start of the new century initially saw a continuation of détente, but later faced limitations.

== 2005–2011 ==
In 2005, national elections were held across Saudi Arabia for municipal councils. King Abdullah of Saudi Arabia allowed the Shi'ites to participate in this elections; the Shi'ites won nearly all the seats they contested. However, these seats faced restrictions. Half the council seats were contested, while the other half were appointed by the Saudi government. Furthermore, the seats had limited power since the municipal councils could only act on municipal issues, as opposed to broader urban or city concerns.

Regional developments went some way to impact domestic tensions. The fall of Saddam Hussein paved the way for the rise of Shi'ism in Iraq. This increased the friction between Saudi Sunnis and Saudi Shi'ites, as Wahhabi figures feared the broader rise of Shi'ism. In Lebanon, the 2006 War and the activities of the Shi'ite Hezbollah exacerbated this fear. Wahhabi figures like Shaykh Abdullah Ibn Jibreen accused and cast the Shi'ites as "evil in nature". In January 2007, Ibn Jibreen issued a fatwa calling Shi'ites mushrikin (polytheists) and Sunnis the "true Muslims".

In February 2009, the Islamic religious police harassed nearly 1000 Shi'ite citizens en route for pilgrimage in Medina; reports allege that the police further recorded the veiled women on pilgrimage, despite etiquette regarding modesty. A 15-year-old Shi'ite pilgrim was shot by the police when clashes erupted, and a Shi'ite shaykh was stabbed by an unknown civilian shouting "kill the rejectionist!". Protests erupted across the Eastern Province in response to the clashes, led by the Shi'ite community.

The treatment of Shi'ites continued to deteriorate. After the municipal councils scheduled for 2009 were postponed, Shi'ites became "disillusioned with unfulfilled regime promises" made in détente which failed to sustain the improved rights of the Shi'ite population. The Arab Spring would resonate with these Shi'ites, with protests later erupting with increased fervour.

== Arab Spring – present day ==
The Arab Spring gave momentum to demonstrations in Saudi Arabia; in 2011, protests across the Eastern Province increased in intensity. At least 16 Shi'ites were killed in these demonstrations. Whilst protests in the Arab Spring employed the phrase, "ash-shaʻb yurīd isqāṭ an-niẓām" ('the people want the downfall of the regime'), the demonstrations in the Eastern Province were initially moderate in comparison. Some placards read "we do not plan to overthrow the regime". Instead, Shi'ites demonstrated for reform, seeking to improve their status and rights under the Saudi regime.

By 2012, the tone of these protests became more aggressive, with slogans calling for the death of Minister of Interior, Nayef bin Abdulaziz for his anti-Shi'ite policies and rhetoric. Shi'ite Shaykh Nimr al-Nimr had been involved in encouraging demonstrations. In 2011, al-Nimr called for protests to remain peaceful, stating that "the weapon of the word is stronger than bullets". As protests continued, al-Nimr became the movement's "figurehead". On 8 July 2012, while protesting at Al-Awamiyah, al-Nimr was shot in the leg and arrested by the police. Protests subsequently intensified, but were eventually suppressed by Saudi forces towards the end of August, 2012. In response to the uprising, the Saudi government did go some way to grant concessions. The regime spent $130 billion to increase salaries, develop housing, fund religious organisations and boost infrastructure, "effectively neutralizing most opposition".

Despite the reforms, in 2015, a new decree was passed further restricting the Shi'ite courts' authority and limiting the legal representation of Shi'ites. The decree granted Sunni courts with the power to override the Shi'ite courts' judgements.

In January 2016, the Saudi government executed al-Nimr, angering many Shi'ites and drawing criticisms by various human rights organisations worldwide, including Amnesty International. In December 2020, the government called for the demolition of the mosque where al-Nimr used to lead prayers and deliver sermons.

In 2017, tensions once again broke out between the Saudi security forces and the Shi'ite residents of Qatif, culminating into the 2017–2020 Qatif unrest. This period of unrest refers to a series of skirmishes, which saw the destruction of entire residential areas in Al-Awamiyah. In July 2017, 4 Shi'ite men were sentenced to death for clashing with security forces in the region.

In September 2017, Human Rights Watch reviewed Saudi's education curriculum and found that the Shi'ite "practice of visiting graves and religious shrines to venerate important religious figures and members of the family of the prophet, as well as tawassul," was stigmatised as "grounds for removal from Islam and incur the punishment of being sent to hell for eternity". The review concluded that "government textbooks perpetuate an anti-Shia narrative in Saudi society that serves to incite hatred against Shia citizens and maintain a system of discrimination against them."

Responding to this in an interview with The Atlantic, conducted in 2018, Crown Prince Muhammad bin Salman stated that "the Shiites are living normally in Saudi Arabia. We have no problem with the Shiites". According to Human Rights Watch however, the Crown Prince's reforms "did not remove all anti-Shia rhetoric in textbooks, especially at the secondary school level," as some texts continue to refer to Shi'ites as rafidha, or rejectionists. As of February 2021, Human Rights Watch maintain that "Saudi Arabia has taken important steps to purge its school religion textbooks of hateful and intolerant language, but the current texts maintain language that disparages practices associated with religious minorities".

In 2019, the Saudi regime executed 37 men, charged by the state on convictions of terrorism, accused of colluding with Iran; a majority of these men were Shi'ites from the Eastern Province who criticised the policies of the Saudi regime. As of 2020, the government refuses to return the bodies of these men to their families.

== See also ==
- Iran–Saudi Arabia proxy conflict
- Shia Islam in Saudi Arabia
- Anti-Shi'ism
- Sectarianism
