= Al-Haraka al-Islahiya al-Islamiya =

Al-Haraka al-Islahiya al-Islamiya or Movement for Islamic Reform (Arabic: حركة الإصلاح الإسلامي, romanized: al-Haraka al-Islahiya al-Islamiya, lit. 'Reform Movement') is a Shi'i protest group in Saudi Arabia active in the 1980s and 1990s. Vali Nasr includes the group as part of the "Shia revival" following the 1979 Iranian Revolution. According to Robert G. Rabil, it was led by Sheikh Hassan al-Saffar who changed the name of his group to al-Haraka al-Islahiya in the 1990s. In 1993, Shia dissidents in Saudi (if not al-Haraka al-Islahiya itself) gained some improvements in their conditions, under reforms by King Abdullah, but this "came to a screeching halt" in 2011 with the Arab Spring.

== See also ==
- Shia–Sunni relations
- Shia Islam in Saudi Arabia
