= Shia Islam in Saudi Arabia =

Religious and ethnic minority in Saudi Arabia

Shia Muslims
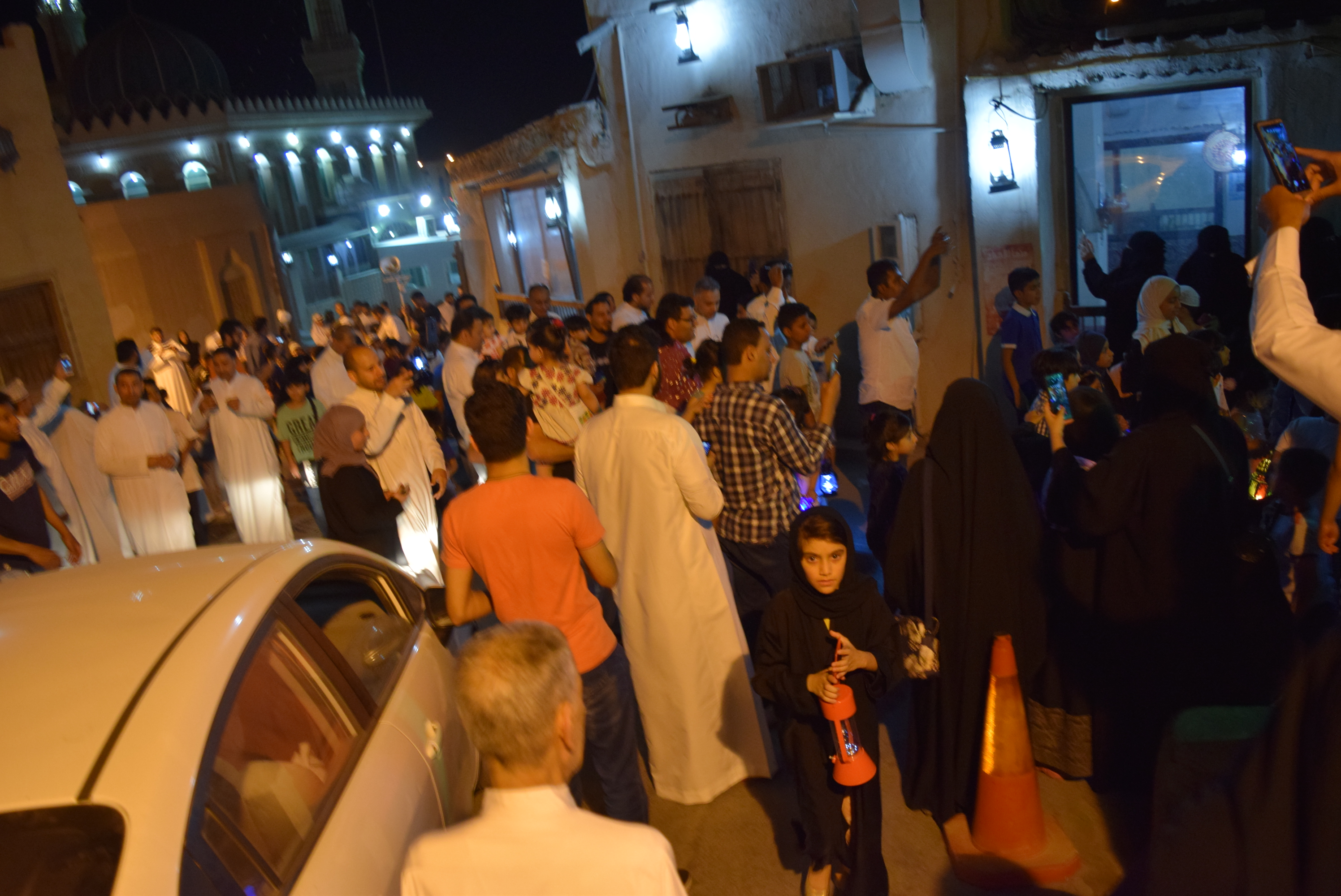

Total population
- 10–15% of Saudi Arabia's population

Languages
- Arabic (Bahrani, Gulf, Hejazi, Modern Standard, Najdi)

Religion
- Shia Islam

Related ethnic groups
- Bahrainis

The Saudi government does not conduct a census on religion or ethnicity, but some sources estimate the Shia population in Saudi Arabia to make up around 10-15% of the approximately 20 million natives of Saudi Arabia.

Saudi Arabia's Twelver Shia community, the Baharna, is primarily concentrated in the country's Eastern Province, chiefly Qatif and Al-Ahsa. A Twelver Shia community also exists in Medina known as the Nakhawila. Similarly, a tribal Shia community also exists in the Hijaz region, manifesting itself in three tribes: the Banu Husayn (Al Hussaini), the sharifs of Mecca who ruled for more than five centuries, along with two traditionally nomadic Hijazi tribes of Harb and Juhaynah. A few historians believe that these Bedouin tribes belonged to a strain of Shia Islam that is neither Twelver nor Zaydi, with some believing that they profess neo-Kaysanite beliefs. Outside of the eastern province and Hejaz, Shia Islam exists in the southern region of the kingdom, with Najran and its Yam tribe being traditionally Sulaymani Ismaili. Zaydism also exists in the regions bordering northern Yemen. The U.S. Department of State estimated in 2016 that around 700,000 Ismailis inhabit the region of Najran, while around 20,000 Zaydis are also concentrated in the regions bordering Yemen.

Shias in Saudi Arabia face numerous institutional challenges. The modern Kingdom of Saudi Arabia was formed in 1932 by the House of Saud, who are followers of a movement within Sunni Islam known as Wahhabism. Followers of the Wahhabite mission—who dominate religious institutions, courts and education of the kingdom, believe that "Muslims who seek intercession from holy men, such as the imams revered by Shiites, are not 'true' Muslims."

== History ==
While Saudi Arabia has existed only since 1932, an earlier Al Saud state (Emirate of Diriyah) clashed with Shiites. Muhammad ibn Abd al-Wahhab believed that Shiites "imported into Islam" the practice of building mosques on graves, a practice he considered un-Islamic. He referred to the Shiites as Rafida (rejecters), a sectarian name his followers have continued to use.

In 1802, the Saud-Wahhabi alliance waged jihad (or at least qital, i.e. war) on the Shiite holy city of Karbala. There, according to a Wahhabi chronicler ʿUthman bin ʿAbdullah bin Bishr:

Muslims [Wahhabis referred to themselves as Muslims, not believing Shiites to be Muslims] scaled the walls, entered the city ... and killed the majority of its people in the markets and in their homes. [They] destroyed the dome placed over the grave of al-Husayn [and took] whatever they found inside the dome and its surroundings ... the grille surrounding the tomb which was encrusted with emeralds, rubies, and other jewels ... different types of property, weapons, clothing, carpets, gold, silver, precious copies of the Qur'an.

Al-Hasa, the main Shiite area of what is now Saudi Arabia, was conquered by Saudi forces in 1913. The initial treatment of Shiites was harsh, with religious leaders compelled to vow to "cease observance of their religious holidays, to shut down their special places of worship and to stop pilgrimages to holy sites in Iraq". Wahhabi ulema also "ordered the demolition of several Shiite mosques" and took "over teaching and preaching duties at the remaining mosques in order to convert the population".

Saudi authorities have acted on Wahhabi desires to eliminate "vestiges of Shia religiosity" in and around Medina. In 1926, the Al-Baqi' mausoleum, which included the tombs of Muhammad's family and his companions, second, fourth, fifth, and six Shiite Imams, was destroyed by Ibn Saud. In 1975, the tomb of a Shiite imam (Ismail ibn Ja'far al-Sadiq) was reportedly destroyed, and a year later an ancient palm tree that legend had it had been planted under the direction of Muhammad, and visited by Shiite and Sunni pilgrims for generations, was cut down on orders of a high ranking Wahhabi sheikh.

In 1979, the Iranian Islamic Revolution overthrew the Shah of Iran, replacing a pro-Western monarchy with an anti-Western theocratic Islamic republic. Iran is more populous than Saudi Arabia and its borders are relatively close to the latter's oil fields—which is also where most Shiites who are ethnic Baharna have traditionally lived. The Iranian scholars were eager to export their revolution, and ideologically opposed to both monarchical systems of government and any state allied with the West. Leaflets, radio broadcasts and tape cassettes from Iran targeted the Baharna and the other Shiites and attacked the Saudi government for corruption and hypocrisy. That November, Shiites commemorated Ashura (illegally) for the first time in many years. The following February, demonstrations were held on the one year anniversary of Ayatollah Khomeini's return to Iran. Saudi officials responded with both "sticks and carrots", arresting activists but also promising more schools, hospitals and infrastructure for the Shia region.

In 1987, following the deaths of over 300 during a demonstration by Iranian pilgrims in Mecca during the Hajj pilgrimage, Khomeini "denounced the House of Saud as 'murderers' and called on all loyal Shiites in the Kingdom to rise up and overthrow them", further alarming Saudi officials. After oil pipelines were bombed in 1988, the Saudi government accused Shiites of sabotage executed several. In collective punishment restrictions were placed on their freedoms and they were further marginalized economically. Wahhabi ulama were given the green light to sanction violence against Shia. Fatwas were passed by the country's leading cleric, Abdul-Aziz ibn Baz, denouncing Shia as apostates from Islam. (Note: In the 1990s, leading Wahhabi clerics like Ibn Baz and Abd Allah ibn Jibrin reiterated the customary view that Shia were infidels.)

After the 1991 Gulf War ended, weakening Iran's enemy Saddam Hussein and exhibiting the strength of Saudi ally the United States, "there was a noticeable thaw in relations between the two countries". In 1993, the Saudi government announced a general amnesty resulting in various Shiite leaders being released from jail or returning from exile. "Hundreds of young [Shiites]" were provided with jobs in the governmental and private sectors. The anti-Shiite Imam of the Prophet's Mosque in Medina was even sacked after he attacked Shiism in a Friday sermon in the presence of Iranian president Akbar Hashemi Rafsanjani.

In 2003, the political direction turned again, and a series of "National Dialogues" were initiated that included Shiites (as well as Sufis, liberal reformers, and professional women), to the strong disapproval of Wahhabi purists. In late 2003, "450 Shia academics, businessmen, writers, and women" presented a petition to Crown Prince Abdullah demanding a greater rights including the right for Shia to be referred to "their own religious courts as Sunni courts do not recognize testimonies by Shia".

As of 2006, more militant Saudi Wahhabi clerics were circulating a petition calling for an intensification of sectarian violence against Shiites, while the official religious establishment was calling for them to renounce their "fallacious" beliefs voluntarily and embrace "the right path" of Islam, rather than be killed, expelled, or converted by violence.

== Community structure, political and religious authority ==
In modern-day Saudi Arabia, the Sunni rulers limit Shiite political participation to "notables", according to scholar Vali Nasr. These notables benefit from their ties to power, and in return are expected to control their community. Much political activity takes place outside these parameters. Since 1979, hundreds of Saudi Shiites have been jailed, executed, and exiled.

=== Opposition ===
According to Ondrej Beranek of Brandeis University, Shiite opposition in Saudi Arabia has "undergone various stages of development". Saudi Shiites found Ayatollah Khomeini and the Iranian Revolution a "political inspiration", but an "important ideological source" was the organization Harakat al-risaliyin al-tala'i' (literally "the Movement of Vanguards' Missionaries"), established in 1968 not in Iran but in the Iraqi city of Karbala under the auspices of marja' al-taqlid (religious authority) Sayyid Muhammad Mahdi al-Shirazi. Other organizations include Munazzamat al-thawra 'l-islamiyya (Organization of Islamic Revolution), established after the Intifada of 1979. Focusing on peaceful change it changed its name to al-Haraka al-islahiyya (Reform Movement).

In response to this change, King Fahd met several of al-Saffar's followers and in October 1993 a pact was signed. Fahd promised to work towards improving conditions for Shia in Saudi Arabia, ordering the elimination of derogatory terms for them from textbooks, removing certain other forms of explicit discrimination, allowing many Shiite exiles to return to Saudi Arabia, and other acts. In return, al-Haraka 'l-islahiyya was dissolved and its members formally agreed to dissociate themselves from foreign groups and movements.

As of 2009, the main spokesman and representative of the Saudi Shiite movement in its more moderate incarnation has been Sheikh Hassan al-Saffar (b. 1958). Al-Saffar represents one of the few voices publicly calling for moderate, pragmatic action, tolerance and reconciliation between Shiites and Sunnis, and a political system based on civil society, free elections and freedom of speech.

At the other end of the Shiite political spectrum is the Saudi Hizballah or Hezbollah Al-Hejaz. Established in 1987, it supports the overthrow of the absolute monarchy. In 1988 and 1989, Saudi Hizballah led a couple of attacks on oil infrastructure and also murdered Saudi diplomats in Ankara, Bangkok, and Karachi. They were also allegedly involved in 1996 Khobar Towers bombing which killed dozens of US army personnel. Some of its members went through training in Iran. The group also is thought to use Iranian training camps in the Biqa' valley in Lebanon. The group throughout the 1980s and 1990s became notorious for killing Saudi police and army personnel, Wahhabi preachers, people from the interior ministry and intelligence as well as conducting specialized attacks on Aramco facilities and the Saudi naval forces. During the late 1990s however, the insurgency abruptly stopped as the Saudi government tired by the carnage and constant defeat of its forces to terminate the insurgency committed itself to genuine reforms. These reforms were brokered with Iraqi Shia scholars of the al-Badr organization.

In addition to these two factions, there are also smaller groups of traditionalists who look at the Saudi regime with suspicion and do not intend to become part of any reconciliation talks.

Following the 9/11 attacks and 2003 Riyadh compound bombings, Saudi Arabia seemed determined to stop the brutal campaign against its Shiite community, which in previous decades had resulted in hundreds of Shiites being jailed, executed, and exiled. Such a liberal move, however, could easily be understood as merely part of a new campaign aimed at improving the image of Saudi Arabia in the West.

== Restrictions and persecutions ==
The Saudi government has often been viewed as an active oppressor of Shiites because of the funding of the Wahhabi ideology which denounces the Shiite faith.

In 1988 fatwas passed by the country's leading cleric, Abdul-Aziz ibn Baz denounced the Shiites as apostates. Abdul-Rahman al-Jibrin, a member of the Higher Council of Ulama, sanctioned the killing of Shiites in 1994. According to Vali Nasr, this was still be reiterated in Wahhabi religious literature as late as 2002. By 2007 al-Jibrin wrote that [Shiites] "are the most vicious enemy of Muslims, who should be wary of their plots"

According to a 2009 Human Rights Watch report, Shiite citizens in Saudi Arabia "face systematic discrimination in religion, education, justice, and employment".

Saudi Arabia has no Shiite cabinet ministers, mayors or police chiefs, according to another source, Vali Nasr, unlike other countries with sizable Shiite populations (such as Iraq and Lebanon). Shiites are kept out of "critical jobs" in the armed forces and the security services, and not one of the three hundred Shiite girls schools in the Eastern Province has a Shiite principal.

Pakistani columnist Mohammad Taqi has written that "the Saudi regime is also acutely aware that, in the final analysis, Shiite grievances ... stem from socioeconomic deprivation, as a result of religious repression and political marginalization bordering on apartheid."

Testifying before the US Congressional Human Rights Caucus, Ali al-Ahmed, Director of the Institute for Gulf Affairs, stated

Saudi Arabia is a glaring example of religious apartheid. The religious institutions from government clerics to judges, to religious curriculums, and all religious instructions in media are restricted to the Wahhabi understanding of Islam, adhered to by less than 40% of the population. The Saudi government communized Islam, through its monopoly of both religious thoughts and practice. Wahhabi Islam is imposed and enforced on all Saudis regardless of their religious orientations. The Wahhabi sect does not tolerate other religious or ideological beliefs, Muslim or not. Religious symbols by Muslims, Christians, Jewish and other believers are all banned. The Saudi embassy in Washington is a living example of religious apartheid. In its 50 years, there has not been a single non-Sunni Muslim diplomat in the embassy. The branch of Imam Mohamed Bin Saud University in Fairfax, Virginia instructs its students that Shia Islam is a Jewish conspiracy.

In November 2014 at al-Dalwah village in the eastern province of al-Ahsa, three unknown masked gunmen opened fire at a Husseiniya, or Shi'ite religious center, killing eight and injuring a dozens.

While Saudi citizen circles blamed the Khawarij for the attack, claiming they wanted to start a civil war, a handful of articles in the Saudi press argued that the attack "had not come out of nowhere", that there was anti-Shi'ite incitement in the kingdom on the part of "the religious establishment, preachers, and even university lecturers – and that it was on the rise". The Saudi government/religious establishment, as well as the National media did not comment on the attack.

In January 2016, Saudi Arabia executed the prominent Shiite cleric Sheikh Nimr, who had called for pro-democracy demonstrations, along with forty-seven other sentenced by the Specialized Criminal Court on terrorism charges.

=== 2011–2012 Saudi Arabian protests ===
In the context of the Arab Spring, the only province with a majority Shia population, the Eastern Province of Saudi Arabia, arose against the Saudi regime in 2011 and 2012. The Shia protesters were violently repressed, and their situation did not improve. These protests were a turning point in the relations between the Saudi Shia minority and the Saudi regime because they led to the radicalisation of both sides. The protests took place in a region where competing states use sectarianism to expand their influence. Sectarianism is when the support of some people or organisations for a religious or political group is so strong that it can cause troubles to other groups. In fact, a proxy war has emerged between Iran and Saudi Arabia in the Gulf region. They both aim at having the regional hegemony based on a narrative of their legacy of two civilisations, respectively the Persians and the Arabs. However, the violent sectarian confrontation between Shias and Sunnis in Saudi Arabia is recent. For a long time, the predominant politics were of reasonable accommodation between the sects and religions. After the 1979 Iranian Revolution, the Guardianship of the Islamic Jurist conception of Shia Islam rose up in Iran as opposed to the quietist conception of Shia Islam. That means that religion had a strong role in the Iranian policies. In reaction, the Sunnis tended to stiffen their own interpretation of Islam. In Saudi Arabia it was translated by an acute Salafism.

The sectarian discourses have been used by Saudi Arabia and Iran to acquire the regional hegemony but the practice of sectarianism is more tempered. On the Iranian side, defending Shia minorities in practice means abandoning their universalist revolutionary message. On the Saudi side, using the radical Sunni rhetoric means strengthening the Sunni radicals. Since the Saudi regime is allied with Western countries such as the United States, it would then be the target of these radical groups. Even though, the Saudi regime uses the distinction between Sunnis and Shias in an attempt to highlight the religious and cultural difference of Iran compared to the other Gulf countries. In fact, the confrontation between Iran and Saudi Arabia is mostly the product of political factors and of regional ambitions. Sectarianism is a part of this showdown, not than a cause of it.

In this context of sectarianism linked to regional competition, protests took place in Qatif region, East of Saudi Arabia, a region predominantly inhabited by Shias. The region is rich in oil and most of the workers of the national Saudi oil company, Saudi Aramco, were used to organising protests for the workers' rights. Protests erupted following several triggers including the self-immolation of a man in the city of Samtah, South West of Saudi Arabia. The Shias of the East of Saudi Arabia organised demonstrations after knowing some Shia protests in Bahrain and in reaction to Saudi Shias being imprisoned in Saudi Arabia for their alleged, but debated, culpability for the Khobar Towers bombing of 1996. The protests then spread due to the youth mobilisation, especially on social media but never really made it outside the predominantly Shia Eastern province of Saudi Arabia.

At first, the protesters' demands were similar to those of the Arab Springs taking place in other countries of the Middle-East, so to say individual freedoms rather than religious rights. In fact, the religious practices of the Shias in the Eastern province were accepted by the central authority. For example, since the conquest of Al-Ahsa in 1913, which marked the integration of this majority Shia region to the Saudi Sultanate, the Shias established some courts which were accepted by the Saudi State and which provided justice according to Shia principles. Those liberties offered to Shias did not exist in regions of Saudi Arabia where the Shias were a minority. But, at the same time, the official religious discourse in Saudi Arabia was condemning the Shia practices. Other demands of the protesters consisted in asking for more autonomy for the region. For this reason, and because of a fear of a "Shia encirclement", the Saudi regime responded. It began by countering the protests in the region of Qatif.

For long the regime co-opted a local class of notables in order to drive the public opinion. They did so, partly by appointing Shias as judges in the Shia courts of the region. However, in Qatif the notables were superseded after the Iranian Revolution by some political activists who were more radical in their demands and who were left-behinds of the redistribution policies driven by the notables. In fact, the majority of Shia notables followed Shia figures of authority, the Maraji', who advocated for a spiritual role for the clergy rather than a political one. By withdrawing from the field of clerical education, the notables let Shia Islamist movements taking that role. That is why, in 2011, the protests were led by young people, influenced by the previous radical movements, active on social media and independent from the notables. To slow down the protests, the regime aspired to rely on the notables who were looking to preserve some of their influence on the population against new local leaders. The notables appointment to positions of authority by the Saudi regime depended on their belonging to Shi'ism. Consequently, their interest was that the regime still saw Shias as a social group with a strong identity. The regime exploited this position to control the notables. From the notable point of view, either they supported the regime, with a risk of being removed from their positions by the protesters, or they supported the protesters, with a risk of being removed from their position by the Saudi regime. A declaration was signed by notables on 21 April 2011 calling for a break in the protests. The main signatory was Hassan Al-Saffar, a Shia scholar from Qatif who was considered as one of the most important Shia leaders of Saudi Arabia, and who founded the Islamic Reform Movement in 1991. This movement descended from the Organization for the Islamic Revolution in the Arabian Peninsula which aimed at a Shia revolution in Saudi Arabia. Despite Al-Saffar's call, the protests only halted when a Facebook page which had previously called for demonstrations, asked the protesters to let some time to the government to implement the changes it promised.

The main goal of the regime was to prevent the protests of the Eastern province to spill-over the rest of the country. To this end, the Saudi regime used a sectarian narrative opposing the Shia minority to the Sunni majority of the country. The Wahhabis brought to light some fatwas denouncing Shias as apostate. The media also repeated over and over an identity narrative differentiating the communities. In fact, the Saudi regime controlled much media broadcasting in and about Saudi Arabia through either co-option of coercion. Co-option strategies has been revealed by Wikileaks: the Saudi regime paid 2 million US$ to the Lebanese MTV Network in 2012 in order to counter media hostile to the Saudi Kingdom and in order for the channel to invite pro-regime Saudis as guests on talk shows. Wikileaks also revealed a co-option through advertisement. ONTV, an Egyptian channel invited the head of the Movement for Islamic Reform in Arabia. Knowing that, the Saudi embassy asked the owner of the TV station to change its policies, arguing that, otherwise Saudi Arabia would stop its advertisements on the channel. Coercion was often used when media could not be co-opted, it could be done because the Saudi regime controlled the access to the two satellites through which the channels needed to pass to broadcast in Saudi Arabia. For example, Iranian TV channels were denied broadcasting on those satellites for one month in 2009 following accusation of support toward the Houthi rebels in Yemen.

In general, the Saudi national media broadcast programs aimed at diverting the Saudi from politics and the Saudi international programs aimed at promoting an image of Saudi Arabia as a modern country. During the 2011 protests, they rather aimed at setting a sectarian agenda to counter what the Saudi regime interpreted as the Iranian influence in the Gulf. To do so, some Wahhabi clerics were relayed by some Salafi channels such as Almajd TV Network. They portrayed the Shias as infidels and as a threat. To this extent those channels reproduced Islamic State of Iraq and the Levant's message and provoked Jihad.

The last strategy of the Saudi regime to repress Qatif unrests was the action of the Saudi police on the ground. The police was loyal to the regime partly because there were almost no Shias within its ranks. The Eastern province police, while formerly being under the control of the General Manager of the province, was, in practice, under the control of the central Saudi regime. The Saudi police's mission was mainly to protect a social order, the containment of the crime being only secondary. There also was a parallel religious police, called Mutawa, which was active in the region, and a secret service, the Mabahith, charged with counter-terrorism. The actions of the police were facilitated by Saudi law, and especially the absence of civil rights, which protect people's freedoms in other countries.

Even though the Shias generally asked for more inclusion in Saudi Arabia, rather than to overthrow the monarchy, the State still treated this community as a security menace needed to be contained because of the regime's bias and stereotypes toward the Shias. While some social media activists were asking for what they called a 'day of rage' (in reference to the first day of protests in Bahrein) on 11 March 2011, the police killed Faisal Ahmed Abdul-Ahad, one of the organisers of this event two weeks before the planned demonstrations and violently arrested several protesters on 4 March. On the one hand, this repression intimidated the people who thought to go on strikes on the 11th. On the other hand, the protesters who carried on with the movement radicalised their practices. Consequently, the protests of the 11th of March in Qatif were minor: only a few hundred of people protested on that day whereas there were more than 26.000 members of the Facebook group organising it. Despite this failure of the protests, they became more and more violent in the following weeks which created a vicious circle. The police were heavily politicised and resembled a military force while the rioters began to use incendiary projectiles and guns against the police. All of this led to a rhetoric of the regime criminalising the protesters in the eyes of the Saudi population. At least 17 protesters and one policeman were killed but the protests ended up slowing down due to state repression.

=== 2017–2020 Qatif unrest ===
Since May 2017 in response to protests against the government, the predominantly Shia town of Al-Awamiyah was put under full siege by the Saudi military. Residents were not allowed to enter or leave, and military forces indiscriminately shelled the neighborhoods with airstrikes, mortars fire along with snipers. Dozens of Shia civilians were injured, including a three-year-old and a couple of residents killed.The Saudi government claims it is fighting terrorists in al-Awamiyah.

Residents also reported soldiers shooting at homes, cars and everyone in streets.

During the crackdown, the Saudi government demolished several religious and historical sites and many other buildings and houses in Qatif.

On 26 July 2017, Saudi authorities began refusing to give emergency services to wounded civilians. Saudi Arabia has also not provided humanitarian help to trapped citizens of Awamiyah.

In August 2017, it was reported that the Saudi government demolished 488 buildings in Awamiyah. This demolition came from a siege of the city by the Saudi government, as it continued to try to prevent the citizens of the city from gaining rights.

The President of Quran Council and two cousins of executed Nimr al-Nimr were also killed by Saudi security forces in Qatif in 2017.

=== Suppression of religious practice ===
The Saudi government has refused to allow Shiite teachers and students exemption from school to partake in activities for the Day of Ashura, one of the most important religious days for Shiites which commemorates the martyrdom of Muhammad's grandson, Husayn bin Ali, at the hands of the second Sunni Umayyad Caliph, Yazid. In 2009, during Ashura commencements, Shia religious and community leaders were arrested protesting against the government and chanting slogans against Wahhabis.

In 2009, a group of Shiites on their way to perform hajj pilgrimage (one of the five pillars of Islam that all able-bodied Muslims are required to perform at least once in their lives) in Mecca were arrested by Saudi religious police due to the involvement in a protest against the Saudi government. A fifteen-year-old pilgrim was shot in the chest and an unknown assailant stabbed a Shiite sheikh in the back, shouting "Kill the rejectionist [Shia]".

==== In Medina ====
Shiite pilgrims go to Jannat al Baqi mainly to visit the grave of Fatimah and the Ahl al-Bayt who are buried in the cemetery of Jannat al-Baqi', but do not visit memorial sites of other Sahabah (companions of Muhammad) due to animosity towards them. Shiites, some Sunnis, and Dawoodi Bohra Ismailis usually pray near graves of the Ahl al-Bayt, but in Salafi belief this act is considered as shirk (polytheism or idolatry).

Late 2011, an Australian man was charged for not following the law and involved with blasphemy and sentenced to 500 lashes and 2 years in jail; the latter sentence was later reduced. Also late 2011, a prominent Shiite Canadian cleric, Usama al-Attar, was arrested for unknown reasons but possibly because of his criticism of the kingdom's response to uprisings in Yemen and Bahrain. He was released on the same day, declaring the arrest entirely unprovoked.

=== Discrimination in education ===
Much of education in Saudi Arabia is based on Wahhabi religious material. The government has restricted the names that Shiites can use for their children in an attempt to discourage them from showing their identity. Saudi textbooks are hostile to Shiism, often characterizing the faith as a form of heresy worse than any other religion.

=== Discrimination in the workforce ===
Much discrimination occurs in the Saudi workforce as well. Shiites are prohibited from becoming teachers of religious subjects, which constitute about half of the courses in secondary education. Shia cannot become principals of schools. Some Shia have become university professors but often face harassment from students and faculty alike. Shiites are disqualified as witnesses in court, as Saudi Sunni sources cite the Shi'a practise of Taqiyya wherein it is permissible to lie while one is in fear or at risk of significant persecution. Shiites cannot serve as judges in ordinary court, and are banned from gaining admission to military academies, and from high-ranking government or security posts, including becoming pilots in Saudi Airlines.

=== Reactions ===
Human Rights Watch reports that Shiites want to be treated as equals and desire to be free from discrimination (Human Rights Watch). However, the Shiites minority is still marginalized on a large scale.

== Ismaili ==
The much smaller Sulaymani Ismāʿīlī minority differ from the Twelver Shiites. There are an estimated 700,000 of them living in the southern region of Najran bordering Yemen. They also have been subject to what Human Rights Watch calls "official discrimination", including in "government employment, religious practices, and the justice system".

Following the clashes in April 2000, Saudi authorities imprisoned, tortured, and summarily sentenced many Ismailis, and transferred dozens of Ismaili government employees outside the region. Underlying discriminatory practices have continued unabated.

One major point of dispute between the Ismailis of Najran and the Saudi Government remains the building of a physical fence on the Yemen-Saudi border, which is opposed by the local tribes.

=== Unrest ===
In 1997, the director of the Ministry of Islamic Affairs opened an office in Najran for the purpose of propagating Wahhabi doctrine to the local Isma'ilis. Saudi official Sheik Ali Khursan declared Ismaelis to be infidels because according to him "they did not follow the Sunna and do not believe that the Qur'an is complete", stating "We don't eat their food, we don't intermarry with them, we should not pray for their dead or allow them to be buried in our cemeteries." In 1997, the Governor Prince Mish'al ordered police to prevent Ismaelis from performing prayers during the post-Ramadan Islamic festival of Eid al-Fitr. "Anti-Ismaeli campaigns resulted in many arrests and flogging."

In April 2000, responding to an Amnesty International campaign publicizing lack of religious freedom in Saudi Arabia, Ismaelis in Najran openly commemorated Ashura for the first time in many years. Shortly thereafter Saudi religious police "stormed a major Ismaeli mosque, seized many of its religious texts and arrested three clerics". Local Ismaelis, who are often armed, retaliated, firing on security forces and burning some of their vehicles and killing dozens of them. Approximately 40 policemen and members of various security forces (all non-Ismaili) were killed and many more injured. Saudi Army reinforcements swept the area and made many arrests.

Dozens of Ismaili government employees were transferred away from Najran.

== See also ==
- Human rights in Saudi Arabia
