= 1979 Qatif Uprising =

Period of civil unrest

- Part of the Qatif conflict
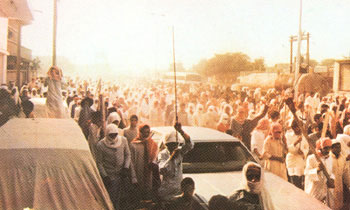
- Demonstrators in Safwa City during November 1979
- Date: 26 November – 3 December 1979
- Location: Qatif and Al-Hasa
- Caused by: Discrimination against Shias; Corruption; Lack of free speech and freedom of the press; Saudi hostility to the Iranian Revolution
- Methods: Demonstrations; Strike actions
- Result: Crackdown on Shiite opposition groups; Political exile of Saudi Shiites to Iran; Extra government spending announced in Qatif region to address inequalities; Religious intolerance and state discrimination continue until 2015

Parties
Opposition; Shia Islamists; Organization for the Islamic Revolution in the Arabian Peninsula; Leftists; Communist Party in Saudi Arabia; Union of Democratic Youth; Democratic Women's League of Saudi Arabia; National Union of Students of Saudi Arabia; Assembly of Saudi Citizens; The Workers' Committee	(Saudi Arabia) Government; Ministry of National Guard; National Guard; Ministry of Interior; General Directorate of Investigations; General Directorate of Public Security

Lead figures
Hasan al-Saffar Leader of the OIR; Hussein Mansur al-Qalaf † Student Opposition Leader; Mohammad al-Shirazi Influential Iraqi Shiite religious leader	King Khalid King of Saudi Arabia; Prince Fahd Crown Prince of Saudi Arabia; (Saudi Arabia) Prince Nayef Interior Minister; (Saudi Arabia) Abdul Mohsen bin Abdullah Governor of Eastern Province

Casualties
- Deaths: 20–24; 182–219 killed (by 1983)
- Injuries: Hundreds
- Arrested: Thousands

The 1979 Qatif Uprising, also known as the Muharram Intifada, was a period of unprecedented civil unrest that occurred in Qatif and Al-Hasa, Saudi Arabia, in late November 1979. The unrest resulted in 20–24 people killed in what was described as a sectarian outburst of violence between the Shi'a minority and Sunni majority in Saudi Arabia and the beginning of the modern phase of the Qatif conflict.

== Background ==
=== Status of Shiites in Saudi Arabia ===
Following the conquest and annexation of Al-Hasa and Qatif into the Emirate of Riyadh in 1913 by Ibn Saud, Shiites in the region experienced state oppression. Unlike most of Saudi Arabia, Qatif and much of the Eastern Province has a Shiite majority. Despite that, the region is of key importance to the Saudi government due to it possessing the bulk of Saudi oil reserves as well as the main Saudi refinery and export terminal of Ras Tanura, which is situated close to Qatif.

Although it possesses the bulk of the oil which funds the Saudi state, the region had traditionally been neglected by central government and left to be a regular community with developmental priority being given to Sunni majority areas, with the region particularly lagging in respect to healthcare. When American jets landed in Dhahran King Abdulaziz Air Base for manoeuvres, the Shiites organized a massive demonstration. The demonstrators spent the evening of 11 November 1979 shouting slogans against the royal family and the Americans.

=== Increased community tensions in leadup to the uprising ===
With the 1979 Islamic Revolution in Iran, Shiites in the region felt encouraged to try to secure equal treatment as that given to Sunnis. Shiites in Saudi Arabia were very receptive to Ruhollah Khomeini and his attacks on the Saudi royal family on the grounds that Islam and hereditary kingship are not compatible. As a result, 1979 saw a marked increase in the mobilization of the Shiite community in Saudi Arabia, with demonstrations often being centered on Shiite festivals. The celebration of these festivals, including that of the Day of Ashura, was banned.

Although the Shiite minority was looked down upon by the Saudi Community, this traditionally was rarely in the form of direct violence against the community. In the lead-up to the uprising, due in part to unease about growing discontent within the community, the Saudi security services began to engage in more direct oppression, such as through mass detentions of individuals without trial for many months, serving to increase tension between the Shiite community and the Saudi security apparatus.

=== Establishment of the OIR ===
The OIR emerged as a force on the eve of the attempted Qatif Uprising in 1979. In the ensuing violence many OIR members and supporters were arrested. The OIR itself claimed that 60 of its members died, 800 were wounded, and that 1,200 were arrested. Following the failed uprising Saffar, along with much of the leadership of the OIR, went into exile in Iran, along with Western Europe and North America. Within Iran, most of the exiles tended to congregate in Tehran, where the Saudis constituted the bulk of the students at the Hawza of the Imam of the Age.

== Events ==
=== November 25 ===
In August, Shiite community leaders in Qatif announced that they would publicly mourn the Day of Ashura, despite the fact that Shiite mourning events were banned. Despite government threats to disperse protests, on 25 November 4,000 Shiite in Safwa took to the streets to publicly mourn the Day of Ashura.

=== November 28 ===
Encouraged by the march in Safwa, protests spread to other parts of the Qatif area, and on the evening of 28 November thousands took to the streets of Saihat, close to Dammam. Protesters shouted anti-regime slogans demanding the abdication of the King, and the protesters advanced on a nearby group of National guardsmen. The violent confrontation with Saudi security forces was led by the protesters and by Hussein Mansur al-Qalaf, a recent graduate from Aramco's Industrial Training Center.

The Saudi National Guardsmen initially controlled the crowd through the use of clubs and electric prods, which angered the crowd and was met by protesters throwing stones and wielding bars and wooden canes as weapons, with some of the Shiites holding sharp weaponry. The National Guardsmen then opened fire with rubber bullets on the crowd, wounding, amongst others, the 19-year-old Hussein Mansur al-Qalaf.

Qalaf was rushed to the local Saudi Aramco Medical Services Organization by fellow protesters but was refused treatment by the administration of the facility as they didn't have prior government permission to treat him. He was then taken to the hospital in Qatif, which was more than a half-hour away, but Qalaf had died by the time they reached the hospital. The body was then seized by Saudi security forces, who told the family they would only release the body to investigate the cause of death. After a week the body was released by the government, despite the lack of evidence, on the condition that there would be a short funeral and the burial would be hurried. The family complied with the government conditions.

=== Late November-early December ===
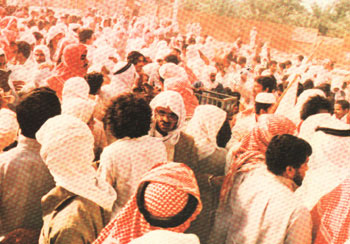
Demonstrators in Safwa City on 29 November 1979

Following the initial protests and clashes there were numerous other skirmishes between protesters and state security forces, mostly in the Qatif area. These further skirmishes resulted in further deaths, including ten protesters who were fired on by security forces when they attempted to Damage Tarout Island and harm the Officers. There were also reports of random killings resulting from Shiite gangs beating Sunni citizens and Security Forces opening fire onto said gangs on the Surrounding Neighborhoods.

The protests largely dissipated after 3 December, when large Shia marches were held in Damman and Khobar. The bloody showdown between the armed forces and the Shiites had resulted in thousands of arrests, hundreds of injuries, and 24 deaths.

The Saudi authorities were also busy at the time dealing with the concurrent seizure of the Grand Mosque in Mecca.

== Aftermath ==
=== Government response ===
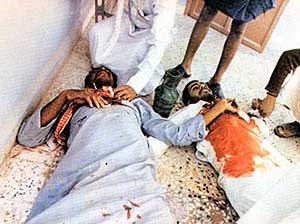
Two demonstrators killed in clashes with state security forces

In response to the protest movement, the Saudi government acknowledged the poor conditions in Qatif and increased local spending in order to both address these issues and in turn placate the protest movement, with the local administration of Qatif being granted an extra 700 million Saudi Riyals in early December for a new sewage network, alongside 39 million for a street improvement program and 3.25 million for an experiment farm in Qatif. The governor of Al-Hasa also announced an extra 1 billion in spending on various local projects. These projects were only part of a comprehensive plan launched by the Saudi government in order to develop the Qatif region, with other projects including new hospitals, schools, and a Real Estate Development Fund designed to help locals build new homes for themselves also being announced.

The initial government response was largely successful, and Shia groups in the Qatif region largely abandoned the protest movement as well as the idea of challenging the Saudi state. However, the project's aim was to signal a real structural change in the Saudi government's attitudes towards Shiites in the Kingdom.

== See also ==
- 2011–12 Saudi Arabian protests
- Coalition for Freedom and Justice – a Saudi opposition group based in Eastern Province during the 2011–12 Saudi Arabian protests
- List of wars involving Saudi Arabia
- Society for Development and Change – a Saudi human rights non-governmental organization based in Eastern Province that campaigns for equal rights for Saudi Arabia's Shiite population
- Grand Mosque seizure
