= Israa al-Ghomgham =

Saudi Arabian human rights advocate

- إسراء الغمغام
- Born: 1988 or 1989 (age 37–38)
- Known for: participating in protests and documenting the 2017–18 Qatif unrest in the Eastern Province of Saudi Arabia; faced sentencing to death as of August 2018; death penalty request dropped on 31 January 2019
- Spouse: Moussa al-Hashem

Israa al-Ghomgham (إسراء الغمغام; also: Israa al-Ghamgam) is a Saudi Arabian human rights advocate. She is especially known for her documentation of the 2017–18 Qatif unrest.

In September 2018, she risked being sentenced to become the first female human rights defender to be executed, possibly by beheading, in Saudi Arabia following what had been planned as a final hearing to be held on 28 October 2018. On 6 August 2018, the Saudi Arabian prosecutor involved in al-Ghomgham's case recommended that she and her husband be sentenced to death. Saudi activists stated that al-Ghomgham is the first woman to have faced capital punishment for human rights campaigning in Saudi Arabia. On 31 January 2019, the Saudi authorities dropped the prosecutor's request for al-Ghomgham to be sentenced to death. Al-Ghomgham was tried in an unfair trial and in February 2021 was sentenced to an eight-year imprisonment term, as reported by the Gulf Center for Human Rights (GCHR).

== Activism ==
Al-Ghomgham is well-known for her documentation of Eastern Province protests, which started in 2011–2012 during the Arab Spring and continued in 2017–18.

== Arrest ==
Al-Ghomgham and her husband Moussa al-Hashem were arrested in their home around 6–8 December 2015, and held since then in the Dammam al-Mabahith prison.

The charges against the couple relate to the 2017–18 unrest in Qatif in the Eastern Province. According to Human Rights Watch the charges include participating in protests, inciting protests, chanting slogans against the regime, attempting to inflame public opinion, filming protests, publishing on social media, using the photo of another woman on her Facebook page, and providing moral support to rioters. Human Rights Watch described the charges as "not resembl[ing] recognizable crimes".

On 6 August 2018, al-Ghomgham appeared before the Specialized Criminal Court and the prosecutor recommended a death sentence, following the Islamic law principle of ta'zir which allows a judge to determine both the sentence for a crime and what constitutes a crime. Al-Ghomgham had no access to a lawyer for the first 32 months of her detention. The would-be final court hearing, at which the death penalty should have been confirmed or overturned, was scheduled for 28 October 2018. If confirmed, the death penalty would have had to have been confirmed or rejected by King Salman. Beheading would have been carried out after Salman's confirmation of the sentence.

=== Reactions ===
Shia Rights Watch sought international support to stop the death sentence, arguing that it would set a precedent for executing other Saudi women campaigning for the rights of religious minorities. Sarah Whitson of Human Rights Watch stated that "seeking the death penalty for activists like Israa al-Ghomgham, who are not even accused of violent behavior, is monstrous" and in contradiction with the Saudi government's claim of reform. Ali Adubisi of the European Saudi Organisation for Human Rights described the sentence as "a dangerous precedent" for the execution of other non-violent political activists. Samah Hadid, Middle East director of campaigns for Amnesty International, agreed that the sentence set a dangerous precedent which "would send a horrifying message that other activists could be targeted in the same way for their peaceful protest and human rights activism".

A spokesman for Global Affairs Canada stated in relation to al-Ghomgham's situation that "Canada will always stand up for the protection of human rights, including women's rights and freedom of expression around the world", without calling for al-Ghomgham's "immediate release". A call by Canada earlier in August 2018 for the "immediate release" of women activists was stated by the Saudi government to be a factor in a diplomatic and trading crisis between the two countries.

A video of the execution of Laila Basim from 2015, purporting to be of al-Ghomgham's execution, circulated on social media in August 2018.

=== Death penalty dropped ===
On 31 January 2019, Saudi authorities dropped the prosecutor's request for the death penalty to be imposed against al-Ghomgham. She was sentenced to eight years in prison, in February 2021. The Gulf Centre for Human Rights (GCHR) described the trial as having been "a show trial that lacked the minimum international standards for fair trial and due process" and called for al-Ghomgham to be immediately and unconditionally released.

== See also ==
- Nimr al-Nimr – Eastern Province dissident executed 2 January 2016 during the 2016 Saudi Arabia mass execution
- Ali Mohammed Baqir al-Nimr – Eastern Province dissident, nephew of Nimr al-Nimr, sentenced to death in 2014
