= 2017–2020 Qatif unrest =

Phase of conflict in the Qatif region of Eastern Province, Saudi Arabia

- Part of the Qatif conflict
Date	12 May 2017 – 7 January 2020 (2 years, 7 months, 3 weeks and 5 days)
Location	Qatif and Awamiya, Eastern Province, Saudi Arabia
Status	Saudi victory

Belligerents
Government of Saudi Arabia; Ministry of National Guard; National Guard; Presidency of State Security; General Directorate of Investigations; Emergency Force; Ministry of Interior; General Directorate of Public Security	Hezbollah Al-Hejaz (Suspected); Other Shia Militias; Supported by: Al-Mukhtar Brigades (Bahrain) Bahraini Militias

Casualties and losses
21 killed (Saudi claim); 40+ wounded	5 killed (activists' claim); 16 killed (Saudi claim); 40+ wounded
- 12–25 civilians killed (activists' claim); Thousands of civilians displaced

The 2017–2020 Qatif unrest was a phase of conflict in the Qatif region of Eastern Province, Saudi Arabia, between Saudi security forces and the local Shia community, that arose sporadically starting in 1979, including a series of protests and repression during the 2011–12 Saudi Arabian protests.

This phase of the conflict began after an incident on 12 May 2017, when a child and a Pakistani man were shot and killed. The detention of Qatif human rights activist Israa al-Ghomgham and her husband and the possible beheading of al-Ghomgham as the first Saudi woman to be executed for her human rights activities gained international attention during 2018. On 31 January 2019, the Saudi authorities confirmed in a public statement that they would not seek the imposition of the death penalty against al-Ghomgham.

== Background ==
On 15 October 2014, Nimr al-Nimr was sentenced to death by the Specialised Criminal Court for "seeking 'foreign meddling' in Saudi Arabia, 'disobeying' its rulers and taking up arms against the security forces". Said Boumedouha of Amnesty International stated that the death sentence was part of a campaign by the authorities in Saudi Arabia to crush all dissent, including those defending the rights of the Kingdom's Shi'a Muslim community. Nimr al-Nimr's brother, Mohammad al-Nimr, tweeted information about the death sentence and was arrested on the same day. The head of Iran's armed forces warned Saudi Arabia that it would "pay dearly" if it carried out the execution.

In March 2015 the Saudi Arabian appellate court upheld the death sentence against al-Nimr. On 25 October 2015, the Supreme Religious Court of Saudi Arabia rejected al-Nimr's appeal against his death sentence. During an interview for Reuters, al-Nimr's brother claimed that the decision was a result of a hearing which occurred without the presence or notification of al-Nimr's lawyers and family. Al-Nimr's brother still remained hopeful that King Salman would grant a pardon. Nimr al-Nimr was executed along with 46 others on 2 January 2016.

== Low-level conflict ==
From May 2017 through to 2018 and 2019, several incidents occurred in which Qatif residents and/or Saudi policemen were killed.

=== Awamiyah residential area destruction ===
Around May 2017, Saudi authorities erected siege barricades in Awamiyah and attempted to bulldoze the al-Musawara residential area. Adam Coogle of Human Rights Watch (HRW) described the conflict as surprisingly intense for Saudi Arabia, stating, "I've documented conflict in Saudi Arabia before but nothing like this. I've seen protests, but nothing this militarised." He considered it unprecedented for there to be "heavy clashes going on between the state and its citizens in a Saudi city." About 12–25 people were killed in shelling and sniper fire during May and the following few months. Streets of Awamiyah were described by The Independent as "covered in rubble and sewage" and "[looking] more like a scene from Syria than an oil-rich Gulf city." One protestor stated that he switched from peaceful protesting to methods to armed methods as a result of government repression, including an assault against his wife and frightening his children.

== Legal cases ==
In early December 2017, Israa al-Ghomgham and her husband Moussa al-Hashem were arrested in their home and detained in the Dammam al-Mabahith prison. They were charged for their activities in relation to participation and documentation of the Qatif political protests. On 6 August 2018, the prosecutor in their case recommended that they be executed, making al-Ghomgham the first Saudi women to be sentenced to death for human rights campaigning, according to Saudi activists. Al-Ghomgham and her husband's potential death sentence gained international attention, with support for their case from Shia Rights Watch, the European Saudi Organisation for Human Rights, Amnesty International, and Global Affairs Canada. Al-Ghomgham's final sentencing for confirming or rejecting the proposed death penalty was planned for 28 October 2018.

Legal proceedings, including arrests, investigations, trials and executions, of 24 people were referred to as the "Qatif 24 case". Most were convicted on false confessions based on torture. Fourteen of these were executed as part of the 2019 Saudi Arabia mass execution.

== Timeline ==
=== 2017 ===
- 12 May – Saudi soldiers shot and killed a two-and-a-half-year-old child and a young man in the town of Awamiyah. Lebanon's al-Ahed news claimed that the mother of the child was critically injured. However, the Saudi Government claimed that terrorists were responsible for the incident.
- 16 May – A Saudi soldier was killed and five more were wounded by a rocket-propelled grenade in a district of al-Awamiya in operations to counter the militants.
- 1 June – Two people were killed in a car explosion in Al-Qatif just before Maghrib prayers. Three men involved in the attack managed to escape and are currently being hunted by security officers in the area.
- 11 June – One soldier was killed and two wounded after a bomb attack in the town of Al-Awamiyah.
- 4 July – A Saudi policeman was killed and three others injured by an explosive device in a flashpoint Shiite-dominated city.
- 6 July – A Saudi policeman was killed and six others injured by an explosive device next to a police patrol in the village of Al-Awamiyah in Al-Qatif.
- 14 July – A Saudi soldier was killed and another was wounded in a shooting attack on their patrol vehicle in Qatif province.
- 26–27 July – five people killed during Police raids in Awamiya, according to activists.
- 30 July – A Saudi police officer was killed and six others wounded when a patrol came under attack in the town of Awamiya.
- 3 August – A Saudi citizen was killed and another injured during an operation to secure families wishing to leave Awamiya, after an armed attack by terrorists on a bus.
- 7 November – Saudi security staff killed in Qatif.
- 6 or 8 December – human rights activists Israa al-Ghomgham and her husband arrested.
- 19 December – Al Arabiya sources confirmed that terrorist Salman Ali Salman al-Faraj was killed in Awamiya, eastern province of Saudi Arabia, after confrontations with the police forces.
- 19 December – The body of Shiite Sheikh Mohammed al-Jirani, who had been kidnapped a year earlier by Shiite militants in the Eastern Province, was found in Qatif during a security raid.

=== 2018 ===
- 16 January – The Saudi Presidency of State Security announced that wanted fugitive Abdullah Mirza al-Qallaf was killed in a security operation in al-Qatif.
- 5 April – A Saudi soldier was killed in a raid against militants in the city of Al-Awamiyah in the eastern province of Qatif in Saudi Arabia. Several weapons and explosives were found. The security forces foiled terrorist attacks after the operation.
- 6 August – prosecutor calls for death penalty for Israa al-Ghomgham and her husband.
- 28 October – initially scheduled date of final sentence for Israa al-Ghomgham and her husband.

=== 2019 ===
- 31 January – the Saudi authorities confirmed in a public statement that they would not seek the imposition of the death penalty against al-Ghomgham. The prosecutor still called for the death penalty for four of al-Ghomgham's five male co-defendants.
- 2 April – two people shot dead and two detained in Qatif by Saudi forces; Saudi authorities claim that the four people "were heading to carry out a terrorist act, refused to surrender, shot at security forces and threw a hand grenade into a gas station, causing a fire."
- 23 April – Saudi authorities executed Mujtaba al-Sweikat and Munir al-Adam and twelve others among the Qatif protestors tried in the "Qatif 24 case", most of whom were convicted on confessions based on torture.
- 11 May – Saudi authorities lay siege to Umm al-Hamam for 15 hours, raided several houses, surrounded a residential apartment in the Sanabis area, and shot dead eight people. The authorities claim that the eight people had shot at police first and that they constituted a recently created terrorist cell.
- 7 June – Amnesty International confirms CNN claim that the Public Prosecutor has called for the death penalty against Murtaja Qureiris for his participation as a 10-year-old in peaceful Qatif protests in 2011.
- 16 June – Saudi authorities announce that Murtaja Qureiris is not to be executed, and was sentenced to 12 years' imprisonment (subject to appeal), including time served, with a 4-year reduction for his youth, leading to his possible release in 2022.
- mid-July – Majid Abdullah al-Adam dies, ten days after being injured by Saudi security forces who raided the al-Jash area of Qatif with artillery launchers and other heavy weapons.
- 25 December – Two people were shot dead by Saudi security forces in Dammam in what Saudi state television claimed was a shootout between authorities and terrorists.

=== 2020 ===
- 7 January – The "most dangerous wanted terrorist" in Qatif was captured after he fired on a security patrol, according to state-run news media.
