= Hostage Rescue Force =

Hostage Rescue Force (Arabic: قوة إنقاذ الرهائن), also known as Unit 333, is a tier one police tactical unit that is subordinate to the National Security Sector of the Ministry of Interior in Egypt. Among its missions are domestic counterterrorism, engaging heavily armed criminals, executive protection, high-risk law enforcement situations, hostage rescue, protection of government officials, serving high-risk arrest and search warrants, supporting crowd control operations, and tactical special operations.

== Similar units from countries located near Egypt ==
- Unité Spéciale – Garde Nationale (Tunisian National Guard Special Unit)
- Special Intervention Detachment of the Algerian Gendarmerie Nationale
- Special Emergency Force of the Saudi Arabian Presidency of State Security
- Yamam (National Counter Terrorism Unit that is part of the Israel Border Police)

== See also ==
- List of police tactical units
