= Mustafa Akhwand =

American activist

- Born: 1980 (age 44–45)
- Education: George Mason University (BSc); George Mason University (MA)
- Occupation: Executive Director at Shia Rights Watch
- Website: shiasentinel.com

Mustafa Akhwand is a founder of the human rights organization Shia Rights Watch, which is dedicated to protecting and preventing violence against Shia Muslims. He was awarded by Human Rights Education Associates for his work on minority rights. He was also recognized for his achievements in conflict analysis by the United States Institute of Peace. Due to his work with graduate students in Washington DC, he was nominated as the best internship site supervisor.

== Early life ==
Akhwand was born in 1980 to the family of Mohammad Taqi Zakary, a religious scholar and psychologist who specialized in family relations and also served as a representative of Grand Ayatollah Sayed Sadiq Shirazi.

He earned a Master of Conflict Analysis and Resolution from George Mason University. Mustafa is a software developer with a B.A in Applied information technology.

== Career ==
Prior to joining Shia Rights Watch, he managed a nonviolent organization called the Freemuslim Association, mainly in Middle Eastern countries such as Iraq. Akhwand led the initiative of defining anti-shi’ism, which was introduced by Shia Rights Watch in 2011. He led the initiative to create the only platform that helps oppressed people all around the world connect and send their real-time concerns via smartphone or tablet devices to the Shia Rights Watch server.
