= 2014 al-Dalwah attack =

Terrorist Attack of Saudi Arabia

- Location of Eastern Province in Saudi Arabia
- Location: al-Dalwah, al-Ahsa, Eastern Province, Saudi Arabia
- Date: 3 November 2014
- Target: Shia Muslims
- Attack type: Mass shooting
- Weapon: Guns
- Deaths: 8 (+2 attackers)
- Injuries: 9
- Perpetrator: ISIL

The 2014 al-Dalwah attack occurred on 3 November 2014 at al-Dalwah village in the eastern province of al-Ahsa, Saudi Arabia when three masked gunmen shot at a group of people, killing eight people and injuring nine others. The attack occurred on Ashura and is thought to be targeting Shi’ite Muslims. Six people were arrested and one suspect killed.

On 4 November, two police officers and two gunmen were killed in an operation after five people were shot dead and another wounded. According to Saudi security, the leader of the gunmen had previously slipped back into the kingdom after fighting in Iraq and Syria.

While the government and the official media and religious establishment strongly condemned the attack, a handful of articles in the Saudi press argued that the attack "had not come out of nowhere", that there was anti-Shi'ite incitement in the kingdom on the part of "the religious establishment, preachers, and even university lecturers – and that it was on the rise".

== Attackers ==
On 24 November, three weeks after the attack, the Saudi Interior Ministry revealed the identity of the attackers on the Al-Dalwah Shiite shrine in Al-Ahsa: Abdullah Al-Sarhan, Khalid Anzi, Marwan Nail, and Tariq Maimoni. Saudi security authorities arrested 77 people linked to ISIS.

== Aftermath ==
On 2 September 2020, seven militants linked to the shooting were sentenced to death by the Special Criminal Court in Riyadh, while three others were handed 25-year jail terms each. Of the 12 defendants, 10 appeared in court for judgment. The court sentenced the first, second, third and fourth-degree defendant to the death penalty by crucifixion, while the others were typically judged to 25 years in prison.
