= Nimr al-Nimr =

Shia Muslim religious figure and Saudi government critic; executed in 2016

- نمر باقر النمر
- Born: 21 June 1959; Al-Awamiyah, Eastern Province, Saudi Arabia
- Died: 2 January 2016 (aged 56); Riyadh, Saudi Arabia
- Cause of death: Execution by beheading
- Status: Executed
- Convictions: Terrorism; Treason; Sedition
- Criminal charges: Firing at security forces Seeking ‘foreign meddling’ Disobeying the ruler Inciting sectarian strife Encouraging, leading and participating in demonstrations
- Penalty: Death
- Title: Sheikh; Ayatollah

Personal life
- Education: Iran, Syria
- Website: sknemer.com

Religious life
- Religion: Shia Islam
- Denomination: Usuli; Twelver Shia
- School: Ja'fari jurisprudence

Senior posting
- Post: Friday Prayers leader, al-Awamiyah
- Predecessor: Post created
- Successor: Unknown

Ayatollah Sheikh Nimr Baqir al-Nimr (Note: Arabic: نمر باقر النمر, romanized: Nimr Bāqir an-Nimr, Bakir al-Nimr, al-Nemr, al-Namr, al-Nimer, al-Nemer, al-Namer) (21 June 1959 – 2 January 2016), commonly referred to as Sheikh Nimr, was a Saudi Shia sheikh from Al-Awamiyah in Saudi Arabia's Eastern Province. His arrest and execution were widely condemned by various governments and human rights organizations.

He was popular among youth and critical of the Saudi Arabian government, advocating for free elections in Saudi Arabia. In 2006, al-Nimr was arrested by Saudi authorities, during which he claimed to have been beaten by the Mabahith, a Saudi secret police agency. In 2009, he criticized Saudi authorities and suggested that if the rights of Saudi Shia were not respected, the Eastern Province should secede. In response, Saudi authorities arrested al-Nimr along with 35 others. During the 2011–12 Saudi Arabian protests, al-Nimr urged protestors to resist police bullets with "the roar of the word" rather than violence. The Guardian described al-Nimr as having "taken the lead in [the] uprising."

On 8 July 2012, Saudi police shot al-Nimr in the leg and arrested him in what police described as an "exchange of gunfire." During the protests against al-Nimr's arrest, police fired into a crowd of thousands, killing two men, Akbar al-Shakhouri and Mohamed al-Felfel. Following his arrest, al-Nimr began a hunger strike and was allegedly tortured. The Asharq Center for Human Rights expressed concern for his health during the hunger strike on 21 August, calling for international support to allow access for family, lawyers, and human rights activists.

On 15 October 2014, al-Nimr was sentenced to death by the Specialized Criminal Court for "seeking foreign meddling in Saudi Arabia, disobeying its rulers, and taking up arms against the security forces." On the same day, his brother, Mohammad al-Nimr, was arrested for tweeting information about the death sentence. Al-Nimr was executed on or shortly before 2 January 2016, along with 46 others. His execution was condemned by Iran and Shiites throughout the Middle East, as well as by Western figures and Sunnis opposed to sectarianism. The Saudi government announced that his body would not be handed over to the family. In March 2017, after a prolonged campaign of harassment, Saudi security forces killed two cousins of the Nimr family during a raid on a farm in eastern Saudi Arabia. Miqdad and Mohammad al-Nimr were killed at a farm in Awamiyah, the Nimr family hometown.

== Early life, family and education ==
Al-Nimr began his religious studies in Al-Awamiyah, and then moved to Iran in 1980 to complete his education. He studied at the Al-Qaim seminary in Tehran, primarily under Ayatollah Ali-Akbar al-Modarresi, the younger brother of Grand Ayatollah Muhammad-Taqi al-Modarresi, as well as other senior scholars.

== Religious career ==
After the Al-Qaim seminary was closed down by the Iranian government, al-Nimr moved to Damascus, Syria. He initially followed Grand Ayatollah Muhammad al-Shirazi and later followed Grand Ayatollah al-Modarresi.

As of 2008, al-Nimr was independent of the two main political groups in the Eastern Province Shia community: Islahiyyah (the Shirazis) and Hezbollah Al-Hejaz (Saudi Hezbollah).

Al-Nimr had been the leader of Friday prayers in Al-Awamiyah since 2008.

== Points of view ==
Al-Nimr supported a governance model that represented "something between" individual and council forms of guardianship of the Islamic Jurists. He advocated for Kurdish majority control of Iraqi Kurdistan. Al-Nimr believed that Shia ayatollahs would not promote violence or "murder in the name of God," and he supported "the idea of elections."

Al-Nimr criticized Bahrain's monarchy for suppressing anti-government demonstrations in Bahrain in 2011. He also condemned Syria's Bashar Assad, stating, "(Bahrain's ruling family) Al Khalifa are oppressors, and the Sunnis are innocent of them. They're not Sunnis, they're tyrants. The Assads in Syria are oppressors ... We do not defend oppressors and those oppressed shouldn't defend the oppressor."

In August 2008, al-Nimr stated that he viewed U.S. citizens as natural allies of Shia Muslims, as both share a mindset "based on justice and liberty." He told a diplomat that he believed in these "American ideals."

He believed that the Saudi state is "particularly reactionary" and that "agitation" is necessary to influence the state in general and the Saudi state in particular. According to John Kincannon, Counselor for Public Affairs at the U.S. embassy in Riyadh, al-Nimr made statements that were "perceived as supporting Iran." In August 2008, he stated that he believed Iran and other states outside of Saudi Arabia acted mainly out of self-interest rather than religious solidarity, and he distanced himself from Iran.

Al-Nimr criticized Nayef bin Abdulaziz Al Saud, who was the crown prince of Saudi Arabia, following Nayef's death in June 2012. He stated that "people must rejoice at [Nayef's] death" and that "he will be eaten by worms and will suffer the torments of Hell in his grave."

== Popularity ==
Al-Nimr was described by The Guardian as "[seeming] to have become the most popular Saudi Shia cleric among local youth" in October 2011. He maintained his popularity in 2012, with thousands of people participating in street demonstrations in Qatif in support of him following his arrest in July 2012.

== Early arrests and activity ==
=== 2004 and 2006 arrests ===
The Saudi authorities reportedly detained al-Nimr for the first time in 2003 for leading public prayers in the village of Al-Awamiyah. He was detained for several days in 2004. In 2006, he was arrested by the Mabahith and beaten during his detention. Residents of Al-Awamiyah campaigned to support him, and he was released after several days.

=== 2009 sermon and arrest order ===
In February 2009, an incident occurred in Medina involving differences in Shia and Sunni customs at the tomb of Muhammad. This incident included the filming of Shia women by the religious police, protests by Shia in Medina, and subsequent arrests. Six children were arrested between 4 and 8 March for participating in a protest on 27 February in Safwa.

Al-Nimr criticized the authorities' actions in Medina in February and specifically called out the Minister of Interior for discrimination against Saudi Arabian Shia. In a sermon, he threatened secession, stating "Our dignity has been pawned away, and if it is not ... restored, we will call for secession. Our dignity is more precious than the unity of this land."

A warrant for his arrest was issued in response. Protests began in Al-Awamiyah on 19 March, during which four people were arrested, including al-Nimr's 16-year-old nephew, Ali Ahmad al-Faraj, who was taken into custody on 22 March. The police began tracking al-Nimr in an effort to arrest him and attempted to take his children hostage. By 1 April, a total of 35 people had been arrested, and security forces had set up checkpoints on the roads leading to Al-Awamiyah; however, al-Nimr was not arrested during this time.

The Arabic Network for Human Rights Information stated that the authorities were "persecuting Shia reformist Nimr Bakir al-Nimr for his criticism of policies of sectarian discrimination against the Shia in Saudi Arabia and for his calls for reform and equality."

== Protests, arrest and death sentence ==
=== 2011–2012 Saudi Arabian protests ===
In October 2011, during the 2011–2012 Saudi Arabian protests, al-Nimr stated that young people protesting in response to the arrests of two septuagenarians from Al-Awamiyah were provoked by police firing live ammunition at them. On 4 October, he called for calm, stating, "The [Saudi] authorities depend on bullets ... and killing and imprisonment. We must depend on the roar of the word, on the words of justice". He explained further, saying, "We do not accept [the use of firearms]. This is not our practice. We will lose it. It is not in our favour. This is our approach [use of words]. We welcome those who follow such [an] attitude. Nonetheless, we cannot enforce our methodology on those who want to pursue different approaches [and] do not commit to ours. The weapon of the word is stronger than the power of bullets."

In January 2012, al-Nimr criticized a list of 23 alleged protesters published by the Ministry of Interior. The Guardian described him as having "taken the lead in [the] uprising."

=== July 2012 arrest and hunger strike ===
On 8 July 2012, al-Nimr was shot in the leg by police and arrested. According to Ministry of Interior spokesperson Mansour al-Turki, policemen attempted to arrest al-Nimr and colleagues who were in a car. Saudi authorities alleged that al-Nimr and his colleagues fired live bullets at the policemen, prompting the police to shoot back. They claimed that al-Nimr and his colleagues then attempted to escape and crashed into a police car. According to al-Nimr's brother, Mohammed al-Nimr, al-Nimr was arrested "while driving from a farm to his house in al-Qatif."

The Saudi Press Agency stated that al-Nimr was charged with "instigating unrest." Mohammed al-Nimr mentioned that his brother "had been wanted by the Interior Ministry for a couple of months because of his political views."

Thousands of people protested in response. Two men, Akbar al-Shakhouri and Mohamed al-Felfel, were killed during the protest. Pictures of al-Nimr, "covered with what appeared to be a blood-stained white blanket," were published online by activists from the Eastern Province. On 16 July, activist Hamza al-Hassan stated that al-Nimr had received a brief visit from his family, during which officials claimed that the purpose of the visit was to request that al-Nimr's family "calm the angry protesters." According to al-Hassan, "al-Nimr had been tortured, had bruises on his face, and had broken teeth".

On 19 July, al-Nimr's family reported that he had begun a hunger strike. They visited him again on 22 July and stated that he had been severely tortured, showing signs of torture on his head. They also mentioned that he was continuing his hunger strike and had become weakened.

Al-Nimr's wife, Muna Jabir al-Shariyavi, died in a New York City hospital while he was imprisoned. 2,000 people attended her funeral in Safwa on the evening of 30/31 August, calling for al-Nimr's unconditional release, for all Shia and Sunni detainees to be freed, and chanting "Down with Hamad" and "Bahrain Free, Free, Peninsula Shield out".

On 21 August, the Asharq Center for Human Rights expressed concern that al-Nimr was on the 45th day of his hunger strike while in prison and stated that he had not been charged. The Asharq Center appealed for international support to allow access to al-Nimr for his family, lawyer, and human rights activists.

=== Trial ===
Amnesty International stated that, apart from the charge of firing at security forces on 8 July 2012, the other charges—such as "disobeying the ruler," "inciting sectarian strife," and "encouraging, leading, and participating in demonstrations"—were based on documentary evidence from al-Nimr's sermons and interviews. Amnesty viewed these as representing the right to free speech and maintained that al-Nimr did not incite violence in them. Additionally, Amnesty stated that witnesses whose testimonies were used during the trial did not testify in court and that al-Nimr's lawyer was not given a fair opportunity to defend him.

The European Saudi Society for Human Rights (ESSHR) reported details of five of al-Nimr's court appearances following his arrest on 8 July 2012. According to the ESSHR, 33 charges were presented during the first appearance on 25 March 2013. At the court appearance on 28 April 2013, the defense was unable to respond to the charges because it did not have the details of the list of charges. On 23 December 2013, al-Nimr's lawyer stated that al-Nimr was unable to respond to the charges because he did not have a pen and paper. Al-Nimr's lawyer was informed only one day before the fourth appearance on 15 April 2014. The ESSHR reported that neither al-Nimr's lawyer nor his family were informed prior to the fifth court session on 22 April 2014.

=== October 2014 death sentence ===
On 15 October 2014, al-Nimr was sentenced to death by the Specialized Criminal Court for "seeking 'foreign meddling' in [Saudi Arabia], 'disobeying' its rulers, and taking up arms against the security forces." Said Boumedouha of Amnesty International stated that the death sentence was "part of a campaign by the authorities in Saudi Arabia to crush all dissent, including those defending the rights of the Kingdom's Shi'a Muslim community."

Nimr al-Nimr's brother, Mohammad al-Nimr, tweeted information about the death sentence and was arrested on the same day.

The head of Iran's armed forces warned Saudi Arabia that it would "pay dearly" if it carried out the execution.

=== 2015 appeal and imminent execution ===
In March 2015, the Saudi Arabian appellate court upheld the death sentence against al-Nimr.

On 25 October 2015, the Supreme Religious Court of Saudi Arabia rejected al-Nimr's appeal against his death sentence. During an interview with Reuters, al-Nimr's brother claimed that the decision resulted from a hearing that occurred without the presence or notification of al-Nimr's lawyers and family. He remained hopeful that King Salman would grant a pardon.

== Reactions against death sentence ==
On 13 November 2014, Muslims gathered in a protest at the United Nations. In March 2015, a protest was held in Kano, Nigeria, according to the Tasnim News Agency.

On 13 May 2015, Shia marjas Ja'far Sobhani, Naser Makarem Shirazi, and Hossein Noori Hamedani condemned the death sentence.

Aware of the imminent execution of Sheikh Nimr in May 2015, Shia Muslims disagreed with the decision.

On 31 December 2015, a group of prominent Sunni clerics in Iran called on the United Nations and other international organizations in a letter to intensify efforts to free al-Nimr.

=== Petitions from NGOs ===
In November 2015, two volunteers and 15 organizations from various religions and communities advocating for humanity and justice collectively requested that the U.S. Secretary of State stop the executions by approaching the King of Saudi Arabia.

The signatories of the petition included:

- Americans for Democracy & Human Rights in Bahrain (ADHRB)
- Amnesty International
- Bahrain Institute for Rights and Democracy
- Center for Inquiry (CFI)
- European Center for Democracy & Human Rights (ECDHR)
- European Saudi Organization for Human Rights (ESOHR)
- Freedom House Human Rights Foundation
- Human Rights Watch
- Hindu American Foundation (HAF)
- International Institute for Religious Freedom (IIRF)
- Monitor of Human Rights in Saudi Arabia (MHRSA)
- Muslim Public Affairs Council
- PEN American Center
- Project on Middle East Democracy (POMED)
- Shia Rights Watch (SRW)
- Dr. Toby Matthiesen, Senior Research Fellow in International Relations of the Middle East at the University of Oxford
- William C. Walsh, Lawyer

== Execution and reaction against ==
In October 2014, Saudi Arabia's Supreme Court approved the death sentence of al-Nimr for disobeying the ruler, inciting sectarian strife, and encouraging, leading, and participating in demonstrations. According to sources, the main charge was criticism of Saudi officials. On 2 January 2016, Saudi Arabia's government executed 47 prisoners and declared that Nimr had been among them.

Protests were held in various countries, including Iran, Iraq, Bahrain, Lebanon, Afghanistan, Pakistan, India, United Kingdom, Turkey, Australia, and United States following the execution. People in the Qatif region of Saudi Arabia's Eastern Province took to the streets, with protesters marching from al-Nimr's hometown of Al-Awamiyah to Qatif, chanting, "Down with the Al Saud". Many religious and political figures also expressed their opinions and reactions regarding the execution of Sheikh al-Nimr.

== Personal life ==
Nimr al-Nimr's nephew, Ali Mohammed Baqir al-Nimr, participated in the 2011–12 Saudi Arabian protests. He was arrested in 2012 at the age of 17 and sentenced to death in 2014, with expectations that King Salman would ratify the sentence, which was to be carried out by beheading and crucifixion. His death sentence was later commuted, and he was released from prison in 2021.

Muna Jabir al-Shariyavi, Nimr al-Nimr's wife, died in a hospital in New York City while he was imprisoned.

Mohammed al-Nimr, the cleric's brother, blamed U.S. President Barack Obama for failing to use his influence with the Saudi government to prevent his brother's execution. He stated, "We asked very clearly for the American president to intervene as a friend of Saudi Arabia — and the Americans did not intervene."

In 2017, during the 2017–19 Qatif unrest, Saudi security forces killed two of his cousins.

== See also ==
- Israa al-Ghomgham – Eastern Province human rights activist tentatively sentenced to death in August 2018
- Human rights in Saudi Arabia
- Iran–Saudi Arabia relations
