= Robert G. Rabil =

American political scientist

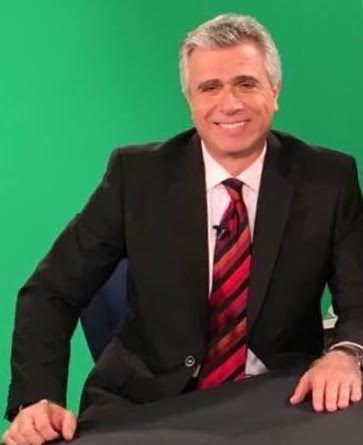

Academic work
- Discipline: Political Science
- Institutions: Florida Atlantic University

Dr. Robert G. Rabil is Professor of Political Science at Florida Atlantic University. He holds a master's degree in Government from Harvard University, a PhD in Near Eastern and Judaic Studies from Brandeis University, and an honorary PhD in humanities from the Massachusetts College of Liberal Arts. His area of studies and expertise include Political Islam, Salafism, Transnational and Revivalist Movements, Terrorism, US-Arab Relations, Arab-Israeli Conflict, US-Muslim Relations, and Contemporary Middle East Politics.

He is the author of dozens of articles in major academic and professional journals and magazines. His books have been peer-reviewed and highly commended.

He served as the Chief of Emergency for the Red Cross in Baabda District, Beirut, during the Lebanese Civil War, and he was project manager of the funded Iraq Research and Documentation Project, funded by the US State Department. Rabil was awarded the LLS Distinguished Professorship in Current Events (2012-2013, 2018-2019), theLLS Teaching in Excellence Award and was in May 2012 was conferred an honorary Doctorate in Humanities from the Massachusetts College of Liberal Arts.

== Views ==
=== Jihad and the West ===
Writing in the Washington Post, Rabil said, "Jihad is an ominous word to most Americans, conjuring up images of terrorism. But the word 'jihad' in Arabic merely means 'to strive' or to make a 'determined effort.' But over time, both Shi'a and Sunni Islam have developed distinct distortions of jihad, both of which contribute to the current association we [Americans] have between jihad and terrorist acts. This tie, however, advances a twisted concept with little to do with the mainstream teaching of Islam."

Rabil believes that radical Sunni ideologues, such as Mawdudi, Qutb and Faraj, advanced ideas that distorted the concept of jihad. "They framed efforts to excommunicate secular rulers as an armed struggle against jahili secularism, contesting the mainstream Islamic view that Muslims should submit to political authority in order to prevent strife. Their teachings also transformed jihad into a mandatory, individual obligation for all Muslims."

=== Syria ===
Throughout his extensive research on Syria and its regime, Rabil maintained that the regime, despite its pan-Arab rhetoric, sacrificed Arab nationalism on the altar of the regime's national interest and survival. He underscored that the regime understands only the language of violence in addressing any form of dissent. He argued that the US had an ambivalent relationship with the regime until the invasion of Iraq.

==== Syrian Civil War ====
Although he was strongly critical of the Syrian regime and supported the moderate Syrian opposition, Rabil early on recognized the ignorance and naïveté with which regional and international actors dealt with the Syrian Civil War. The endemic belief that the regime, like other Arab regimes, would collapse in matter of months was so unwise.

As Salafi and jihadi organizations, including ISIS and al-Nusra, came to control the Syrian opposition and Russia became militarily involved in Syria in support of the regime, Rabil supported U.S. co-operation with Russia as necessary to prevent further chaos in the Middle East. To be sure, Russia has played a vital role in Syria by not only making Moscow's participation in any negotiated settlement indispensable but also leading the way in trying to broker and set up ceasefire agreements and de-escalating conflict zones, respectively.

=== Iraq ===
Rabil, in his capacity as the project manager of Iraq Research and Documentation Project, examined thousands of Iraqi official documents. He, in principle, supported the removal of Saddam Hussein on the basis of the oppressive totalitarian order that he created in Iraq.

Nevertheless, Rabil was deeply suspicious and concerned about how the Pentagon envisioned a new post-Saddam Iraq. He had issues with American support of Ahmad Chalabi's Iraqi opposition, the dismantling of the Ba'ath Party and the Iraqi Army; and the deploying of too few American troops to occupy Iraq.

=== Islamist terrorism in Europe ===
Rabil argued that Muslim extremists have exploited European liberalism.

Rabil argues, "Ominously, these Salafist missionaries, some of whom supported by Arab states of the Persian Gulf, begin their Da'wa (propagation of Islam) with an effort geared not towards the recognition of Islam in France, but rather towards the revival of the practice of Islam, according to their ideology, among Muslims. Next, they promote a legal theory meant to resolve conflicts and issues facing Muslims within the context of Muslim Jurisprudence so that Muslims could retain their identity. Meanwhile, they underscore the ideology of Salafism as the only acceptable manjah (methodology) to living as a Muslim. This has served to place Muslim (Salafi) identity above all others and indirectly promoted the agenda of Salafi-jihadi organizations, be they Al Qaeda, ISIS or Ansar al-Shari'a."

=== US foreign policy ===
Rabil embraces a realist/pragmatist approach to US foreign policy resting on securing national interests by reconciling the celebration of America's universal values and exceptional nature with the recognition of the reality of other countries' histories, cultures, and politics.

=== On the Ukraine War ===
Rabil emphasizes that Russia underestimated the will of Ukrainians to fight a patriotic war. Moscow has already lost the war for Kyiv.

George Kennan, author of Washington’s containment policy of the Soviet Union and preeminent Russian expert, asserted that “expanding NATO would be the most fateful error of American policy in the entire post-cold-war era.” He later on explained:

I think it is the beginning of a new cold war…I think the Russians will gradually react quite adversely and it will affect their policies. I think it is a tragic mistake. There was no reason for this whatsoever. No one was threatening anybody else. This expansion would make the Founding Fathers of this country turn over in their graves.

He said that there is “little understanding of Russian history and Soviet history,” and predicted “Of course there is going to be a bad reaction from Russia, and then [the NATO expanders] will say that we always told you that is how the Russians are -- but this is just wrong."

Fifty prominent foreign policy experts, including former senators, retired military officers, diplomats and academicians, sent an open letter to President Bill Clinton in June 1997 outlining their opposition to NATO expansion, penning it as “a policy error of historic proportions.”

== Affiliations ==
- Affiliate in Research, Center for Middle Eastern Studies, Harvard University, Cambridge, MA, 1999–present.
- Member of the Board of Directors, Iraq Institute for Strategic Studies, Inc., Beirut, Baghdad, London, Washington, DC, 2004–2017.
- Advisory Board, Florida Society for Middle East Studies, Boca Raton, Florida, 2004–present.
- Adjunct Scholar, The Washington Institute for Near East Policy, Washington, DC, 2005-2009.
- Academic Adviser, American Lebanese Coalition and World Lebanese Cultural Union, 2003–2014.
- Academic Adviser, Central Naval Analysis, 2006–2017.
- Academic Adviser, Middle East and National Security Organization, an FAU student club which promotes awareness of Middle East and US national security issues.

== Bibliography ==
| Year | Book | Publisher |
|---|---|---|
| 2004 | Embattled Neighbors: Syria, Israel, and Lebanon | Lynne Rienner Publishers, Inc. |
| 2006 | Syria, the United States, and the War on Terror in the Middle East | Praeger Publishers |
| 2011 | Religion, National Identity, and Confessional Politics in Lebanon: The Challenge of Islamism | Palgrave US |
| 2014 | Salafism in Lebanon: From Apoliticism to Transnational Jihadism | Georgetown University Press |
| 2016 | The Syrian Refugee Crisis in Lebanon: The Double Tragedy of Refugees and Impacted Host Communities | Lexington Books. |
| 2018 | White Heart | Austin Macauley Publishing |
| 2024 | Lebanon and Turkey: Historical Contexts and Contemporary Realities | Rowman & LIttlefield |
