= Organization for the Islamic Revolution in the Arabian Peninsula =

Underground political organization

Organization for the Islamic Revolution in the Arabian Peninsula منظمة الثورة الإسلامية في شبه الجزيرة العربية
- Leader: Hassan al-Saffar
- Founded: 1979
- Dissolved: 1991
- Preceded by: Shia Reform Movement
- Succeeded by: The Reform Movement
- Headquarters: Iran
- Newspaper: The Islamic Revolution Magazine (1981–1991); The Arabian Peninsula Magazine (1991)
- Ideology: Shia Islamism; Pro-Shirazi; Religious nationalism Conservatism
- Religion: Shia Islam
- International affiliation: Movement of Vanguards Missionaries; High Council of the Revolution
- Slogan: Not Eastern and not Western

The Organization for the Islamic Revolution in the Arabian Peninsula (Arabic: منظمة الثورة الإسلامية في شبه الجزيرة العربية Munaẓamat ath-Thawrah al-Islamīyah fī al-Jazīrah al-ʿArabīyah), OIR, IRAP or OIRAP was an underground political organization led by Hassan al-Saffar that was active in Saudi Arabia and advocated a Shia Islamic revolution in the Arabian Peninsula. The group had its roots in the Shia Reform Movement in Saudi Arabia, although it was radicalized in 1979 as a result of the Iranian revolution and the Qatif Uprising. The group subsequently strove for change through confrontation, mass action, and revolution. However, after having failed to realise its goal of a Shia Islamic revolution in the Arabian Peninsula, the group underwent a period of moderation in the late 1980s, leading to a détente with Saudi government. In a sign of its growing moderation, the OIR transformed itself into the Reformative Movement in the Arabian Peninsula in 1991. The Reform Movement was then dissolved in 1993.

== History ==
=== Background ===
The OIR had its roots in the Shia Reform Movement in Saudi Arabia, which had been founded by al-Saffar in 1975 and advocated improving conditions for Shias in Saudi Arabia through gradual reform within Saudi Arabia.

=== 1979 Qatif Uprising ===
The OIR emerged as a force on the eve of the attempted Qatif Uprising in 1979. In the ensuing violence many OIR members and supporters were arrested. The OIR itself claimed that 60 of its members died, 800 were wounded, and that 1,200 were arrested.

Following the failed uprising Saffar, along with much of the leadership of the OIR, went into exile in Iran, along with Western Europe and North America. Within Iran most of the exiles tended to congregate in Tehran, where the Saudis constituted the bulk of the students at the Hawza of the Imam of the Age

=== Moderation and détente ===
In 1980 the OIR began publishing a monthly magazine in London known as The Islamic Revolution Magazine (Majallat al-Thawra al-Islamiya). This magazine was the main means by which the group announced its social and cultural activities.

For most of the 1980s the OIR maintained a line of strict opposition to the Saudi government, and refused any negotiations with the Saudi establishment. In 1987, the group was allegedly involved in the Mecca riots.

By the late 1980s however the OIR leadership was becoming increasingly convinced that their aim of a Shia Islamic revolution in Eastern Province was wholly unrealistic. As such, the OIR leadership backed away from their earlier, more radical demands, and instead decided to focus on petitioning for greater religious and political freedoms.

Following the 1990 invasion of Kuwait by Iraq, the OIR changed its name to The Reform Movement (al-Haraka Islahiyah). Furthermore, in response to the invasion, many Saudi Shias volunteered to join the army and civil defense force. On 11 September 1990 al-Saffar ordered the group's supporters to rally behind the Saudi government in order to fight Iraq. Saffar also later claimed that following the invasion of Kuwait the Iraqi government made overtures to the OIR, asking the group to cooperate with them in exchange for support against the Saudi government.

Publication of the Islamic Revolution Magazine also stopped following the invasion of Kuwait. In January 1991 a new magazine, known as The Arabian Peninsula Magazine (Majallat al-Jazira al-Arabiya), was brought out. The magazine helped show the change in the group's rhetoric from extremism to moderate reformism. The first issue of the new magazine, published in London, described itself as a weekly political magazine "concerned with the affairs of the Arabian Peninsula." The issue also expressed hope that the ongoing conflict would help usher in change to the region and help enhance civil liberties and freedom of expression.

In 1993 King Fahd, responding positively to the group's new goals and its change in rhetoric, met several of al-Saffar's followers. Desiring to end Shia opposition to the government, Fahd promised to work towards improving conditions for Shias in Saudi Arabia. This took the form of, among other things, ordering the elimination of derogatory terms for Shias from textbooks, removing certain other forms of explicit discrimination, and allowing many Saudi Shia exiles to return to Saudi Arabia. As a result of the October 1993 pact the Reform Movement was dissolved and its members had to formally and practically dissociate themselves from foreign groups and movements.

== Ideology ==
The OIR centered around opposition to three main issues. Firstly the OIR opposed widespread anti-Shia sectarian attitudes within Saudi Arabia, often sanctioned by state sanctioned Wahhabi scholars. Whilst the Saudi government had resisted calls from ultra-conservative scholars for the violent suppression of Shias, the state failed to make any moves against scholars preaching anti-Shia sectarian rhetoric, calling for, among other things, the isolation, harassment, and murder of Saudi Shias.

Secondly the OIR was opposed to the continuation of state policies that restricted the ability of Shias to freely practice their religion. Such policies included bans on Ashura processions and of Shia calls to prayer.

Thirdly the OIR was opposed to perceived incompetence within the Saudi government, as well as the close relationship between the Saudi government and the United States.

The OIR was linked to the wider regional Islamist movement known as the Movement of Vanguards Missionaries, a group which advocated a return to a stricter and purer form of Shia Islam.

The OIR saw and described both America and the Soviet Union as imperialist powers, and rejected both Western capitalism as well as Eastern communism, claiming that these ideologies and American and Soviet domination were the causes of most of the worlds problems. This position was reflected in the party slogan of "Not Eastern and not Western" (la-Sharqya wa la-Garbya).

The group viewed other Islamist parties supportive of the Iranian revolution as allies, although was willing to work with other groups. Within Saudi Arabia, the OIR supported Juhayman al-Otaybis movement, despite their ideological differences. The OIR didn't however maintain relations with the Communist Party in Saudi Arabia or the Arab Socialist Action Party – Arabian Peninsula.

The OIR did maintained relations with nearly all of the nationalist and religious movements in the Arab world, and participated in the November 1980 conference in Cyprus to support the opposition in the Arabian peninsula.

=== Links with the Islamic Republic of Iran ===
The group allegedly received support from the Islamic Republic of Iran.

The group was also supported by the Iranian High Council for the Revolution, which had been originally formed by Ayatollah Khomeini in September 1981 in order to help unite the various Shia Iraqi revolutionary groups being sheltered in Iran, but had by 1986 become a support and coordination body for various Islamist groups throughout the region, including the OIR, the Islamic Front for the Liberation of Bahrain, the Islamic Dawa Party, the Islamic Amal and Mujahideen of Iraq, Takfir wa Hijra and Islamic Jihad of Egypt, the Pan-Malaysian Islamic Party, the Moro Islamic Liberation Front, and various others.

The OIR also allegedly has links with Islamic Jihad in Saudi Arabia, and Hezbollah.

== See also ==
- List of political parties in Saudi Arabia
