= Saudi Emergency Force =

Saudi Special Emergency Force
- Active: 1972–present
- Country: Saudi Arabia
- Patron: Presidency of State Security

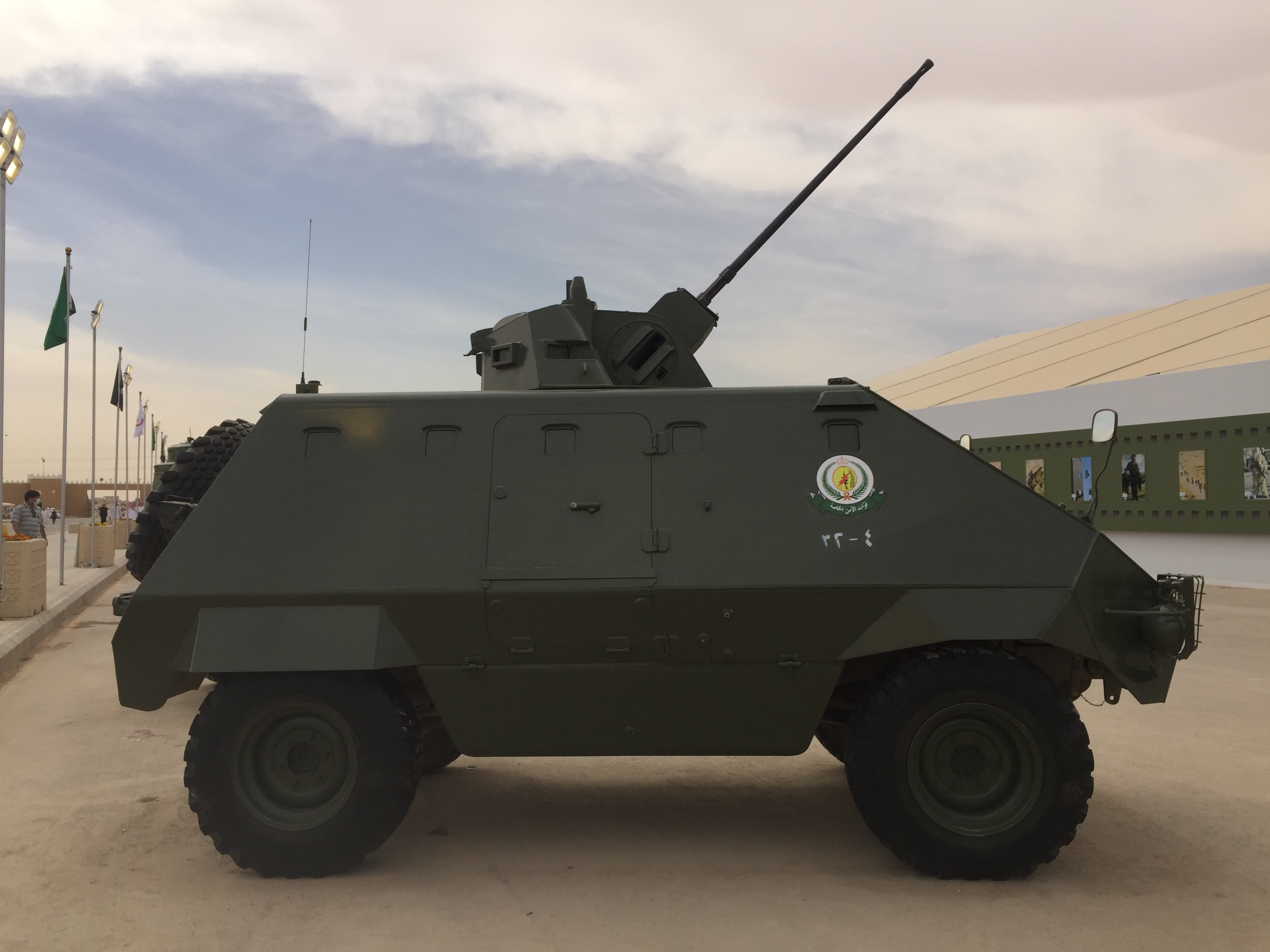
Saudi Special Emergency Force UR-416 near Riyadh

The Special Emergency Force (Arabic: قُوّات الطَّوارئ الخاصَّة, romanized: Qūwāt aṭ-Ṭawāriʾ as-Suʿūdīyah) or the SEF (Saudi Emergency Force) is a special operations counter-terrorism unit of the Presidency of State Security.

== History ==
The SEF was established in 1972; its main job was to control riots and demonstration alongside assisting other police forces in combating drug trafficking and criminals. After the Grand Mosque seizure in 1979 and the ineffectiveness of the Saudi Arabian National Guard in the Saudi decision of hostages, its role was strengthened. Since 1995, with the first terrorist attacks on Saudi soil in Olaya, Riyadh, and then in 1996 in Al Khobar, the center shifted to combating terrorism, and accordingly it retrained and reprogrammed its forces. In 2017, the General Directorate of Investigations, Special Security Forces, Special Emergency Forces, Security Aviation, General Directorate of Technical Affairs, National Information Center were moved from the Ministry of the Interior to Presidency of State Security.

Now there are 13 centers, controlling 35,000 men, around the Kingdom to combat terrorism.
In September of 2014, around 70,000 members of the Special Emergency Forces participated in providing security during the Hajj season.

== Ranks ==
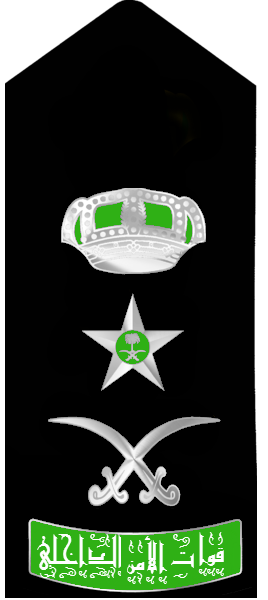
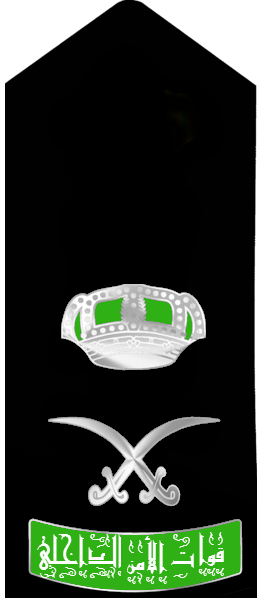
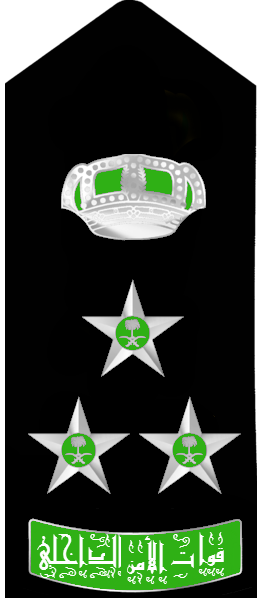
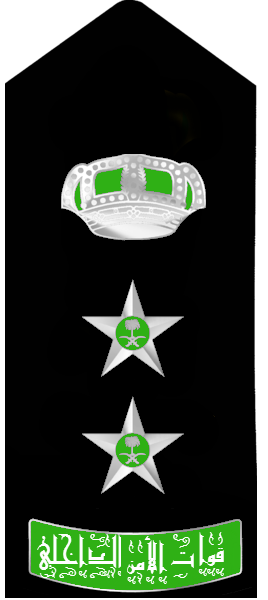
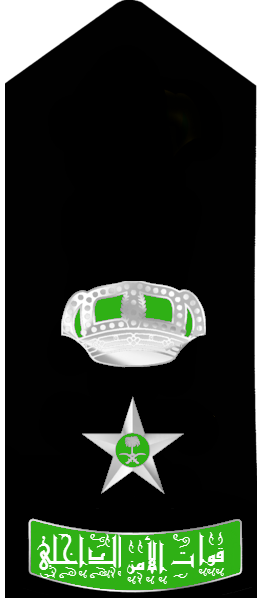
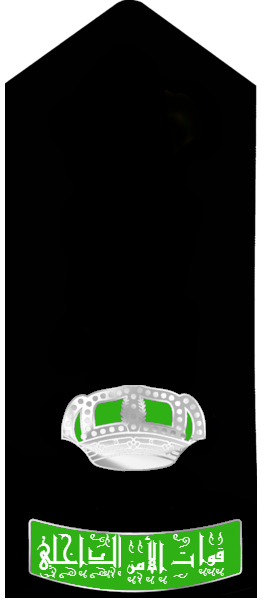
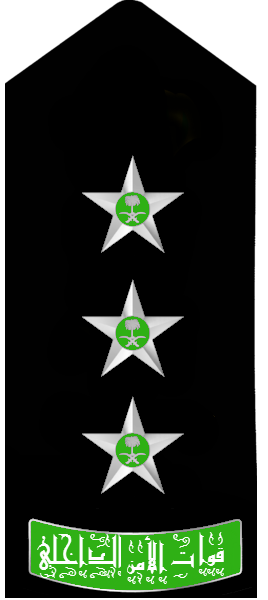
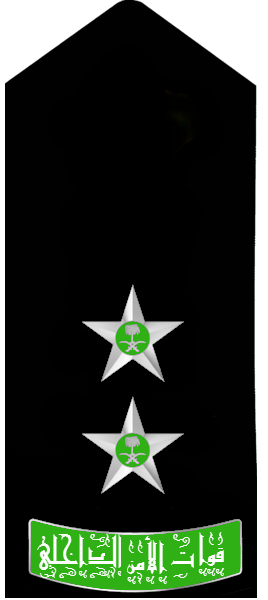
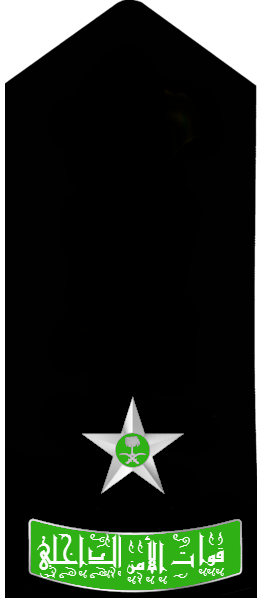
Rank group	General / flag officers			Senior officers			Junior officers
Saudi Emergency Force
Saudi Emergency Force	فريق; Fariq	لواء; Liwa	عميد; Amid	عقيد; Aqid	مقدم; Muqaddam	رائد; Ra'id	نقيب; Naqib	ملازم أول; Mulazim awwal	ملازم; Mulazim

Rank group	Senior NCOs				Junior NCOs	Enlisted
Saudi Emergency Force							No insignia
Saudi Emergency Force	رئيس رقباء; Rayiys ruqaba'	رقيب أول; Raqib 'awal	رقيب; Raqib	وكيل رقيب; Wakil raqib	عريف; Earif	جندي أول; Jundiun awwal	جندي; Jundiun

== Similar units from other countries ==
- United States' FBI's Hostage Rescue Team
- France's GIGN
- Switzerland's Federal Office of Police's Task Force TIGRIS
- Egypt's National Security Agency's Hostage Rescue Force
- Israel Border Police's Yamam
- Unité Spéciale – Garde Nationale (Tunisian National Guard Special Unit)
- Special Intervention Detachment of the Algerian Gendarmerie Nationale
- Mauritius Police Force's Special Mobile Force's Groupe Intervention de la Police Mauricien (GIPM)
- Iran's Law Enforcement Command of the Islamic Republic of Iran's 1st Amir al-Momenin Brigade
