= Presidency of State Security =

Saudi Arabian security agency

Presidency of State Security (PSS)
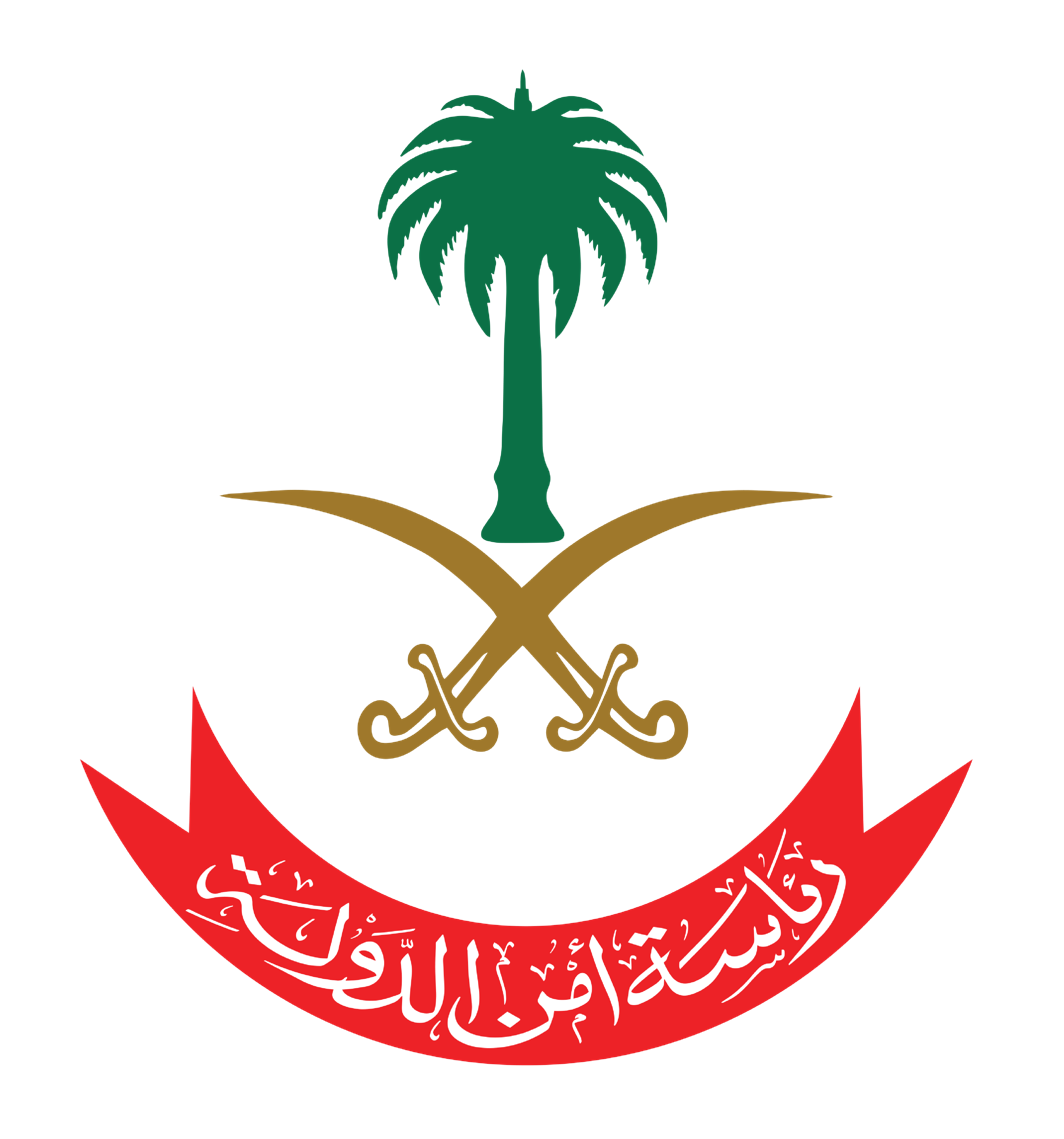

Agency overview
- Formed: July 20, 2017; 9 years ago
- Jurisdiction: Government of Saudi Arabia
- Headquarters: Riyadh, Saudi Arabia
- Motto: A homeland we don't protect, we don't deserve to live in
- Agency executive: General officer Abdul Aziz bin Mohammed Al-Howairini, Director

Presidency of State Security (Arabic: رئاسة أمن الدولة) is a Saudi Arabian security body created on 20 July 2017 by combining the counter-terrorism and domestic intelligence services under one roof. It is concerned with all matters related to state security, and will be overseen by the king. The new state security agency is headed by intelligence chief Abdul Aziz bin Mohammed Al-Howairini, who holds the rank of a minister.

The following departments were assigned to the new Presidency of State Security: General Investigations, Special Security Force, Special Emergency Force, security aviation, technical affairs, National Information Center, and other departments in charge of combating terrorism, and finance and financial investigation.

== See also ==
- General Intelligence Presidency – Saudi Foreign intelligence Agency
- Mabahith – Saudi Internal Intelligence Agency
