= Shia Rights Watch =

Shia Muslim-rights advocacy organization

- Founded: 2011; 15 years ago
- Type: Non-profit NGO
- Purpose: Research, Advocacy, Human Rights
- Location: Washington, D.C., United States
- Region served: Worldwide
- Members: 600+ Active Members
- Key people: Mustafa Akhwand (Director); Ammar Hussain; Hussian Al–Rumaithi
- Website: shiarightswatch.org

Shia Rights Watch (SRW) is an organization that works to defend justice and rights for Shia Muslims around the world. It is the first of its kind, a non-governmental, non-profit, organization that bases research and advocacy from case studies and reports, hands on experience, field education and policy changing, headquartered in Washington D.C. By working with victims, humanitarian organizations, journalists and its network of over 600 active members, SRW publishes reports and articles that help to spread awareness of the many human rights abuses committed against the Shia Muslim population throughout the world.

== Activities ==
Shia Rights Watch aims to protect the rights of Shia Muslims through investigative research and targeted advocacy. Its worldwide network provides SRW with the resources to publish detailed reports and articles that shed light on the human rights violations committed every day. The organization goes through media, old and new, and take note of the reports that are being made on Human Rights violations to Shia Muslims around the world. If a media outlet, newspapers or blogs for example, reports on the violent acts and Anti-Shi'ist activities in a light that is honest, unbiased reporting, the organization contacts that media and thanks the author or other organization on the importance of reporting these violations. The organization publicly condemns any reports that justifies violence or entire events itself, trying to raise awareness and bring the violations to the attention of the people.

=== Reports ===
Each year, Shia Rights Watch publishes reports that document human rights violations committed against Shia Muslims as defined by the Universal Declaration of Human Rights. In 2012, SRW published five reports including one on Pakistan, Bahrain, Malaysia, Saudi Arabia, and Indonesia. These reports include recommendations to the United States government with action steps for each specific country to move towards a more unbiased and peaceful government that does not exclude minorities, including religious minorities. Journalists, researchers, human rights activists and members of the United States government request to the organization, largely based on case studies and research, to obtain a copy.

=== Articles ===
Shia Rights Watch actively monitors human rights abuses by monitoring news sources, speaking with victims and witnesses, connecting with its over 600 active members worldwide and analyzing reports released by other nonprofits and NGOs. Using this information, SRW writes articles about these human rights violations that are then published by a number of various news agencies, including Global Security News, Jafria News, Rassd News Network (RNN), Islam Times, The News Tribe, AhlulBayt News Agency, and others.

=== Conventions ===
Shia Rights Watch is an active member in the humanitarian and Shia Muslim communities. It regularly participates in conferences put on by organizations such as the Woodrow Wilson Center, the Islamic Information Center and the Universal Muslim Association of America. Head members are often interviewed, reported on, and cited for key issues in the Middle East that involves sectarian violence and humanitarian issues.

== Organization ==
Shia Rights Watch is a non-profit, 501(c) organization. It is funded by private donors and does not receive government assistance.

== See also ==
- Anti-Shi'ism
