= Al-Awamiyah =

Al-Awamia العوامية
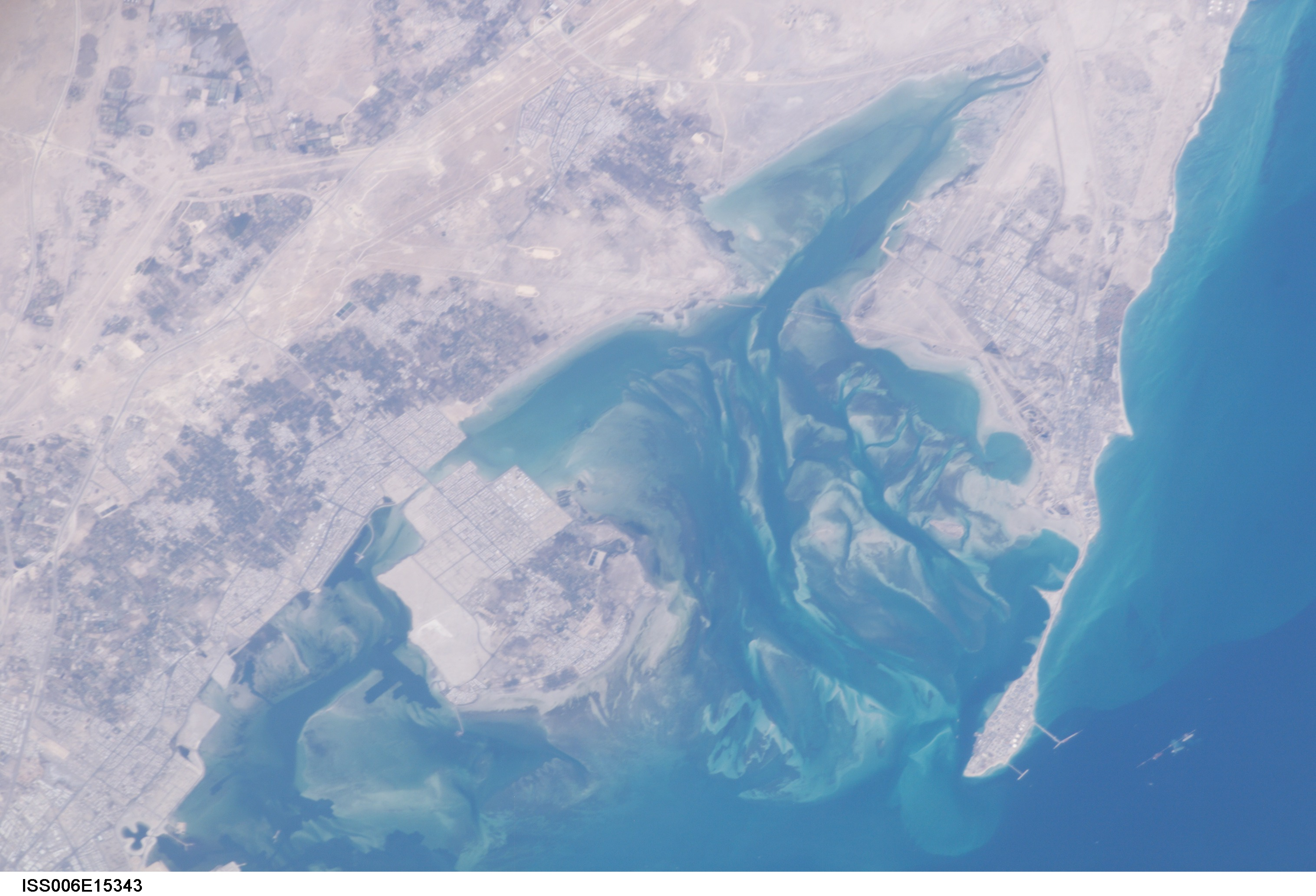

- Location within Saudi Arabia Location within Persian Gulf
- Coordinates: 26°35′N 49°59′E
- Country: Saudi Arabia
- Province: Eastern Province
- Governorate: Qatif Governorate

Population
  - Estimate (2022): 26,276
- Time zone: UTC+03:00 (SAST)

Al-Awamia, also spelled Al-Awamiyah, (Arabic: العوامية al-ʿAwāmiyyah) is a town in the Qatif Governorate, located in the Eastern Province of Saudi Arabia.

== Geography ==
Al-Awamia is an ancient town overlooking the Persian Gulf, located at the northern end of the Qatif oasis in Saudi Arabia. It lies within the Qatif Governorate, approximately 2.1 kilometers south of Safwa City and about 1 kilometer north of Al-Qudaih. The town used to features a mangrove area.

Historically, Al-Awamia had direct access to the sea, but that coastline was buried due to land reclamation and urban development. The town also had several natural water springs (عيون ماء) that once supported agriculture and daily life, most of which have now disappeared.

One of Al-Awamia's neighborhoods is Zara, a historically significant site that served as the capital of the historic of Eastern Arabia during the early Islamic era. In recent years, more than half of Zara was removed to make way for a major road construction project.

Al-Awamia was formerly bordered by Ramis farms to the east, with other farmlands to the west and south. Most of these farms have been cleared due to urban expansion. To the north, the town is bordered by Safwa City, limiting its ability to expand and provide new housing. Consequently, many residents have moved to nearby areas, especially Nasera, which is now home to around 2,500 people living in 250 homes.

Al-Qudaih, located just south of Al-Awamia, is also part of the Qatif Governorate and shares deep historical and social connections with Al-Awamia, forming part of the larger network of communities in the region.

== History ==
Despite a ban on public demonstrations in Saudi Arabia, on 29 July 2006, a pro-Hezbollah march took place in Al-Awamiyah and al-Qatif, protesting against Israel’s military campaign against Lebanon. Further protests took place on 3 August of the same year and on 28 April 2009.

In March 2009, at least four people, including a minor, were arrested after taking part in rallies which were organized to protest the warrant for the arrest of Sheikh Nimr Baqir al-Nimr, a senior Shiite cleric and Imam of a mosque in Al-Awamiyah. He had criticised attacks against Shias traveling to the tomb of Muhammad.

On 5 April 2015, a security officer was killed during a raid on suspected government opponents. According to the government, at least four citizens were detained and weapons seized.

In January 2016, Saudi Arabia executed the prominent Shiite cleric Sheikh Nimr Baqir al-Nimr, who had called for pro-democracy demonstrations, along with forty-seven people accused of terrorism.

=== 2017 Siege ===
In May 2017, Al-Awamiyah was put under full siege by the Saudi military after violence broke out due to evictions. The government blamed the violence on terrorist activities. Reports indicate that between 10 and 25 people were killed from gunfire and shelling, including two infants.

Residents also reported soldiers shooting at homes, cars and everyone in streets. During the crackdown the Saudi government demolished several historical sites and many other buildings and houses in Qatif.

20,000 residents were forced to flee from their homes to survive. and the town was devastated by demolitions and fighting.

Redevelopment Project

Without consultation with local residents, a “redevelopment project” was launched in February 2018 by the governor of the Eastern Province. The main goal of the project is to enhance “security solution or the tracking of armed groups and sleeper cells”.

== Economy ==
Al-Awamiyah's economy is based mainly on petroleum production and agriculture.

=== Agriculture ===
The town is particularly famous and known for its tomatoes which are called Ramsi tomatoes after the name of the land it is grown in, Al Ramis.

=== Oil ===
Oil pipelines surround the village from the west and north sides along with several oil wells of which some are old and others newly drilled as part of Qatif Project. Over 2 million barrels of oil pass through the village each day on the way to the Ras Tanura terminal and refinery.

== Transportation ==
=== Airport ===
The town is served by the nearby King Fahd International Airport which is 25 minutes away with a distance of 30 km from the terminal to the town.

=== Highway ===
The town can be accessed via either two exits from Dhahran–Jubail Expressway; the Airport exit or Qatif's main entrance near Al-Awjam. By March 2019, a new highway connecting the city with its neighbouring area is planned to be launched.

== Religion ==
Nearly all of the residents of Al-Awamiyah practice Twelver Shia Islam.

== Famous people from al-Awamiyah ==
- Ali Mohammed Baqir al-Nimr, the nephew of Sheikh Nimr, was run over and arrested by Saudi authorities in 2012, and as of 15 February 2018, and faced a death sentence for the same accusations.
- Ayatollah Nimr al-Nimr was executed on January 2, 2016, by the Saudi regime for his calls for democratic change.
