= Hasan al-Saffar =

Muslim leader

Personal life
- Born: 1958 (age 67–68) Qatif, Saudi Arabia
- Main interest(s): Pan-Islamism

Religious life
- Religion: Islam
- Denomination: Shia
- Jurisprudence: Ja'fari (Usuli)
- Creed: Twelver
- Movement: Shirazi
- Website: Official Website

Sheikh Hassan al-Saffar (Arabic: الشيخ حسن الصفار, born 1958) is a Shi'a scholar from Qatif, Saudi Arabia. He is considered one of the most important Shi'a leaders in Saudi Arabia. He established the Shi'a Islamic Reform Movement in the early 1990s, which sought to improve the relations between the Shi'a and the ruling family. On 23 October 2009, The Royal Islamic Strategic Studies Centre mentioned him as one of the 500 most influential Muslims in the world."
