= Protestantism in Saudi Arabia =

Protestantism is a minority faith but the more fervent with front in overwhelmingly Muslim Saudi Arabia.

In 2020, adherents of Protestantism were estimated to make up of 0.7% of the population.

In 2022, the number of Christians living in Saudi Arabia was estimated at 2.1 million; however, it is unknown how many are Protestants, Catholics or Orthodox. Other estimates put the number of Christians at over 2 million.

Saudi Arabia allows Christians to enter the country as foreign workers for temporary work, but does not allow them to practice their faith openly. In 2010, the percentage of Saudi Arabian citizens who were Christians is officially zero, as Saudi Arabia forbids religious conversion from Islam (apostasy) and it is punishable by death. As such, the official government position is that all Christians in the Kingdom are foreign workers.

Public practice of Christian religion is prohibited. However, there are cases in which a Muslim will adopt the Protestant Christian faith, secretly declaring his/her faith. In effect, they are practising Protestants, but legally Muslims. A 2015 study estimates some 60,000 believers in Christ from a Muslim background. Most of these subscribe to some form of evangelical or charismatic Christianity.

In 2018, it was reported that the religious police had stopped enforcing the ban on Christians religious services in the Kingdom either publicly or privately. It was also reported that a Coptic Mass was openly conducted for the first time, 102 years after that the Protestant. This was held in Riyadh during the visit of Ava Morkos, Coptic Bishop of Shobra Al-Kheima in Egypt. Morkos was originally invited to Saudi Arabia by Crown Prince Mohammad bin Salman in March 2018.

In 2023, the Open Doors World Watch List ranked Saudi Arabia as the 13th most difficult country to be a Christian.

== See also ==
- Religion in Saudi Arabia
- Christianity in Saudi Arabia
- Roman Catholicism in Saudi Arabia
- Eastern Orthodoxy in Saudi Arabia
