= Eastern Orthodoxy in Saudi Arabia =

Eastern Orthodoxy in Saudi Arabia is a Christian minority consisting of people of various nationalities that are adherents of the Eastern Orthodox Church.

The percentage of Saudi Arabian citizens who are Christians is officially zero. The Saudi Arabian Mutaween (Arabic: مطوعين), or Committee for the Promotion of Virtue and the Prevention of Vice (i.e., the religious police) prohibits the practice of any religion other than Islam. The Greek Orthodox have some numerical strength. Major nationalities in Saudi Arabia include Egyptians, Syrians, Palestinians and Lebanese.

In 2018, it was reported that the religious police had stopped enforcing the ban on Christian's religious services.

== See also ==
- Christianity in Saudi Arabia
- Oriental Orthodoxy in Saudi Arabia
- Roman Catholicism in Saudi Arabia
- Protestantism in Saudi Arabia
- Human rights in Saudi Arabia
- Freedom of religion in Saudi Arabia
- Christianity in the Middle East
- Christianity in Eastern Arabia
- Arab Christians
