= Oriental Orthodoxy in Saudi Arabia =

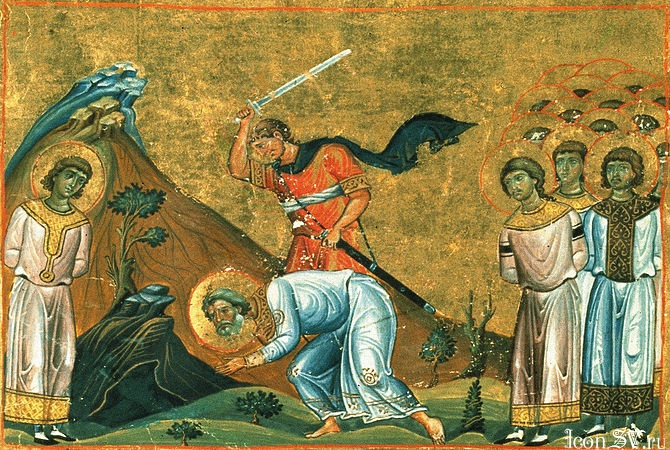
Saint Arethas, martyr and leader of the Najran Christian community in the early 6th century

Oriental Orthodoxy (Arabic: الأرثوذكسية الشرقية) first arrived in the Arabian Peninsula including areas comprising modern day Saudi Arabia during the apostolic age of Christianity. While not recognised by the Saudi government today, Oriental Orthodox Christians are allowed to live in the kingdom for temporary work and residency.

There are sizeable communities of Ethiopians, Eritreans, Syrians, and Egyptians in the kingdom, significant portions of whom include Orthodox Christians. As of date, there are no active Oriental Orthodox churches in Saudi Arabia. However, the kingdom is under the jurisdiction of the Coptic diocese of the Gulf countries.

Saudi Arabia allows Orthodox Christians and Christians of other denominations to enter the country as foreign workers for temporary work and residency, but they are not allowed to practise their faith openly. As a result of this, Christians generally worship in secret within their homes and communities. In most cases, Items such as memorabilia or articles belonging to other religious groups, including those belonging to Orthodox Christians, are not prohibited from being brought into the country, as long as they're for private use.

== History ==
Christians had formed churches in Arabia prior to the rise of Muhammad in the 7th century. Ancient Arab traders often traveled to Jerusalem for trade purposes and had heard the gospel from Saint Peter (Acts 2:11). Additionally, Paul the Apostle spent several years in Arabia (Galatians 1:17), later further strengthened by the ministry of Saint Thomas who went to Arabia, Mesopotamia, Persia and later to the Indian subcontinent. Najran emerged as a hub for Miaphysite Christians and was home to a substantial community. Known figures of the time included Quss Ibn Sa'ida al-Iyadi, a bishop from the city. However, other tribes and regions within Arabia also had Miaphysite communities such as the Banu Taghlib, Banu Tamim, and as well as the Ghassanids who were well known for their patronage towards the faith.

Historically, Saudi Arabia has maintained strict regulations regarding the public practise of religions other than Islam. The construction of churches and public worship services are prohibited, and non-Muslim religious gatherings have often been conducted in private residences. Government entities such as Committee for the Promotion of Virtue and the Prevention of Vice actively enforced these restrictions over the years, although its powers were significantly curtailed in April 2016. However, non-Muslims are allowed to enter and live in the country under various temporary and permanent residence schemes.

== Recent developments ==
Starting in 2017 when Mohammed bin Salman became the Crown Prince of the Kingdom, a series of social end economic reforms followed which led to a decrease in legal hostility towards Christians in the country. These reforms included the curtailing of Wahhabi influence within the country and the powers of the Mutaween. This period also marked growing relationships between the kingdom and the Coptic Church as well as between neighbouring countries such as Ethiopia which are Orthodox in majority and host a large expatriate community in the kingdom.

In 2018, it was reported that the religious police had stopped enforcing the ban on Christian religious services. It was also reported that a Coptic Mass was openly conducted for the first time in Riyadh during the visit of Ava Morkos, Coptic Bishop of Shobra Al-Kheima in Egypt. Morkos was originally invited to Saudi Arabia by Crown Prince Mohammad bin Salman in March 2018.

Later in 2023, Mass was openly held in Saudi Arabia for the first time under Bishop Ava Morkos with the permission of the kingdom's authorities, marking the first time that a Christian service was held publicly in the kingdom. Morkos conducted open services throughout various cities in the kingdom, marking the first of its kind and a milestone for the Oriental Orthodox communities within the country.

Following a surprising visit made by Bin Salman to Saint Mark's Coptic Orthodox Cathedral in Cairo, Pope Tawadros II praised the social reforms led by Bin Salman, thanking him for the treatment of Copts in the kingdom. Bin Salman reportedly invited the Pope to the kingdom as well.

== See also ==
- Arab Christians
- Oriental Orthodox Churches
- Oriental Orthodoxy in Iraq
- Oriental Orthodoxy by country
- Roman Catholicism in Saudi Arabia
- Eastern Orthodoxy in Saudi Arabia
- Freedom of religion in Saudi Arabia
- Christianity in Saudi Arabia
