= Christianity in Saudi Arabia =

Accurate religious demographics are difficult to obtain in Saudi Arabia, but there were approximately 2.1 million Christians in Saudi Arabia in 2020.

== Early history ==
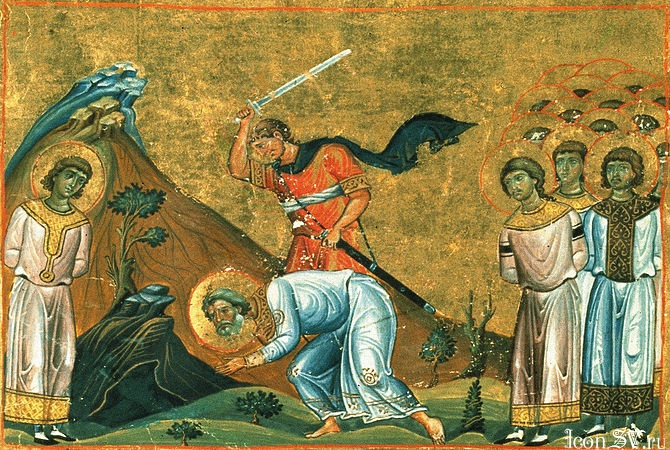
Saint Arethas, martyr and leader of the Najran Christian community in the early 6th century

Christians had formed churches in Arabia prior to the time of Muhammad in the 7th century. Ancient Arab traders had traveled to Jerusalem for trade purposes and heard the gospel from Saint Peter (Acts 2:11) and Paul the Apostle spent several years in Arabia (Galatians 1:17), later further strengthened by the ministry of Saint Thomas who went to Arabia, Mesopotamia, Persia and later to the Indian subcontinent.

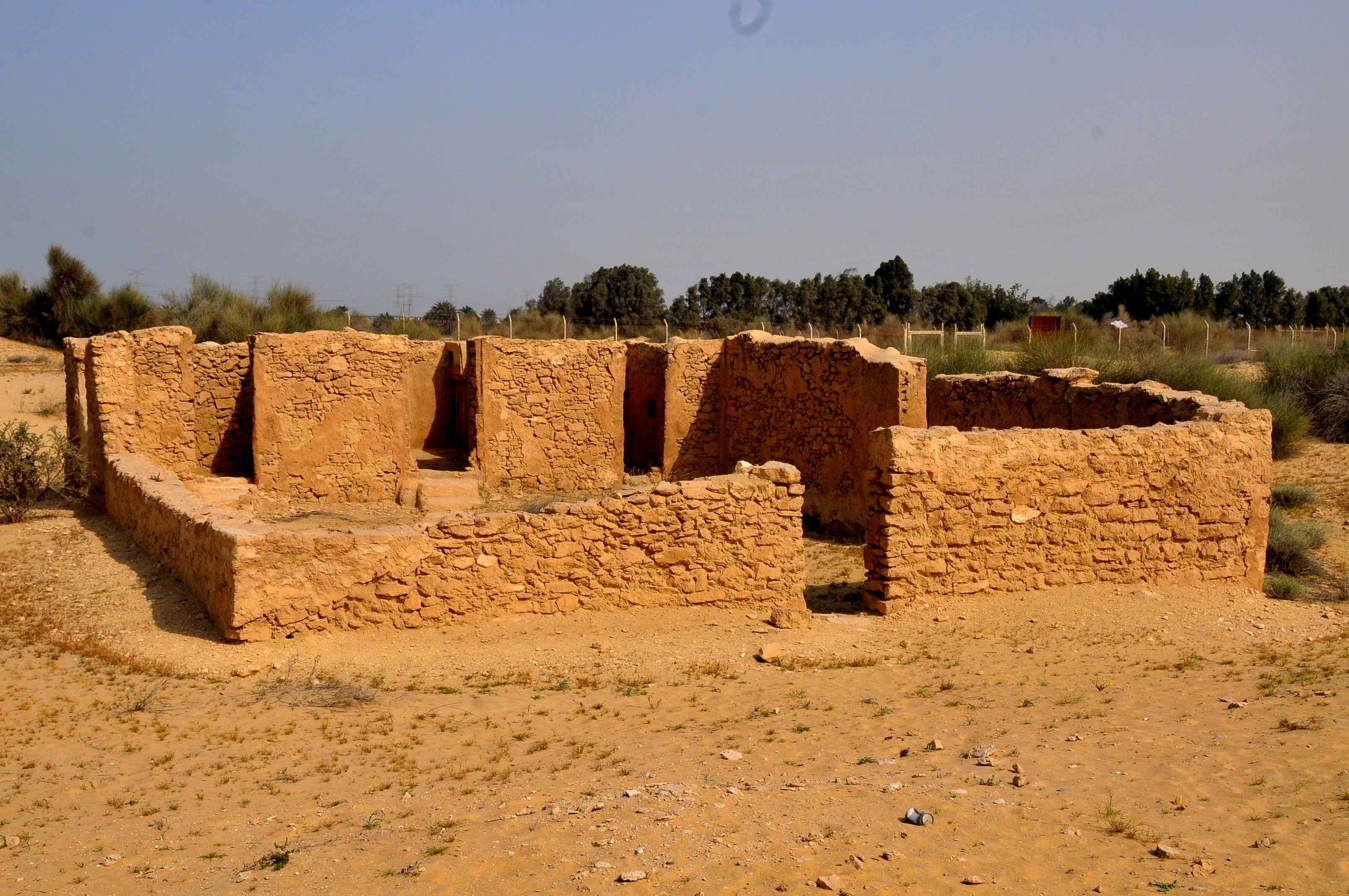
Jubail Church

One of the earliest church buildings ever, known as Jubail Church, is located in Saudi Arabia; it was built around the 4th century.

Some parts of modern Saudi Arabia (such as Najran) were predominantly Christian until the 7th to 10th century, when most Christians were expelled or converted to Islam or left the region via the Sea route to Asia, with which merchant trade already existed, others migrated north to Jordan and Syria and settled into those new places. Some Arab Christians who remained lived as crypto-Christians, or secret Christians. Some Arabian tribes, such as Banu Taghlib and Banu Tamim, followed Christianity.

Ancient Arabian Christianity has largely vanished from the region, due to persecution, conversion and migration.

== Persecution ==
=== Pre-Islamic ===
Dhu Nuwas, a Jewish king of Himyar, after seizing the throne of the Ḥimyarites around 518 or 522, attacked Christian Najran and its inhabitants, captured them and, burned their churches. The destruction fell out on Tuesday, during the 15th day of the lunar month Tishri, in the year 835 of the Seleucid era counting (corresponding with year 524 CE). After accepting the city's capitulation, he massacred its inhabitants who would not renounce Christianity. Earlier, the Himyarite monarch had attacked and killed the Abyssinian Christians who had settled in Zafar.

=== Modern ===
On June 15, 1858, 21 Christian residents of Jeddah, then an Ottoman town of 5,000 predominantly Muslim inhabitants, were massacred, including the French and British consuls, by "some hundreds of Al-Harbi clan, inhabitants of Southern Arabia". Twenty-four others, mostly Greeks and Levantines, some "under British protection" plus the daughter of the French consul and the French interpreter, both badly wounded, escaped and took refuge, some by swimming to it, aboard the ship HMS Cyclops.

International Christian Concern (ICC) protested what it reported as the 2001 detention of 11 Christians in Saudi Arabia, for practicing their religion in their homes. In June 2004, at least 46 Christians were arrested in what the ICC described as a "pogrom-like" action by Saudi police. The arrests took place shortly after the media reported that a Quran had been desecrated in the Guantanamo Bay detention camp.

== Community today ==
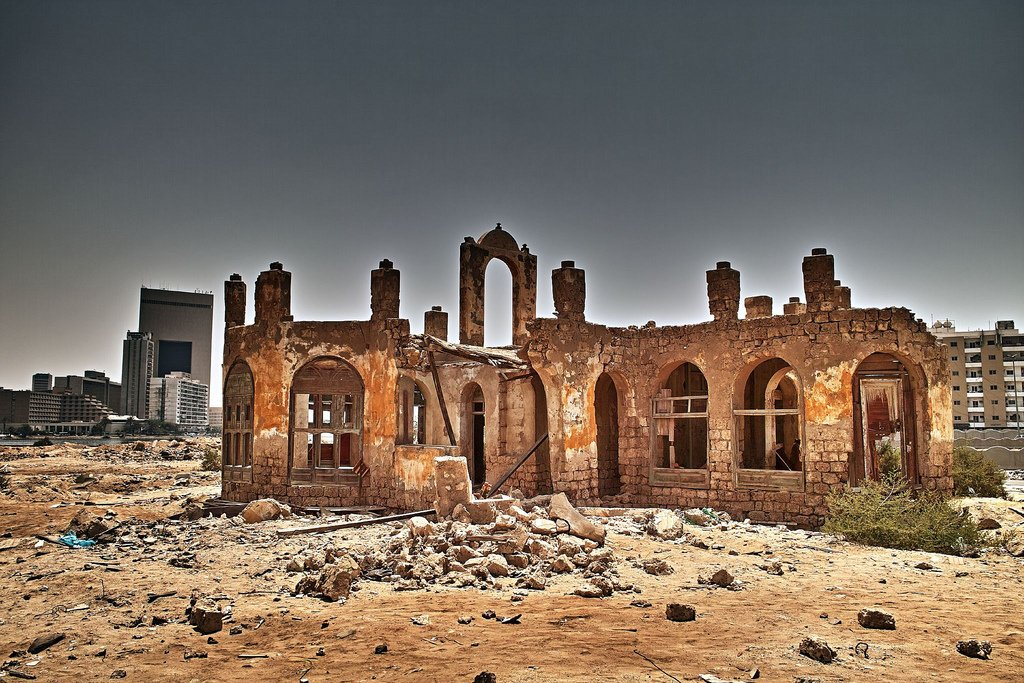
Old Dutch Christian church ruins in Jeddah

There are more than 500,000 Catholics in Saudi Arabia. Most of them are expatriate Filipinos who work there, but are not Saudi Arabian citizens. As of 2008, about 90% of the roughly 1.2 million Filipinos are Christians. In the same year there were also Christians from Canada, the United States, New Zealand, Spain, Australia, Italy, Greece, South Korea, Ireland, the United Kingdom, India, China, Pakistan, Bangladesh, Sri Lanka, Ethiopia, Kenya, Lebanon, Syria, Egypt and as well a number of Christians from sub-Saharan countries who are working in the Saudi Kingdom.

Saudi Arabia allows Christians to enter the country as foreign workers for work or tourism, but does not allow them to practice their faith openly. Saudi Arabia states that they are permitted to privately practice their religion, but this is not codified and raids on private practice by the Committee for the Promotion of Virtue and Prevention of Vice do occur, though these have decreased since their powers were curtailed in 2016. Bringing a Bible and other types of religious texts into the country is allowed as long as it is for personal use.

Although textbooks in Saudi Arabia have moderated their extremist content since 2001, they still contain some content classified as "egregious" such as characterizing Christians and other non-Muslims as liars and are considered to promote religious hatred and intolerance towards non-Muslims, while the NGO Human Rights Watch has also reported rising hate speech against Christians by Saudi leaders.

The Saudi Arabian Mutaween (Arabic: مطوعين), or Committee for the Promotion of Virtue and the Prevention of Vice (i.e., the religious police) prohibits the public practice of any religion other than Islam. Conversion of a Muslim to another religion is considered apostasy, a crime punishable by death if the accused does not recant. There have been no confirmed reports of executions for either crime in modern times. The government permits non-Muslim clergy to enter the country for the purpose of conducting religious services. In spite of this, a 2015 study estimates that there are some 60,000 Christians with a Muslim background living in the country, though that does not mean that all of those are citizens of the country.

There are also Christian communities on expatriate compounds, including Catholic services in the Aramco compound in Dhahran.

Currently there are no official churches in Saudi Arabia. According to the Society of Architectural Heritage Protection Jeddah and the Municipality of Jeddah, a long-abandoned house in Al-Baghdadiyya district has never been an Anglican church, contrary to the "'myth' that had spread on the Internet". However, in 1930 there was a non-Muslim cemetery in Jeddah.

Discovered in 1986, the church ruins at Jubail originally belonged to the Church of the East, a branch of Eastern Christianity in the Middle East. The government has placed a fence around the church to prevent potential tourists from entering. However, the fences have not stopped locals from coming in to vandalise and damage the building.

In 2018, Saudi Arabia had its first public Divine Liturgy celebrated by clergy of the Coptic church.

In 2022, the taboo around Christmas trees lightened, allowing for open sales and decorations.

== Demographics ==
According to Pew Research Center, the percentage of Christians in Saudi Arabia in 2018 constituted 4.4% of the country's population. However, the percentage of Saudi Arabian citizens who are Christians is zero de jure, as Saudi Arabia forbids religious conversion from Islam and punishes it by death.

In 2022, the number of Christians living in Saudi Arabia was estimated at 2.1 million; however, it was unknown how many are Protestants, Catholics or Orthodox Other estimates put this at over 2 million.

== Freedom of religion ==
In 2023, the Open Doors World Watch List ranked Saudi Arabia as the 13th most difficult country to be a Christian or any type of non-Muslim.

== See also ==
- Catholic Church in Saudi Arabia
- Eastern Orthodox Christianity in Saudi Arabia
- Oriental Orthodoxy in Saudi Arabia
- Protestantism in Saudi Arabia
- Freedom of religion in Saudi Arabia
- Human rights in Saudi Arabia
- Non–Muslim Cemetery
