= Religion in Saudi Arabia =

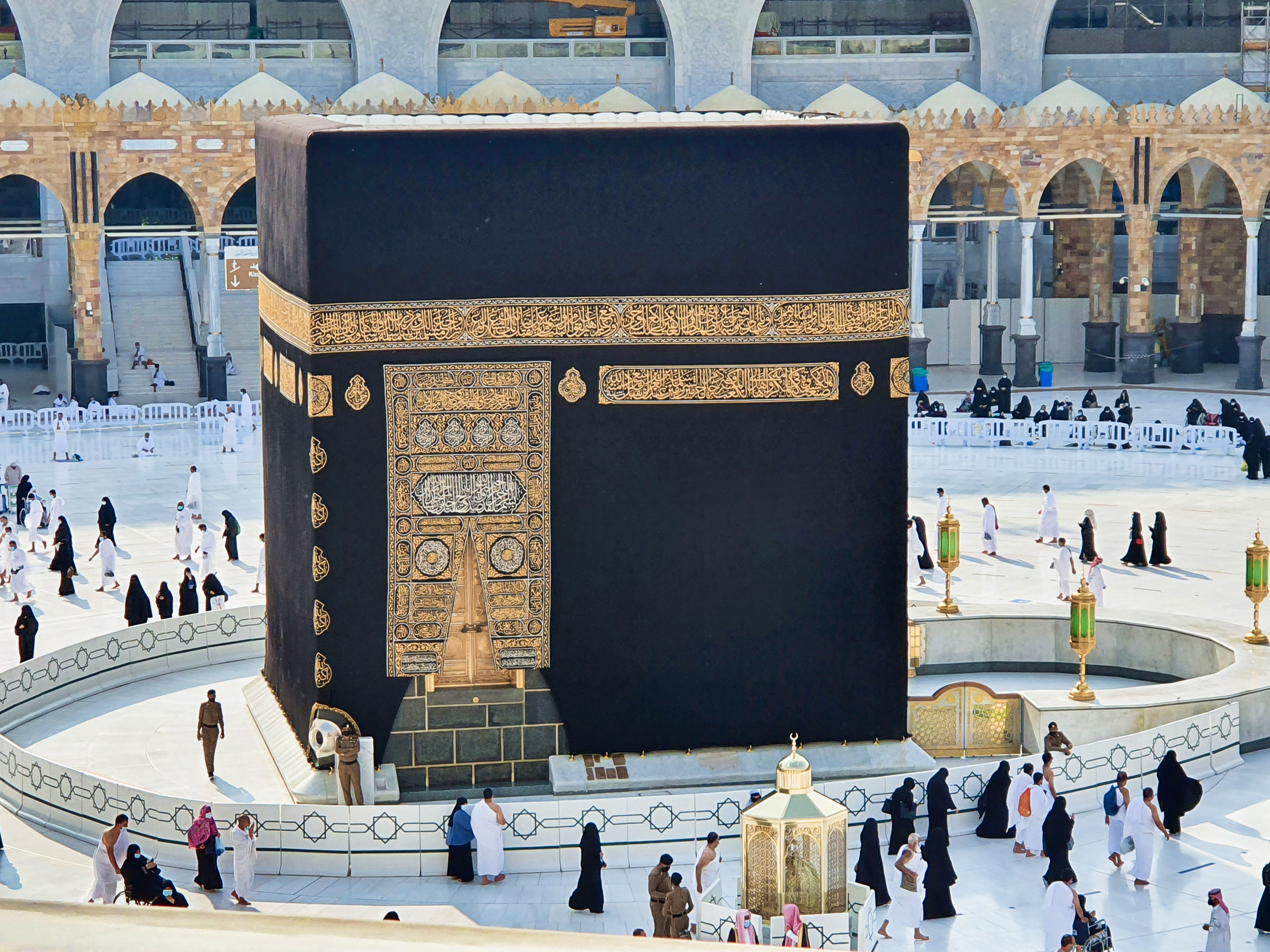
The Kaaba in Mecca is the holiest site of Islam, the state religion of Saudi Arabia.

Islam is the state religion of Saudi Arabia. As the "home of Islam" where the prophet of Islam lived and carried out his mission, the kingdom attracts millions of Muslim Hajj pilgrims annually, and thousands of clerics and students who come from across the Muslim world to study. Majority of its citizens are Muslim, including most of the population of foreign workers as well. Hanbali is the official version of Sunni Islam and it is used in the legal and education systems. The Basic Law of Saudi Arabia states that it is the duty of every citizen to defend Islam.

Religion in Saudi Arabia has had a reach beyond its borders as since the 1970s the Saudi government has spent tens of billions of dollars of its petroleum export revenue throughout the Islamic world and elsewhere promoting Islam and specifically the strict revivalist Salafi school based on the teachings of Muhammad ibn Abd al-Wahhab, known as Wahhabism. However in 2017, Crown Prince Mohammed bin Salman, eliminated many Wahhabi restrictions (bans on amusement parks, cinemas, driving of motor vehicles by women, etc.), though not government controls on religious expression.

The government places restrictions on religious freedom. Foreigners attempting to acquire Saudi Arabian nationality must either already be Muslim or convert to Islam. Proselytizing/promotion of any non-Islamic religion is forbidden per a 2022 law.

Religion in Saudi Arabia (Pew Research Center 2020 est.)
1. Islam (92.7%)
2. Christianity (4.40%)
3. Hinduism (2.60%)
4. Other (1.00%)

== Islam ==
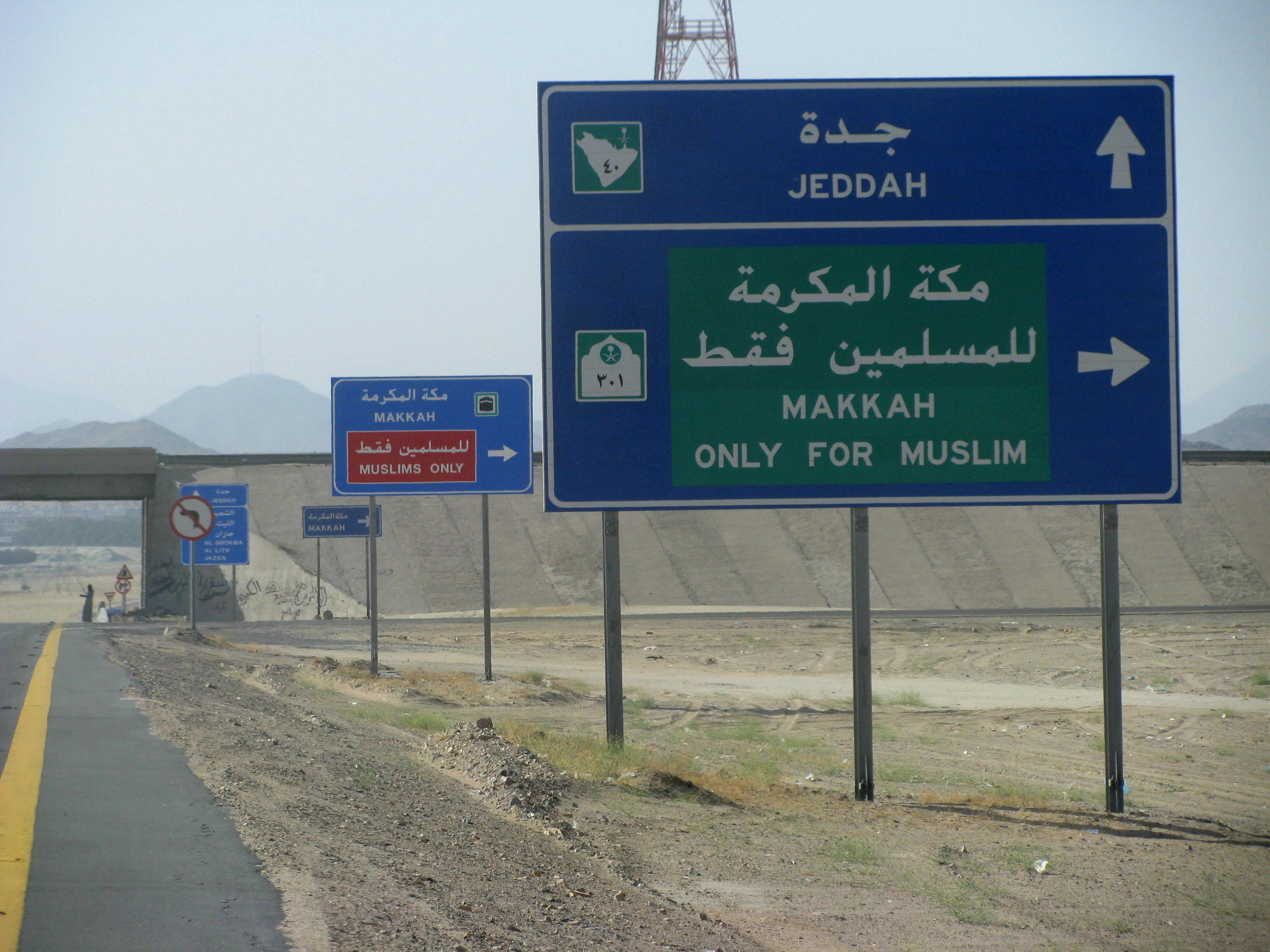
Non-Muslims are barred from entering the holy city of Mecca and parts of the holy city of Medina.

Islam, specifically Sunni Islam of the Hanbali school, is the state religion in Saudi Arabia. According to official statistics, in 2022 90% of Saudi Arabia's 15 to 20 million citizens were Sunni Muslims, 10-12% are Shia, many Twelver Shia populating the eastern regions and Zaydi Shia in the south of the country. More than 30% of the population was made up of foreign workers who are predominantly but not entirely Muslim.

According to a number of sources, only a minority of Saudis consider themselves Wahhabis, although according to other sources, the Wahhabi affiliation is up to 40%, making it a very dominant minority, at the very least using a native population of 17 million based on "2008–09 estimates". A 2014 survey found that 97% of the young Saudis consider Islam "as the main influence that shapes their identity."

Public worship and proselytising by non-Muslims, including the distribution of non-Muslim religious materials (such as the Bible), is illegal in Saudi Arabia. Non-Muslim foreigners attempting to acquire Saudi Arabian nationality must convert to Islam.

The kingdom is called the "home of Islam"; it is where Prophet Muhammad lived and died, and united and ruled the Arabian Peninsula, and the location of the cities of Mecca and Medina, now the two holiest cities of Islam, (the official title of the King of Saudi Arabia is "Custodian of the Two Holy Mosques"—the two being in Mecca and Medina.) Non-Muslims are forbidden from entering the holy cities, (although some Western non-Muslims have been able to enter, disguised as Muslims). The kingdom attracts millions of Muslim Hajj pilgrims annually, and thousands of clerics and students who come from across the Muslim world to study.

=== History ===
In the 18th century, a pact between Islamic preacher Muhammad ibn Abd al-Wahhab and a regional emir, Muhammad bin Saud, brought a revival of Islam (Salafism - that is, following the Quran and Sunnah in light of the interpretation of ‘As Salaf As Salih’) of Sunni Islam first to the Najd region and then to the Arabian Peninsula. Referred to by supporters as "Salafism" and by others as "Wahhabism", this interpretation of Islam became the state religion and interpretation of Islam espoused by Muhammad bin Saud and his successors (the Al Saud family), who eventually created the modern kingdom of Saudi Arabia in 1932. The Saudi government has spent tens of billions of dollars of its petroleum export revenue throughout the Islamic world and elsewhere on building mosques, publishing books, giving scholarships and fellowships, hosting international Islamic organisations, and promoting its form of Islam, sometimes referred to as "petro-Islam".

The mission to call to Islam the way the Salaf practiced it has been dominant in Najd for two hundred years, but in most other parts of the country—Hejaz, the Eastern Province, Najran—it has dominated only since 1913–1925.

Starting in late 2017, under Crown Prince Mohammed bin Salman, dramatic changes have been made in religious policy, including the elimination of the power of the religious police, the lifting of bans on amusement parks, cinemas, concert venues, and driving of motor vehicles by women.

=== Shi'ism ===
An estimated 5–10% of citizens in Saudi Arabia are Shia Muslims, most of whom are adherents to Twelver Shia Islam. Twelvers are predominantly represented by the Baharna community living in the Eastern Province, with the largest concentrations in Qatif, and half the population in al-Hasa. In addition there is a small Twelver Shia minority in Medina (called the Nakhawila). Sizable Zaydi and Isma'ili communities also live in Najran along the border with Yemen.

According to Human Rights Watch, the Shia Muslim minority face systematic discrimination from the Saudi Arabian government in education, the justice system and especially religious freedom. Shias also face discrimination in employment and restrictions are imposed on the public celebration of Shia festivals such as Ashura and on the Shia taking part in communal public worship.

== Minor religions ==
=== Non-Muslims ===
In 2022, the kingdom's total population was approximately 35 million; it was estimated that of these, over one-third were foreign workers. Foreign workers applying for visas are informed that they have the right to worship privately and to possess personal religious items; however, there is no freedom of religion in the legal system, and there are reports of non-Sunnis and non-Muslims being arrested and found guilty of religious crimes.

As no faith other than Islam is permitted to be practiced openly, no churches, synagogues, temples, gurudwaras, shrines, kingdom halls, or other non-Muslim houses of worship are permitted in the country although there were nearly three million Christians, Hindus, Buddhists and Sikhs in 2022. Foreign workers are not allowed to celebrate Christmas or Easter; private prayer services are suppressed, and the Saudi religious police reportedly regularly search the homes of Christians. In 2007, Human Rights Watch requested that King Abdullah stop a campaign to round up and deport foreign followers of the Ahmadiyya faith.

Proselytizing by non-Muslims is illegal and conversion by Muslims to another religion (apostasy) carries the death penalty, though there have been no confirmed reports of executions for apostasy. Religious inequality extends to compensation awards in court cases. Once fault is determined, a Muslim receives the full amount of compensation determined, a Jew or Christian half, and all others a sixteenth.

The classical Arabic historians tell us that in the year 20 after the hijra (Muhammad's move from Mecca to Medina), corresponding to 641 of the Christian calendar, the Caliph Umar decreed that Jews and Christians should be removed from Arabia to fulfill an injunction Muhammad uttered on his deathbed: "Let there not be two religions in Arabia." The people in question were the Jews of the oasis of Khaybar in the north and the Christians of Najran in the south.

[The hadith] was generally accepted as authentic, and Umar put it into effect. Compared with European expulsions, Umar's decree was both limited and compassionate. It did not include southern and southeastern Arabia, which were not seen as part of Islam's holy land. ... the Jews and Christians of Arabia were resettled on lands assigned to them – the Jews in Syria, the Christians in Iraq. The process was also gradual rather than sudden, and there are reports of Jews and Christians remaining in Khaybar and Najran for some time after Umar's edict.

But the decree was final and irreversible, and from then until now the holy land of the Hijaz has been forbidden territory for non-Muslims. According to the Hanbali school of Islamic jurisprudence, accepted by both the Saudi Arabians and the declaration's signatories, for a non-Muslim even to set foot on the sacred soil is a major offense. In the rest of the kingdom, non-Muslims, while admitted as temporary visitors, were not permitted to establish residence or practice their religion.

While Saudi Arabia does allow non-Muslims to live in Saudi Arabia to work, they may not practice religion publicly. According to the government of the United Kingdom:

The public practice of any form of religion other than Islam is illegal; as is an intention to convert others. However, the Saudi Arabian authorities accept the private practice of religions other than Islam, and you can bring a religious text into the country as long as it is for your personal use. Importing larger quantities than this can carry severe penalties.

==== Christianity ====
Estimates of the number of Christians in Saudi Arabia range from 1,500,000 to 2,100,000. As converting from Islam is illegal, the official government position is that all Christians in the Kingdom are foreign workers.

Christians have complained of religious persecution by authorities. In one case in December 2012, 35 Ethiopian Christians working in Jeddah (six men and 29 women who held a weekly evangelical prayer meeting) were arrested and detained by the kingdom’s religious police for holding a private prayer gathering. While the official charge was “mixing with the opposite sex” - a crime for unrelated people in Saudi Arabia - the offenders complained they were arrested for praying as Christians. A 2006 report in Asia News states that there are "at least one million" Roman Catholics in the kingdom. It states that they are being "denied pastoral care ... Catechism for their children - nearly 100,000 - is banned." It reports the arrest of a Catholic priest for saying mass in 2006. "Fr. George [Joshua] had just celebrated mass in a private house when seven religious policemen (muttawa) broke into the house together with two ordinary policemen. The police arrested the priest and another person."

According to the Middle East editor of The Economist magazine, Nicolas Pelham, the kingdom contains "perhaps the largest and fastest-growing Christian community in the Middle East" and strict religious laws - such as banning Christians from Mecca and Medina - are not always enforced:

Though Christians are forbidden from worshiping publicly, congregations at weekly prayer meetings on foreign compounds can be several hundred strong.

In 2018, it was reported that the religious police had stopped enforcing the ban on Christians religious services anywhere in the Kingdom whether publicly or privately, and for the first time, a "documented Christian service" was openly conducted. Sometime before 1 December 2018, a Coptic Mass was performed in the city of Riyadh by Ava Morkos, Coptic Bishop of Shobra Al-Kheima in Egypt, during his visit to Saudi Arabia (according to Egyptian and other Arab media). Ava Morkos was originally invited to Saudi Arabia by Crown Prince Mohammad bin Salman in March 2018.

==== Hinduism ====
As of 2001, there were an estimated 1,500,000 Indian nationals in Saudi Arabia, most of them Muslims, but some Hindus. In 2022, the estimate was 708,000 Hindus. Like other non-Muslim religions, Hindus are not permitted to worship publicly in Saudi Arabia.

== Irreligion ==
Disbelief in God is a capital offense in the kingdom. Traditionally, influential conservative clerics have used the label ‘atheist’ to apply not to those who profess to believe that God does not exist, but to "those who question their strict interpretations of Islamic scriptures or express doubts about the dominant version of Islam known as Wahhabism". Examples of those so condemned (but not executed) include:

- Hamza Kashgari, who was jailed for 20 months after tweeting some unconventional thoughts about Muhammad, "none of which indicated he did not believe in God".
- Raif Badawi (editor of the Free Saudi Liberals website), who was sentenced to 1000 lashes, ten years in prison and fined 1 million riyal (equal to about $267,000) in 2014 after he was convicted of insulting Islam on his website and on television. The original 2013 sentence was seven years and 600 lashes, but was changed on appeal.

In February / March 2014, a series of new anti-terrorism laws were decreed. Article 1 of the law also conflated atheism and religious dissent, outlawing "calling for atheist thought in any form, or calling into question the fundamentals of the Islamic religion on which this country is based".

According to "anecdotal, but persistent" evidence, since sometime around 2010, the number of atheists in the kingdom has been growing. News agencies such as Alhurra, Saurress and the American performance-management consulting company Gallup.

According to a 2014 report, a commission set up by the Committee for the Promotion of Virtue and the Prevention of Vice In its report, the commission said that it got over 9,341 complaints about pornographic sites in one year. It also received over 2,734 reports about sites that promoted atheism and misleading information about religion. A government official announced in that same year that 850 websites and social media pages espousing views deemed to be "atheistic" in nature have been blocked in the country over a span of 16 months.

== Freedom of religion ==
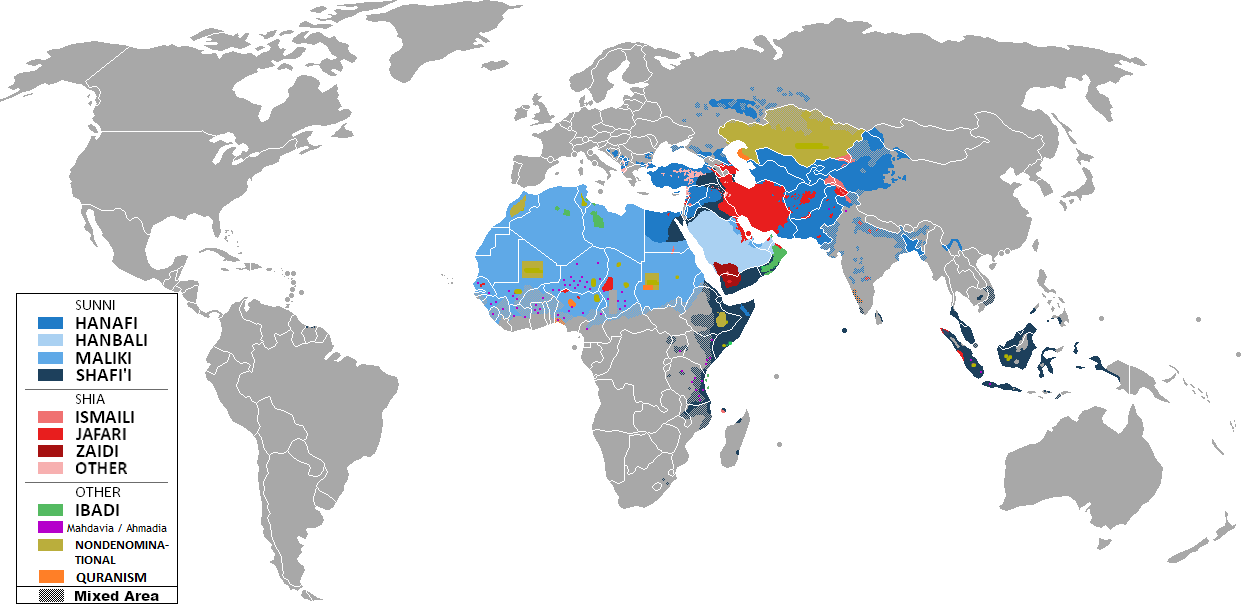
Saudi Arabia mostly colored in light blue (Sunni hanbali).

Saudi Arabia is an Islamic theocracy. Religious minorities do not have the right to practice their religion openly. Conversion from Islam to another religion is punishable by death as apostasy. Proselytizing by non-Muslims, including the distribution of non-Muslim religious materials such as Bibles, Bhagavad Gita, Torot and Ahmadi books is illegal. In late 2014, a law was promulgated calling for the death penalty for anyone bringing into the country "publications that have a prejudice to any other religious beliefs other than Islam" (thought to include non-Muslim religious books).

The 2019 annual report of the United States Commission on International Religious Freedom (USCIRF) noted that Saudi Arabia was seen as one of 16 “countries of particular concern” for engaging in or tolerating “systematic, ongoing, egregious violations [of religious freedom]”. That status continues in 2022.

In 2023, the country was scored zero out of 4 for religious freedom. In the same year, it was ranked as the 13th worst place in the world to be a Christian by Open Doors, a Christian charity organization.

== See also ==
- International propagation of Salafism and Wahhabism
