= Blasphemy law in Saudi Arabia =

Saudi Arabia's laws are an amalgam of rules from Sharia (mainly the rules formulated by the Hanbali school of jurisprudence but also from other schools of law like the Ja'fari school), royal decrees, royal ordinances, other royal codes and bylaws, fatwas from the Council of Senior Scholars (Saudi Arabia) and custom and practice.

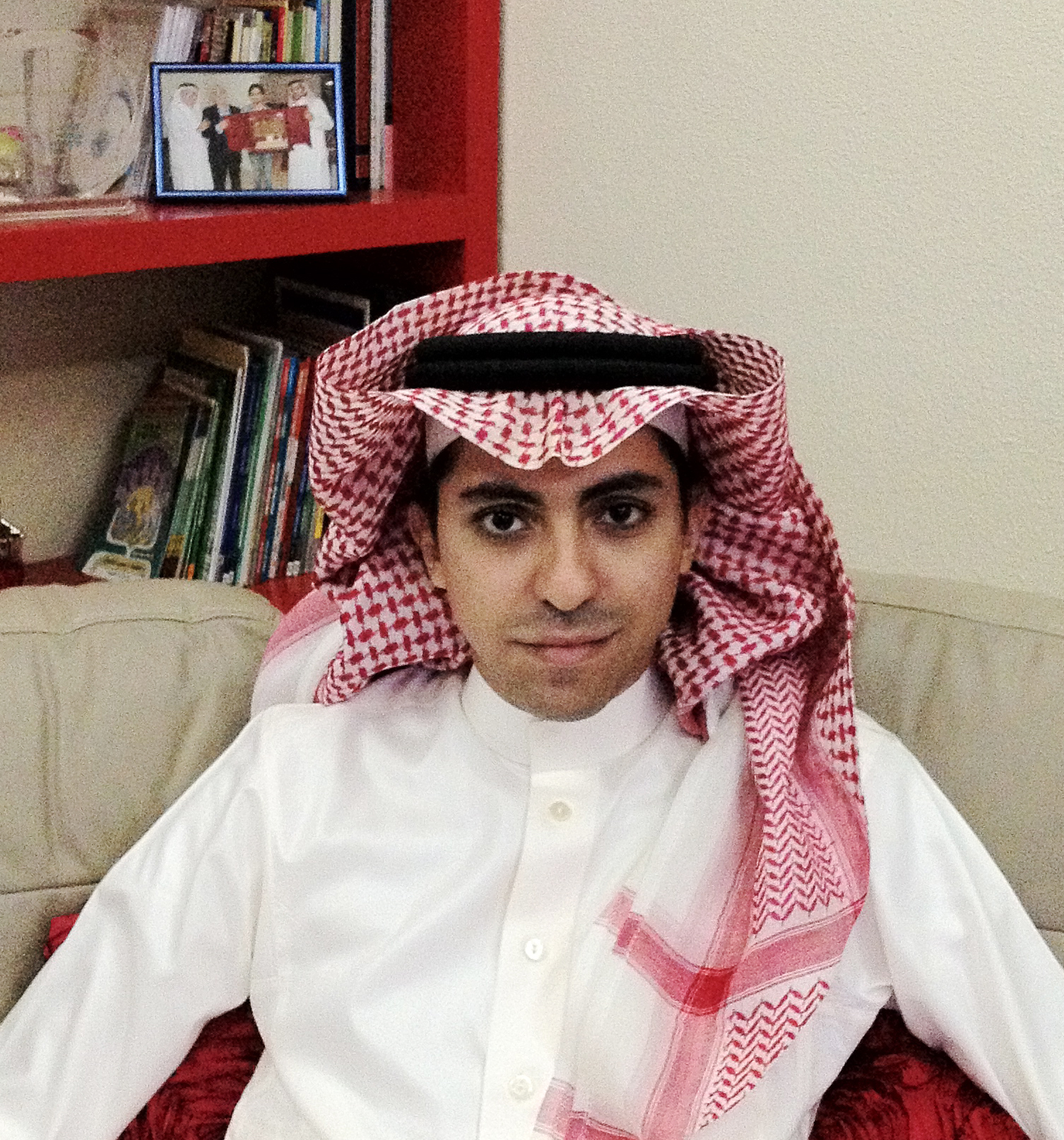
Saudi Arabian activist Raif Badawi was arrested for blasphemy.

== Repression ==
Saudi Arabian authorities use the kingdom's laws to repress all forms of public religious expression other than one school of Sunni Islam, namely, Salafism or Wahhabism. Numerous Ismaili Muslims are in prison on account of their religion, and many Shia Muslims are under arrest or in detention. The kingdom uses the Committee for the Promotion of Virtue and the Prevention of Vice (religious police) to enforce its laws against apostasy. The commission is composed in part of uncontrolled, zealous volunteers.

== Torture ==
To secure convictions, Saudi Arabia's administrative and judicial authorities routinely seek confessions. To secure confessions, the authorities commonly engage in severe violations of human rights. Persons accused of blasphemy may be subjected to torture or to cruel and degrading treatment as well as to prolonged and solitary detention. The proceedings which determine an accused's fate may be secret. Execution is usually by beheading with a sword for males and by firing squad for females.

== Selected cases ==
In 2009, Amnesty International reported that "at least 102 men and women, 39 of them foreign nationals, were executed in 2008. Many were executed for non-violent offences, including drug offences, 'sodomy', blasphemy and apostasy." In 2008, Human Rights Watch reported that Saudi Arabia frequently convicts persons for alleged insults to religion. In 1999, the Special Rapporteur of the United Nations Human Rights Commission expressed concern about the lack of response from Saudi Arabia to inquiries about the circumstances of detained persons.

In 2008 in Saudi Arabia, after Ra'if Badawi operated a website that criticized that country's religious police and questioned Wahhabi interpretations of Islam, authorities charged him with "setting up an electronic site that insults Islam". Faced with both the possibility of five years' imprisonment and an $800,000 fine, as well as threats against his safety, he fled the country.

On 13 June 2007, Sabri Bogday, a barber from Turkey, appeared at a General Court at Jeddah on a charge of blasphemy. Bogday confessed to "swearing at Allah." The Court (three judges) sentenced Bogday to death. Bogday appealed the verdict but his appeal was denied. He appealed to the Appeals Court but his appeal was denied. He appealed to the Supreme Judicial Court but his appeal was denied. He appealed to the Custodian of the Two Holy Mosques, King Abdullah. The king allowed the appeal upon Bogday's repentance and his plea to Allah for forgiveness. Bogday returned to Turkey on 27 January 2009.

In April 2006, Saudi authorities released Saudi journalist Rabah Al-Quwai, who wrote for the daily Shams. The authorities held Quwai for thirteen days because, by articles posted on the Internet three years earlier, he had warned that religious extremists in Saudi Arabia could be considering an attack on Riyadh. He had also criticized the strict religious interpretations of hard-line Wahabbi Islamists. Al-Quwai reported that the authorities compelled him to sign a statement saying that he had denigrated Islamic beliefs in his writing, that he was not a true Muslim, and that he would defend Islamic values in his future work.

In 2005, a Saudi sharia court found Dr. Hamza Al-Maziani, a linguistics professor at King Saud University, guilty of "mocking religion". One report says Al-Maziani had published an article lamenting the deteriorating quality of education at the university due to the influx of foreign Islamists. Another report says one of Al-Maziani's colleagues accused Al-Maziani of saying that the textbooks at the university were radical. The court sentenced Al-Maziani to four months in prison and 275 lashes. Crown Prince (later King) Abdullah commuted the sentence.

In 2005, a court in Bukairia found Muhammad Al-Harbi, a high school chemistry teacher, guilty of blasphemy for talking to students and teachers about Christianity, Judaism, and the causes of terrorism. The court sentenced al-Harbi to 40 months in prison and 750 lashes.

In March 2004, a General Court in Riyadh banned from teaching Muhammad Al-Sahimi (also Mohammad Al-Suhaimi), a teacher in middle school and high school. The court also sentenced Al-Sahimi to three years in prison and 300 lashes. The court found him guilty of endorsing un-Islamic sexual, social and religious practices. The government based its case upon Al-Sahimi's remarks to his students about the varying concepts of love in poetry. Religion-teachers at his school interpreted his words to constitute apostasy. Court documents charged Al-Sahimi with declaring listening to music, smoking, adultery, homosexuality, and masturbation as permissible under Islam. Al-Sahimi denied the charges.

In 2003, Saudi cleric Ali bin al-Khudayr accused Saudi journalist Mansur al-Nuqaydan of blasphemous crimes. The crimes included "secular humanism" and "scorn for religion, its rites, and devout people." Al-Khudayr said al-Nuqaydan committed the crimes by saying during an interview "we need an Islam reconciled with the other, an Islam that does not know hatred for others because of their beliefs or their inclinations. We need a new Reformation, a bold reinterpretation of the religious text so that we can reconcile ourselves with the world." On his website, al-Khudayr called for al-Nuqaydan to be killed. The authorities barred al-Nuqaydan from writing or traveling abroad.

In 1994, an Ismaili, Hadi Al-Mutaif (also Al-Mutif), a teenager, made a remark that a court deemed blasphemous. The court sentenced Al-Mutaif to death for apostasy. In May 2009, Al-Mutaif was still in prison. He has spent long periods of time in solitary confinement, and has made numerous suicide attempts.

On 3 September 1992, Sadiq 'Abdul-Karim Malallah was publicly beheaded by sabre in al-Qatif in Saudi Arabia's Eastern Province after being convicted of apostasy and blasphemy. Malallah, a Shia Muslim from Saudi Arabia, was arrested in April 1988 and charged with throwing stones at a police patrol. He was reportedly held in solitary confinement for long periods during his first months in detention and tortured prior to his first appearance before a judge in July 1988. The judge reportedly asked him to convert from Shia Islam to Sunni Islam, and allegedly promised him a lighter sentence if he complied. After he refused to do so, he was taken to al-Mabahith al-'Amma (General Intelligence) Prison in Dammam where he was held until April 1990. He was then transferred to al-Mabahith al-'Amma Prison in Riyadh, where he remained until the date of his execution. Malallah may have been involved in efforts to secure improved rights for Saudi Arabia's Shia Muslim minority.

In 1992, Saudi Arabia executed at least one juvenile for blasphemy.

== See also ==
- Apostasy in Islam
- Freedom of religion in Saudi Arabia
- Islam and blasphemy
- Sharia#Democracy and human rights
- Blasphemy law
