= Lawyers for Liberty =

Human rights organization

Lawyers for Liberty (LFL)
- Purpose: Human rights and law reform in Malaysia
- Location: Petaling Jaya, Selangor, Malaysia
- Method: "public campaigning, test case litigation and intervention, parliamentary lobbying", research, education
- Members: <10
- Key people: N. Surendran, Latheefa Koya, Eric Paulsen
- Employees: 4
- Volunteers: <10
- Website: lawyersforliberty.org

Lawyers for Liberty (LFL) is a Malaysian human rights and law reform NGO. In 2010 it revealed several years' statistics of lethal police shootings in Malaysia and inferred that police had impunity to murder. In 2011 it commented on the exchange of political refugees with Australia and alleged police harassment of journalists. In 2011 LFL criticised Malaysian authorities' arrest and deportation of the Saudi Hamza Kashgari, who had published three allegedly blasphemous tweets, and filed a habeas corpus affidavit against four Malaysian authorities. LFL claimed that it would try to obtain Kashgari's freedom.

== Aims ==
Lawyers for Liberty (LFL) has stated that the federal government of Malaysia and other Malaysian governmental authorities carry out "many unconstitutional, arbitrary and unreasonable decisions and acts". LFL claims to oppose these decisions and acts through "public campaigning, test case litigation and intervention, parliamentary lobbying", research, education.

== Structure and leadership ==
Lawyers for Liberty consists of volunteer lawyers and activists.

== Actions ==
In December 2010, Lawyers for Liberty published statistics of fatal police shootings in Malaysia from 2000 to 2009, reporting that there were typically five to 27 fatal shootings per year, with a maximum of 88 deaths in 2009 and a total of 279 over the decade defined as 2000–2009. LFL member N. Surendran interpreted the data as evidence for police lawlessness, stating, "They know they can commit murder without being called into account and that is a tremendous power to put in the hands of a human being to tell him that go ahead, commit murder, we will protect you."

In June 2011, LFL gave an interview with Radio Australia regarding a possible exchange of refugees between Malaysia and Australia. In August 2011, LFL criticised police questioning of an editor and journalist of the newspaper Suara Keadilan, associated with the People's Justice Party (PKR), and a member of the party, over an article appearing in the newspaper, as "baseless and a form of harassment".

=== Hamza Kashgari ===
In February 2012, a Saudi Arabian poet and journalist Hamza Kashgari, who had published three tweets of a would-be conversation with Muhammad, tried to leave Kuala Lumpur to seek political asylum in New Zealand in order to avoid apostasy or blasphemy charges and likely execution, and was detained by Malaysian authorities. LFL members attempted to contact Kashgari during his detention. They obtained a High Court injunction at about 13:30 to 13:45 on 12 February against him being deported back to Saudi Arabia. He was deported to Riyadh on the same day. Lawyers for Liberty checked immigration records at Sultan Abdul Aziz Shah Airport (Subang) and Kuala Lumpur International Airport, finding no record of [Kashgari's] deportation.

Lawyer K. Ragunath and several members of LFL filed a habeas corpus affidavit against the Inspector-General of Police, the Immigration Director-General, the Home Minister and the federal government of Malaysia, alleging that "they [had] been misled throughout Kashgari's arrest and deportation." Fadiah Nadwa Fikri of LFL referred to the authorities' initial claim of an Interpol request that was later denied, an incorrect claim of Kashgari's arrival date in Malaysia, and a claim that Kashgari had been deported "according to a 'lang-standing arrangement' [between] Malaysia and Saudi Arabia". Fadiah said that no such treaty or official documentation exists. LFL accused the Malaysian authorities of violating international law in their de facto deportation of Kashgari.

LFL stated that it would continue to campaign for Kashgari's release to prevent him from being executed for his three allegedly blasphemous tweets.

=== 2015 arrests ===
Two members of staff were arrested in March 2015 under the 1948 Sedition Act. Eric Paulsen, LFL's Executive Director, was arrested after tweeting about the Syariah Criminal Code's 2015 Enactment. It was his second arrest under the Sedition Act. Michelle Yesudas, the organisation's legal co-ordinator was also arrested after publishing a tweet expressing concern for her safety following threats. Both staff were later released on bail.

== See also ==
- Human rights in Malaysia
