= Catholic Church in Saudi Arabia =

Catholicism in Saudi Arabia is officially barred from being practised, though Catholics are allowed into the country for temporary work. There is a large expatriate Filipino community in Saudi Arabia, many of whom are thought to be Catholics. There are no parishes in Saudi Arabia, which comes under the jurisdiction of the Apostolic Vicariate of Northern Arabia.

Saudi Arabia allows Catholics and Christians of other denominations to enter the country as foreign workers for temporary work, but does not allow them to practise their faith openly. As a result, Catholics and other Christians generally only worship in secret within private homes. Items and articles belonging to religions other than Islam are not prohibited, as long as they're just used privately. These include Bibles, crucifixes, statues, carvings, items with religious symbols, and others, although the government's stated policy was that such items were allowed for private religious purposes.

The Saudi Arabian Mutaween (Arabic: مطوعين), or Committee for the Promotion of Virtue and the Prevention of Vice prohibits the practice of any religion other than Islam. Conversion of a Muslim to another religion is considered apostasy, which, along with proselytising by non-Muslims, is prohibited, and can lead to the death penalty.

The government permits non-Muslim clergy to enter the country for the purpose of conducting religious services.

In 2018, it was reported that the Committee for the Promotion of Virtue and the Prevention of Vice had stopped enforcing the ban on Christian religious services in the Kingdom. It was also reported that a Coptic Mass was openly conducted for the first time in Riyadh during the visit of Ava Morkos, Coptic Bishop of Shobra Al-Kheima in Egypt. Morkos had been formally invited to Saudi Arabia by Crown Prince Mohammad bin Salman in March 2018.

== Demographics ==
In 2022, the number of Christians living in Saudi Arabia was estimated at 2.1 million; however, it is unknown how many are Catholics, Orthodox, or Protestants.

In 2020, adherents of Catholicism were estimated to make up of 5.56% of the population. Other figures suggested that Catholics number almost 1.3 million people, making up about 7% of the Saudi population. There is a substantial Catholic community in the country, made up exclusively of immigrant workers: mainly Filipino Catholics (about 1 million, 85% Catholics according to estimates of 2010) and Indian Catholics, the number of whom is not known exactly. In Saudi Arabia there is no territorial jurisdiction of the Catholic Church: the territory of the country is included in the Apostolic Vicariate of Northern Arabia, based in Awali, Bahrain.

== Relations between the Holy See and Saudi Arabia ==
Saudi Arabia and the Holy See do not have diplomatic relations. The pontifical representative of local Christians is the apostolic delegate in the Arabian Peninsula, who lives in Kuwait.

A historical moment occurred on November 6, 2007, when Pope Benedict XVI received King Abdullah in audience at the Vatican.

== See also ==
- Religion in Saudi Arabia
- Christianity in Saudi Arabia
- Oriental Orthodoxy in Saudi Arabia
- Eastern Orthodoxy in Saudi Arabia
- Human rights in Saudi Arabia
- Capital punishment in Saudi Arabia
- Filipinos in Saudi Arabia
