= Michelle Yesudas =

Malaysian lawyer

- Born: Michelle Darlene Yesudas
- Occupation: Senior Legal Expert
- Employer: International Commission of Jurists
- Board member of: Formerly the Legal/Campaign Coordinator at Lawyers for Liberty

Michelle Yesudas (b. ca. 1987) is a Malaysian lawyer and human rights activist. She was a co-founder and coordinator in the Malaysian human rights and law reform NGO, Lawyers for Liberty, where she notably acted as the defence counsel of activist Ali Abd Jalil. After her move to Amnesty International, she has been researching and campaigning against the 'war on drugs' in the Philippines and intends to work on defending human rights defenders in South East Asia. Currently, Yesudas is working with the International Commission of Jurists in Yangon, Myanmar as a Senior Legal Expert.

== Education ==
Yesudas obtained a Bachelor of Laws from the University of London before obtaining a Masters in International Development Law and Human Rights at the University of Warwick.
