= Jubail Church =

Coordinates: 26°56′14.78″N 49°39′23.3″E

- كنيسة الجبيل
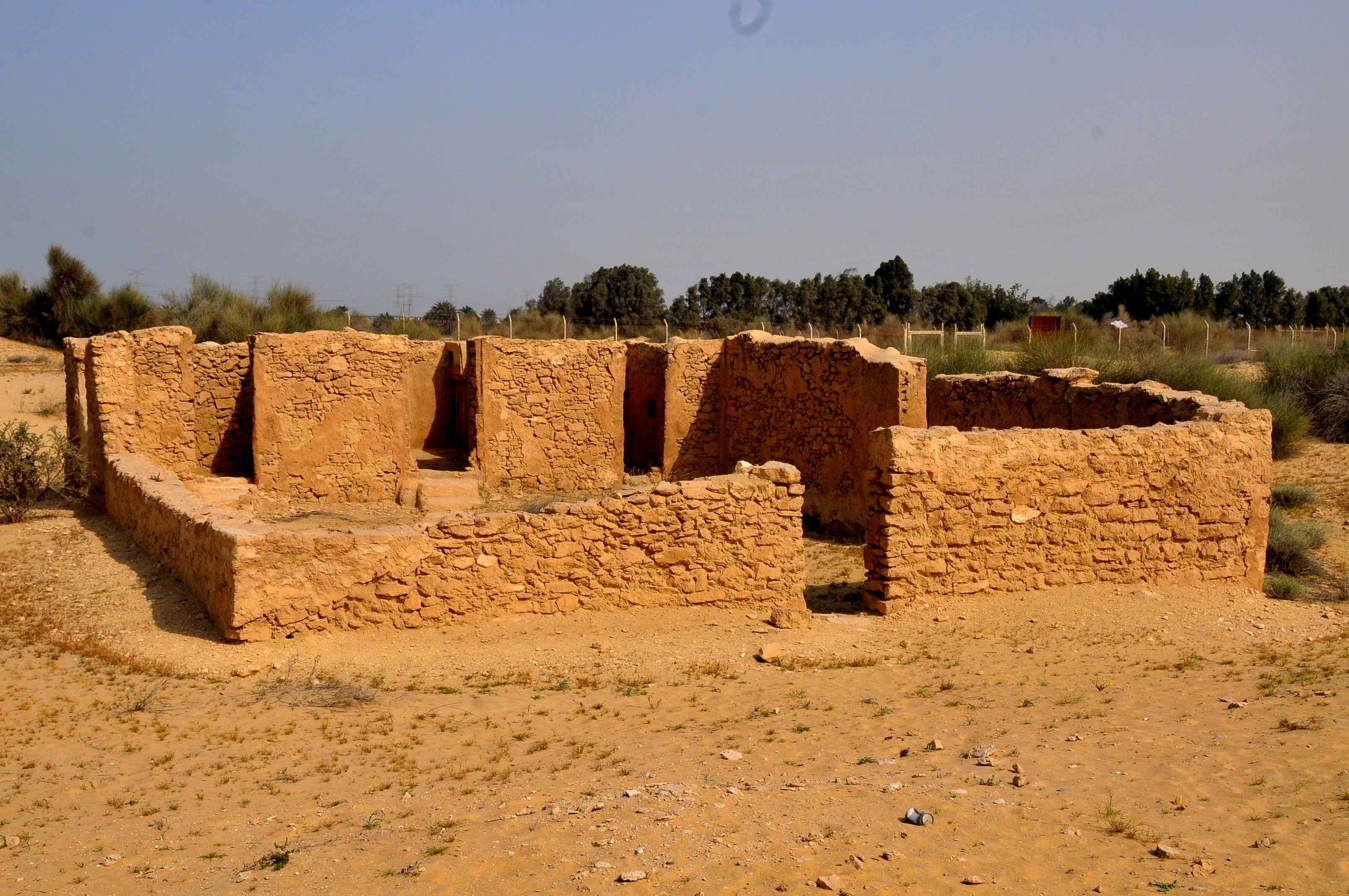
- Jubail Church
- Jubail Church
- Location: Jubail
- Country: Saudi Arabia
- Denomination: Syriac Christianity

Architecture
- Completed: 4th-century

Jubail Church (Classical Syriac: ܥܕܬܐ ܕܡܕܢܚܐ ܕܐܬܘܖ̈ܝܐ, romanized: ʿĒḏtā ḏ-Maḏnḥā ḏ-ʾĀṯūrāyē; Arabic: كنيسة الجبيل) is an ancient church building near Jubail, a city in the Eastern province on the Persian Gulf coast of Saudi Arabia. The date of the Jubail Church is contentious. Some sources place it in the fourth century, whereas others place it in the seventh. It contains a stucco, which suggests it is contemporary with similar Christian sites known from al-Qusur, Sir Bani Yas and Kharg. It contains two still visible crosses that have been carved into the wall on either side of the middle inner doorway leading from the nave towards the sanctuary.

The church was discovered in 1986 and excavated by the Saudi Department of Antiquities in 1987. As of 2008, the results of the excavation had not been published, amid sensitivity about artifacts of non-Islamic origin.

== History ==
The church originally belonged to the Church of the East (Nestorian Church), a branch of Eastern Christianity in West Asia.

It was discovered in 1986 by picnickers, and excavated in 1987. As of 2009 the site was fenced, and tourists and archaeologists were not permitted to examine it. Faisal al-Zamil, who had previously visited the site, was not permitted to publish information about it in Saudi media.

== See also ==
- Christianity in pre-Islamic Arabia
- Christianity in Saudi Arabia
- List of the oldest churches in the world
