= Hamza Kashgari =

Saudi poet and former columnist

Hamza Kashgari Mohamad Najeeb حمزة كاشغري
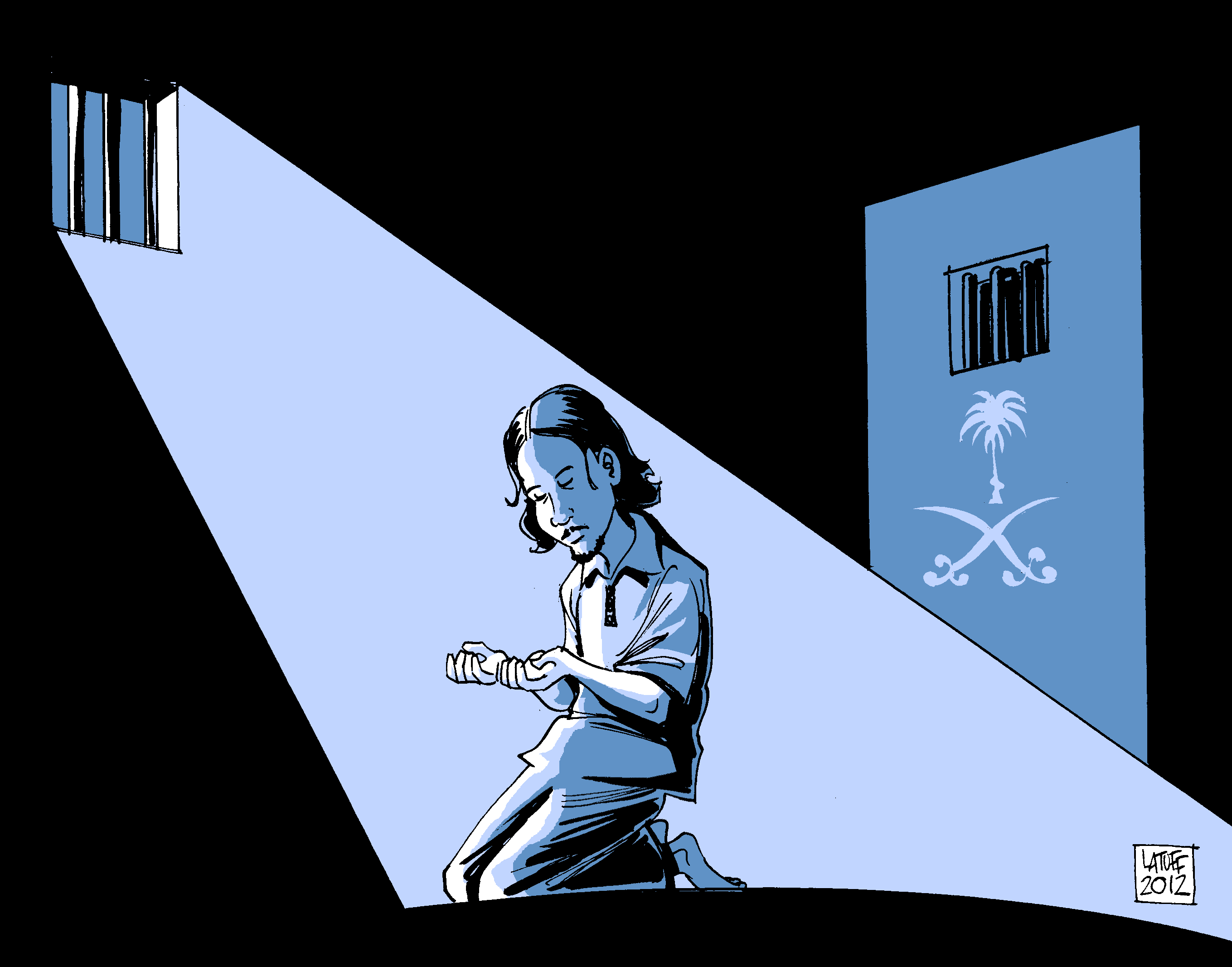
- Hamza Kashgari by Carlos Latuff
- Born: 1989 (age 36–37)
- Occupations: Poet, columnist
- Notable credit: Al-Bilad Columnist (until Jan 2012)

Hamza Kashgari Mohamad Najeeb (often Hamza Kashgari, Arabic: حمزة كاشغري; born 1989) is a Saudi poet and a former columnist for the Saudi daily newspaper Al-Bilad. In 2011, he was on a Mabahith watchlist of pro-democracy activists.

Kashgari became the subject of a controversy after he was accused of insulting the Islamic prophet Muhammad in three short messages published through the Twitter social networking service. King Abdullah ordered that Kashgari be arrested "for crossing red lines and denigrating religious beliefs in God and His Prophet". Kashgari left Saudi Arabia, trying to seek political asylum in New Zealand. On February 12, 2012, he was extradited from Kuala Lumpur, Malaysia, back to Saudi Arabia while a Malaysian High Court injunction against his extradition was issued. Whether Kashgari was deported before or after the issuing of the injunction is disputed between Malaysian authorities and the Malaysian NGO Lawyers for Liberty (LFL). Saudi authorities jailed Kashgari for nearly two years without trial for his Twitter messages.

== Early life and activities ==
According to Gulf News, Kashgari was born to a family of Uyghur ancestry, which had emigrated from Kashgar, Xinjiang, China. Hamza Kashgari worked as a columnist for the daily Al-Bilad. On February 7, 2012, Al-Bilad issued a statement saying that they had fired Kashgari five weeks earlier for the "inadequacy of his general views for the approach of the newspaper".

Kashgari has publicly supported the Arab Spring and according to the LFL, he is active in a group supporting the Arab Spring. Lawyers for Liberty and N. Surendran of the Malaysian People's Justice Party (PKR) stated that Kashgari was monitored by Mabahith in 2011 and that he was "on a Saudi watchlist of young pro-democracy activists who had voiced support for the Arab Spring uprisings". When hundreds of people protested on January 29, 2011, in Jeddah against poor infrastructure after the city was flooded and eleven people died, Kashgari criticised the authorities' response in his public writing for al-Bilad. He also "raised questions about the religious police". Kashgari published an article in al-Bilad about political prisoners, who constitute one of the major motivations in the 2011–2012 Saudi Arabian protests and made blog posts in support of Syrian uprising activists. In early February 2012, his group of activists were prevented by Saudi police from "organizing a series of forums to show solidarity with the Syrian uprising". On February 5, 2012, Kashgari participated in a sit-in at Nawras Circle in Jeddah calling for the Syria Ambassador in Riyadh to be expelled. He was briefly detained by police.

== Twitter posts ==
On the occasion of Mawlid on February 4, 2012, Kashgari published three messages on the Twitter website about an imagined meeting with Muhammad:

- On your birthday I'll say that I have loved the maverick in you, that you've always been a source of inspiration to me, and that I don't like the halos of divinity around you. I won't be praying for you.
- On your birthday I find you wherever I turn. I'll say that I have loved aspects of you, hated others, and could not understand many more.
- On your birthday I won't be bowing to you. I won't be kissing your hand. Rather I'll shake it as an equal to an equal, and smile at you as you smile at me. I'll speak to you as a friend, no more.

Kashgari described his intentions in terms of human rights: "I view my actions as part of a process toward freedom. I was demanding my right to practice the most basic human rights—freedom of expression and thought—so nothing was done in vain. I believe I'm just a scapegoat for a larger conflict. There are a lot of people like me in Saudi Arabia who are fighting for their rights." Kashgari described the status of women's rights in Saudi Arabia by stating that Saudi women "won't go to hell 'because it's impossible to go there twice."

=== Reactions ===
Following Kashgari's controversial messages, racist comments in reference to his Uyghur family background were made against him on Twitter as "[not being] enough of a 'pure' Saudi". Reactions included over 30,000 tweets regarding the subject, a Facebook group calling for his execution that 26,632 members joined as of February 17, 2012, another Facebook group in support of him that over 1,500 members joined as of February 12, 2012, and a petition calling for all blasphemy charges against him to be dropped, signed by 7,894 people as of February 17, 2012. On February 5, 2012, Saudi cleric Nasser al-Omar called for Kashgari to be tried for apostasy, which is defined as a crime by some Muslim states. The majority of Muslim scholars hold to the traditional view that apostasy in Islam is punishable by death or imprisonment until repentance, at least for adult men of sound mind. Several contemporary Muslim scholars, including influential Islamic reformers, have rejected this, arguing for religious freedom instead. The YouTube video clip of al-Omar demand was watched over 650,000 times in the first three days.

Kashgari said that he had expected "not even 1 percent" of the reaction it elicited. On February 6, Kashgari issued an apology and deleted his Twitter account, saying that "some like-minded friends have done the same". According to Emirates 24/7, Kashgari's letter of apology was published in many Saudi newspapers. Saudi Media Minister Abdel Aziz Khoja banned him from writing in any Saudi publication. On February 8, the General Presidency of Scholarly Research and Ifta, headed by Saudi Grand Mufti Abdul-Azeez ibn Abdullaah Aal ash-Shaikh, issued a statement calling for Kashgari to be tried.

In mid-February, the Grand Mufti of Egypt, Ali Gomaa, responded to the calls for Kashgari's execution stating, "We don't kill our sons, we talk to them." He listed "three points before [making] any judgments": verifying what Kashgari "really said", deciding if Kashgari's statements were "a form of misconduct, an expression of doubt, or an actual insult", and "if one repents it should be accepted". On February 12, the Association of British Muslims called for King Abdullah to drop any charges laid against Kashgari, stating "Thought crime is no crime at all...Any state enforced penalty for perceived blasphemy runs contrary to the true spirit of Islam, and of our Prophet, peace be upon him, who was compassionate even to those who scorned him...No one should be legally prosecuted, imprisoned or detained for simply expressing themselves."

On February 13, The Washington Post described King Abdullah's February 10 criticism of President Bashar al-Assad's actions during the Syrian uprising to be hypocritical in comparison with his order for the prosecution of Kashgari and the killing by Saudi security forces of Muneer al-Midani on February 9 and Zuhair al-Said on February 10 in political protests in Qatif. Kashgari and his lawyers believe that the calls for his execution may be politically motivated, as part of a crackdown on Saudi Arabian activists involved in the Arab Spring.

=== Exile, arrest, and deportation ===
Kashgari stated that he wished to apply for political asylum in New Zealand. On February 7, Al Arabiya online reported that Kashgari had left Saudi Arabia. King Abdullah ordered Kashgari's arrest "for crossing red lines and denigrating religious beliefs in God and His Prophet." He was then arrested at Kuala Lumpur International Airport in Malaysia on February 9.

On February 10, Kashgari's lawyer, Muhammad Afiq Muhammad Noor, said that the Malaysian police inspector general and Ministry of Home Affairs had received his application for access to Kashgari and had not yet granted access. Malaysia does not have an extradition treaty with Saudi Arabia. Kashgari's lawyers obtained a High Court injunction at 13:30 local time, February 12, ordering "the police, the Home Ministry, as well as the Subang and Kuala Lumpur International Airport immigration authorities to stop Kashgari's deportation". The lawyers were told that Kashgari had already boarded a plane, at 10:00 local time (02:00 UTC). According to Fadiah Nadwa Fikri of Lawyers for Liberty, the court injunction against Kashgari's injunction was granted on February 12 at 13:45 (local time). At around 14:15 to 14:30 at Sultan Abdul Aziz Shah Airport (Subang), Kashgari's lawyers found that there were no immigration records of Kashgari's departure. At 15:15, they found no immigration records of his departure from Kuala Lumpur International Airport. Malaysian police spokesman Ramli Yoosuf confirmed that Kashgari had been deported back to Saudi Arabia. He was arrested in Riyadh on the "night" of February 12.

Amnesty International, Human Rights Watch, Electronic Frontier Foundation, Freedom House, EveryOne Group, and Front Line Defenders called on the government of Malaysia to release Kashgari and not to extradite him to Saudi Arabia. Amnesty also called him a prisoner of conscience. The European Union condemned his deportation, saying it would "[take] all appropriate steps to achieve a positive outcome of Mr Kashgari's case".

Interpol denied any involvement in Kashgari's case after news reports mentioned that Malaysia had arrested and deported him based on an Interpol request. The Ministry of Home Affairs and the Royal Malaysia Police withdrew their claim of Interpol involvement. The Malaysian NGO Lawyers for Liberty stated, "The initial claim of Interpol's involvement was a blatant attempt to varnish the arrest with a veneer of international legitimacy since the arrest could not be justified under international law as Hamza was clearly a political refugee". A Freedom of Information Act request to Interpol in the United States returned no responsive documents related to the case.

=== Freedom ===
After nearly two years in prison, Kashgari was freed on October 29, 2013. Kashgari used Twitter to inform his supporters of his release. Kashgari's lawyer, Abdul Rahman Allahim, confirmed the release in another tweet. He returned home where he was reunited with his mother.

=== Legal cases ===
==== Malaysia ====
Lawyers for Liberty claimed that Malaysian authorities violated international law by not allowing Kashgari to try to obtain political asylum. Lawyer K. Ragunath and several members of Lawyers for Liberty filed a habeas corpus affidavit against the Inspector-General of Police, the Immigration Director-General, the Home Minister and the federal government of Malaysia, alleging that they had been "misled throughout [Kashgari's] arrest and deportation." Fadiah Nadwa Fikri of Lawyers for Liberty referred to the authorities' initial claim of an Interpol request that was later retracted, an incorrect claim of Kashgari's arrival date in Malaysia, and a claim that Kashgari had been deported "according to a 'long-standing arrangement' [between] Malaysia and Saudia Arabia." She said that no such treaty or official documentation exists. Lawyers for Liberty claimed that no immigration records existed for Kashgari's would-be 10:00 departure on February 12.

==== Saudi Arabia ====
According to Arab News, Kashgari will be charged by Saudi Arabian judicial authorities with blasphemy. Human Rights Watch believes that he is to be charged with apostasy and that he has already been declared by Saudi religious authorities to be guilty of apostasy prior to trial. In August 2012, Kashgari's family published a poem by him in which he apologized for the offense he had caused, and they asked publicly for his release, a common practice during Eid Al-Fitr, the holiday marking the end of Ramadan. He was not released.

Kashgari tweeted about his sudden release on October 29, 2013, saying "Mornings of hope...souls that live and never die. Thanks to God." Kashgari's lawyer, Abdulrahman Allahim, congratulated him on his release. There has been no comment from the Saudi government.

== See also ==
- 2011 Saudi Arabian protests
- Dina Ali
- Islamic Feminism
- Sara bint Talal bin Abdulaziz Al Saud
- Samar Badawi
- Mishaal bint Fahd bin Mohammed Al Saud
- Manal al-Sharif
