= Freedom of religion in Saudi Arabia =

The Kingdom of Saudi Arabia is an Islamic absolute monarchy in which Sunni Islam is the official state religion based on firm Sharia law. Non-Muslims must practice their religion in private and are vulnerable to discrimination and arrest. While no law requires all citizens to be Muslim, non-Muslim foreigners attempting to acquire Saudi Arabian nationality must convert to Islam. Children born to Muslim fathers are by law deemed Muslim.

Religious freedom is not provided for under the law. The government does not provide legal recognition or protection for freedom of religion, and it is severely restricted in practice. As a matter of policy, the government guarantees and protects the right to private worship for all, including non-Muslims who gather in homes for religious practice; however, this right is not respected in practice and is not defined in law.

The Saudi Mutaween (Arabic: مطوعين), also known as the Committee for the Promotion of Virtue and the Prevention of Vice (CPVPV) or "religious police" was enforcing the prohibition on the public practice of non-Muslim religions, though its powers were significantly curtailed in April 2016. Sharia applies to all people inside Saudi Arabia, regardless of religion.

== Religious demography ==
The country's total land area is about 2,150,000 sq kilometers and in 2022 the population was about 34 million, of whom approximately 19 million were citizens. Comprehensive statistics for the religious denominations of foreigners are not available, but estimated figures in a US State Department report for 2022 show approximately 31.5 million Muslims from the various branches and schools of Islam, 2.1 million Christians (including Eastern Orthodox, Protestants, and Roman Catholics), 708,000 Hindus, 114,000 Buddhists, approximately 67,000 Sikhs, and 242,000 atheists.

Accurate religious demographics of citizens are difficult to obtain. A majority of Saudi citizens identify as Sunni Muslim. A minority of citizens are Shia Muslims. In 2006, they formed around 15% of the native population. They live mostly in the eastern districts on the Persian Gulf (Qatif, Al-Hasa, Dammam), where they constitute approximately three-quarters of the native population, and in the western highlands of Arabia (districts of Jazan, Najran, Asir, Medina, Ta'if, and Hijaz).

== Status of religious freedom ==
Saudi Arabia is an Islamic theocracy and the government has declared the Qur'an and the Sunnah (tradition) of Muhammad to be the country's Constitution. Proselytizing for religions other than Islam is illegal. Islam is the official religion. Under the law, children born to Muslim fathers are also Muslim, regardless of the country or the religious tradition in which they have been raised. The government prohibits the public practice of other religions but generally allows private practice of non-Muslim religions. The primary source of law in Saudi Arabia is based on Sharia (Islamic law), with Shari'a courts basing their judgments largely on a code derived from the Qur'an and the Sunnah. Additionally, traditional tribal law and custom remain significant.

The only national holidays observed in Saudi Arabia are the two Eids, Eid Al-Fitr at the end of Ramadan and Eid Al-Adha at the conclusion of the Hajj and the Saudi national day. Contrary practices, such as celebrating Maulid Al-Nabi (birthday of Muhammad) and visits to the tombs of renowned Muslims, are forbidden, although enforcement was more relaxed in some communities than in others, and Shi'a were permitted to observe Ashura publicly in some communities.

== Restrictions on religious freedom ==
Islamic practice generally is limited to that of a school of the Sunni branch of Islam as interpreted by Muhammad ibn Abd al Wahhab, an 18th-century Arab religious scholar. Outside Saudi Arabia, this branch of Islam is often referred to as "Wahhabi," a term the Saudis do not use.

Practices contrary to this interpretation, such as celebration of Muhammad's birthday and visits to the tombs of renowned Muslims, are discouraged. The spreading of Muslim teachings not in conformity with the officially accepted interpretation of Islam is prohibited. Writers and other individuals who publicly criticize this interpretation, including both those who advocate a stricter interpretation and those who favor a more moderate interpretation than the government's, have reportedly been imprisoned and faced other reprisals.

The Ministry of Islamic Affairs supervises and finances the construction and maintenance of almost all mosques in the country, although over 30% of all mosques in Saudi Arabia are built and endowed by private persons. The Ministry pays the salaries of imams (prayer leaders) and others who work in the mosques. A governmental committee defines the qualifications of imams. The CPVPV, "religious police", or Mutawwa'in is a government entity, and its chairman has ministerial status. The Committee sends out armed and unarmed people into the public to ensure that Saudi citizens and expatriates living in the kingdom follow the Islamic mores, at least in public.

Saudi law prohibits alcoholic beverages and pork products in the country as they are considered to be taboo in Islam, even though both can be consumed if Muslims are starving or dying of thirst. Those violating the law are handed harsh punishments. Drug trafficking is always punished by death.

Under Saudi law conversion by a Muslim to another religion is considered apostasy, a crime punishable by death. In March 2014, the Saudi interior ministry issued a royal decree branding all atheists as terrorists, which defines terrorism as "calling for atheist thought in any form, or calling into question the fundamentals of the Islamic religion on which this country is based."

Non-Muslims are strictly prohibited by Saudi Arabia from entering the Holy City of Mecca. However, the ban on visiting Medina, Islam's second holiest city, was lifted in 2023, allowing non-Muslims to enter the city—though access to the Prophet's Mosque remains restricted. On highways, religious police officers may divert them or hand out a fine. In the cities themselves, road checks are randomly conducted.

Saudi Arabia prohibits public non-Muslim religious activities. Non-Muslim worshipers risk arrest, imprisonment, lashing, deportation, and sometimes torture for engaging in overt religious activity that attracts official attention. In July 2012 the Bodu Bala Sena, an extremist Buddhist organization based in Sri Lanka, reported that Premanath Pereralage Thungasiri, a Sri Lankan Buddhist employed in Saudi Arabia, had been arrested for worshiping the Buddha in his employer's home, and that plans were being made to behead him. The Sri Lankan Embassy has rejected these reports. In the past, Sri Lankan officials have also rejected reports regarding labor conditions issued by New York-based Human Rights Watch.

The government has stated publicly, including before the U.N. Committee on Human Rights in Geneva, that its policy is to protect the right of non-Muslims to worship privately. However, non-Muslim organizations have claimed that there are no explicit guidelines for distinguishing between public and private worship, such as the number of persons permitted to attend and the types of locations that are acceptable. Such lack of clarity, as well as instances of arbitrary enforcement by the authorities, obliges most non-Muslims to worship in such a manner as to avoid discovery. Those detained for non-Muslim worship almost always are deported by authorities after sometimes lengthy periods of arrest during investigation. In some cases, they also are sentenced to receive lashes prior to deportation.

In 2022, there were no religious-worker visas, but non-Muslim clergy were able to enter the country to work in their communities. They were also able to bring in religious items, including books.

Proselytizing by non-Muslims, including the distribution of non-Muslim religious materials such as Bibles, is illegal. Muslims or non-Muslims wearing religious symbols of any kind in public risk confrontation with the Mutawwa'in. In 2001, the Ministry of Islamic Affairs ran approximately 50 "Call and Guidance" centers employing approximately 500 persons work to convert foreigners to Islam. Some non-Muslim foreigners convert to Islam during their stay in the country. The press often carries articles about such conversions, including testimonials. The press as well as government officials publicized the conversion of the Italian Ambassador to Saudi Arabia, Torquato Cardilli, in late 2001.

The government requires noncitizen residents to carry a Saudi residence permit (Iqama) for identification in place of their passports. Among other information, these contain a religious designation for "Muslim" or "non-Muslim."

Members of the Shi’a minority are the subjects of officially sanctioned political and economic discrimination. The authorities permit the celebration of the Shi’a holiday of Ashura in the eastern province city of Qatif. No other Ashura celebrations are permitted in the country, and many Shi’a travel to Qatif or to Bahrain to participate in Ashura celebrations.

Shi’a have declined government offers to build state-supported mosques because they fear the government would prohibit the incorporation and display of Shi’a motifs in any such mosques. The government seldom permits private construction of Shi’a mosques. During 2013, virtually all existing mosques in al-Ahsa were unable to obtain licenses and faced the threat of closure at any time and in other parts of the country were not allowed to build Shia-specific mosques.

In 2022, the government executed 81 men, including 41 Saudi Shia, in the largest known mass execution carried out in the kingdom's history.

Members of the Shi’a minority are discriminated against in government employment, especially with respect to positions that relate to national security, such as in the military or in the Ministry of the Interior. The government restricts employment of Shi’a in the oil and petrochemical industries. The government also discriminates against Shi’a in higher education through unofficial restrictions on the number of Shi’a admitted to universities. This discrimination has been noted for many years.

Under the provisions of Shari’a law as practiced in the country, judges may discount the testimony of people who are not practicing Muslims or who do not adhere to the official interpretation of Islam. Legal sources report that testimony by Shi’a is often ignored in courts of law or is deemed to have less weight than testimony by Sunnis. Sentencing under the legal system is not uniform. Laws and regulations state that defendants should be treated equally; however, under Shari’a as interpreted and applied in the country, crimes against Muslims may result in harsher penalties than those against non-Muslims. Information regarding government practices was generally incomplete because judicial proceedings usually were not publicized or were closed to the public, despite provisions in the criminal procedure law requiring court proceedings to be open.

In the past Customs officials have regularly opened postal material and cargo to search for non-Muslim materials, such as Bibles and religious videotapes; such materials have been subject to confiscation.

Sunni Islamic religious education is mandatory in public schools at all levels. Private schools must also teach the same curriculum, except for private international schools which must teach Islamic studies. In 2022 the government reduced the number of hours required for religious education, in favor of more study time for Arabic and STEM.

In 2007, Saudi religious police detained Shiite pilgrims participating in the Hajj and Umrah pilgrimage, allegedly calling them "infidels in Mecca and Medina".

The United States Commission on International Religious Freedom (USCIRF) in its 2019 report named Saudi Arabia as one of the world's worst violators of religious freedom.

Until 2016, the kingdom only used the lunar Islamic calendar, not the international Gregorian calendar, but in 2016 the kingdom announced its switch to the Gregorian calendar for civil purposes. Daily life is influenced by Islamic observance. Some businesses decide to close three or four times per day for 30 to 45 minutes during business hours while employees and customers are sent off to pray. The weekend is Friday-Saturday, not Saturday-Sunday because Friday is the holiest day for Muslims. For many years only two religious holidays were publicly recognized – ʿĪd al-Fiṭr and ʿĪd al-Aḍḥā. (ʿĪd al-Fiṭr is "the biggest" holiday, a three-day period of "feasting, gift-giving and general letting go").

In 2004, approximately half of the broadcast airtime of Saudi state television was devoted to religious issues. Ninety per cent of books published in the kingdom were on religious subjects, and most of the doctorates awarded by its universities were in Islamic studies. In the state school system, about half of the material taught is religious. In contrast, assigned readings over 12 years of primary and secondary schooling devoted to covering the history, literature, and cultures of the non-Muslim world come to a total of about 40 pages.

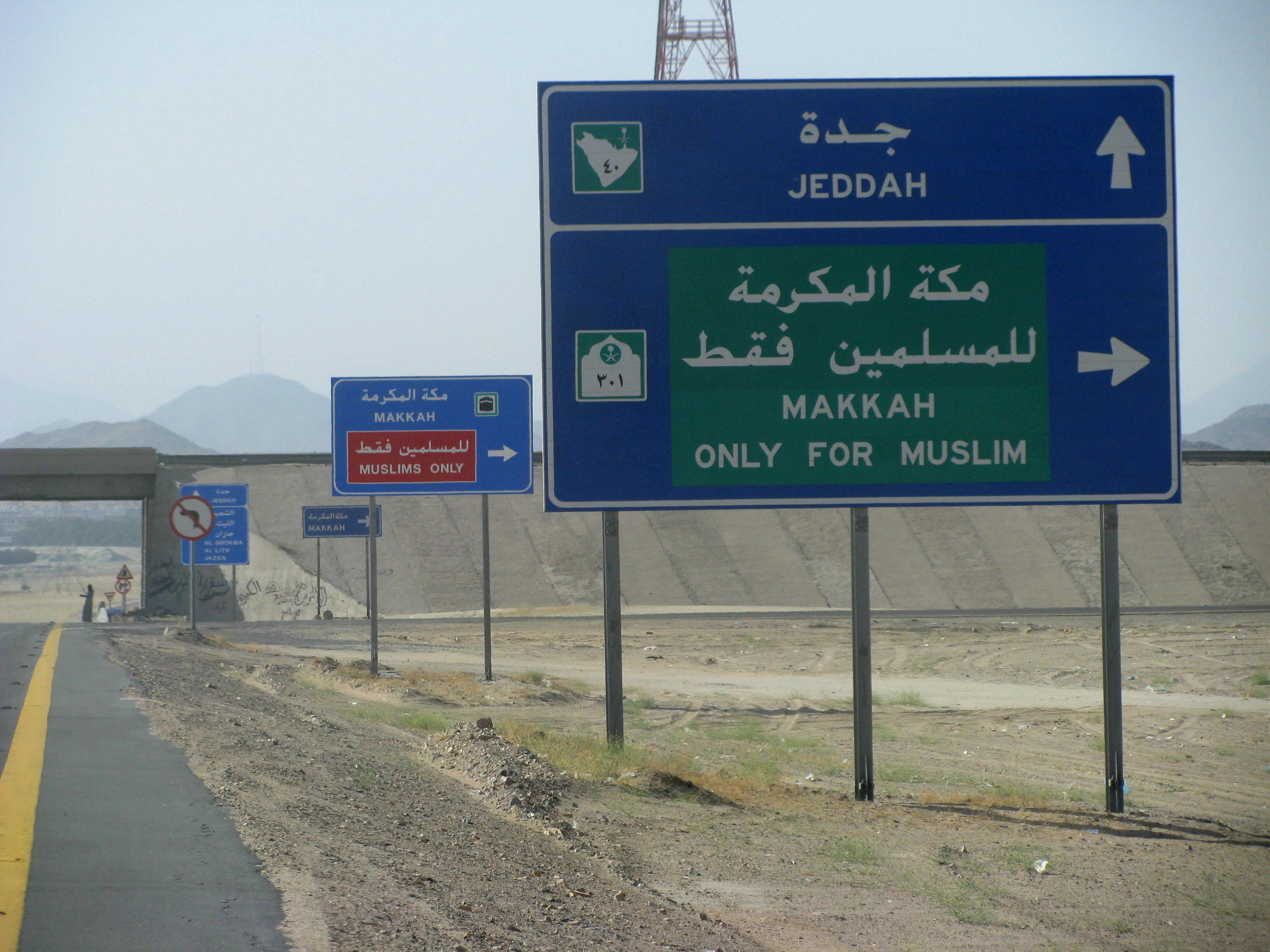
Non-Muslims are prohibited from entering the Islamic holy city of Mecca

"Fierce religious resistance" had to be overcome to permit such innovations as paper money (in 1951), female education (1964), and television (1965) and the abolition of slavery (1962). Public support for the traditional political/religious structure of the kingdom is so strong that one researcher interviewing Saudis found virtually no support for reforms to secularize the state.

Celebration of other (non-Wahhabi) Islamic holidays, such as the Muhammad's birthday and the Day of Ashura, (an important holiday for the 10–25% of the population that is Shīʿa Muslim), are tolerated only when celebrated locally and on a small scale. Shias also face systematic discrimination in employment, education, the justice system according to Human Rights Watch. Non-Muslim festivals like Christmas, Easter, Halloween, and New Year were not tolerated until recently. No churches, temples or other non-Muslim houses of worship are permitted in the country. Proselytizing by non-Muslims and conversion by Muslims to another religion is illegal. In legal compensation court cases (Diyya) non-Muslim are awarded less than Muslims. Atheists are legally designated as terrorists. At least one religious minority, the Ahmadiyya Muslims, had its adherents deported, as they are legally banned from entering the country.

In a recent move to promote a modern image, Saudi Arabia banned the religious group known as 'Tablighi Jamaat'. The announcement was made on social media by the country's Minister of Islamic Affairs who warned people against association during the Friday sermon.

=== Ahmadiyya ===
Ahmadis are persecuted in Saudi Arabia on an ongoing basis. Although there have been many foreign workers and Saudi citizens belonging to the Ahmadiyya sect in Saudi Arabia, Ahmadis are officially banned from entering the country and from performing the Hajj and Umrah pilgrimage to Mecca and Medina.

By 2022, authorities indicated that they considered Ahmadiyya Muslims to be Muslims; however the group's legal status is unclear.

=== Blasphemy and apostasy ===
Saudi Arabia has criminal statutes making it illegal for a Muslim to change religion or to renounce Islam, which is defined as apostasy and punishable by death. For this reason, Saudi Arabia is known as 'the hell for apostates', with many ex-Muslims seeking to leave or flee the country before their non-belief is discovered, and living pseudonymous second lives on the Internet.

On 3 September 1992, Sadiq 'Abdul-Karim Malallah was publicly beheaded in Al-Qatif in Saudi Arabia's Eastern Province after being convicted of apostasy and blasphemy. Malallah, a Shi'a Muslim from Saudi Arabia, was arrested in April 1988 and charged with throwing stones at a police patrol. He was reportedly held in solitary confinement for long periods during his first months in detention and tortured prior to his first appearance before a judge in July 1988. The judge reportedly asked him to convert from Shi'a Islam to Sunni Wahhabi Islam, promising a more lenient sentence if he complied. After he refused, Malallah was taken to al-Mabahith al-'Amma (General Intelligence) Prison in Dammam where he was held until April 1990. He was then transferred to al-Mabahith al-'Amma Prison in Riyadh, where he remained until the date of his execution. Malallah is believed to have been involved in efforts to secure improved rights for Saudi Arabia's Shi'a Muslim minority.

In 1994, Hadi Al-Mutif, a teenager who was a Shi’a Ismaili Muslim from Najran in southwestern Saudi Arabia, made a remark that a court deemed blasphemous and was sentenced to death for apostasy. As of 2010, he was still in prison, complained of physical abuse and mistreatment during his incarceration, and had reportedly made numerous suicide attempts.

In 2012, Saudi poet and journalist Hamza Kashgari became the subject of a major controversy after being accused of insulting the Islamic prophet Mohammad in three short messages (tweets) published on Twitter. King Abdullah ordered that Kashgari be arrested "for crossing red lines and denigrating religious beliefs in God and His Prophet."

Ahmad Al Shamri from the town of Hafar al-Batin was arrested on charges of atheism and blasphemy after allegedly using social media to state that he renounced Islam and Mohammad. He was sentenced to death in February 2015.

Rahaf Mohammed رهف محمد
(@rahaf84427714)
tweeted:

based on the 1951 Convention and the 1967 Protocol, I'm rahaf mohmed, formally seeking a refugee status to any country that would protect me from getting harmed or killed due to leaving my religion and torture from my family.

6 January 2019

In January 2019, 18-year-old Rahaf Mohammed fled Saudi Arabia after having renounced Islam and being abused by her family. On her way to Australia, she was held by Thai authorities in Bangkok while her father tried to take her back, but Rahaf managed to use social media to attract significant attention to her case. After diplomatic intervention, she was eventually granted asylum in Canada, where she arrived and settled soon after.

=== Witchcraft and sorcery ===
In the past, the country has used the death penalty for crimes of sorcery and witchcraft and claims that it is doing so in "public interest". In 2022, sorcery is still an arrestable offence.

=== Forced religious conversion ===
Forced conversion, as per the principles of Islam is not allowed

In July 2012, two men who had evangelized a young woman who subsequently converted to Christianity were arrested in the Saudi Gulf city Al-Khabar, on charges of "forcible conversion". The girl's father had laid charges against the two men after he failed to convince the young woman to return home from Lebanon and abandon her new faith.

== Saudi practices as "religious apartheid" ==
Testifying before the U.S. Congressional Human Rights Caucus on June 4, 2002, in a briefing entitled "Human Rights in Saudi Arabia: The Role of Women", Ali Al-Ahmed, Director of the Saudi Institute, stated:

Saudi Arabia is a glaring example of religious apartheid. The religious institutions from government clerics to judges, to religious curricula, and all religious instructions in media are restricted to the Wahhabi understanding of Islam, adhered to by less than 40% of the population. The Saudi government communized Islam, through its monopoly of both religious thoughts and practice. Wahhabi Islam is imposed and enforced on all Saudis regardless of their religious orientations. The Wahhabi sect does not tolerate other religious or ideological beliefs, Muslim or not. Religious symbols by Muslims, Christians, Jews and other believers are all banned. The Saudi embassy in Washington is a living example of religious apartheid. In its 50 years, there has not been a single non-Sunni Muslim diplomat in the embassy. The branch of Imam Mohamed Bin Saud University in Fairfax, Virginia instructs its students that Shia Islam is a Jewish conspiracy.

In 2003, Amir Taheri quoted a Shi'ite businessman from Dhahran as saying "It is not normal that there are no Shi'ite army officers, ministers, governors, mayors and ambassadors in this kingdom. This form of religious apartheid is as intolerable as was apartheid based on race."

In 2007, Saudi religious police detained Shiite pilgrims participating in the Hajj and Umrah pilgrimage, allegedly calling them "infidels in Mecca and Medina".

Until March 1, 2004, the official government website stated that Jews were forbidden from entering the country. Prejudice against Jews is fairly high in the kingdom. While the webpage has been modified, no one who admits to be Jewish, on the visa paperwork or has an Israeli government stamp on their passport is allowed in the kingdom.

Alan Dershowitz wrote in 2002, "in Saudi Arabia apartheid is practiced against non-Muslims, with signs indicating that Muslims must go to certain areas and non-Muslims to others."

On 14 December 2005, Republican Representative Ileana Ros-Lehtinen and Democratic Representative Shelley Berkley introduced a bill in Congress urging American divestiture from Saudi Arabia, and giving as its rationale (among other things) "Saudi Arabia is a country that practices religious apartheid and continuously subjugates its citizenry, both Muslim and non-Muslim, to a specific interpretation of Islam." Freedom House showed on its website, on a page titled "Religious apartheid in Saudi Arabia", a picture of a sign showing Muslim-only and non-Muslim roads.

In 2007, news outlets reported that Saudi policy prohibited tourists from bringing non-Muslim religious symbols and books into the kingdom, and that doing so could result in confiscation. The U.S. State Department disputed this, claiming the restrictions were no longer in place. The 2007 U.S State Department International Religious Freedom (IRF) Report detailed several cases in which bibles were confiscated in Saudi Arabia, but said that there were fewer reports in 2007 of government officials confiscating religious materials than in previous years and no reports that customs officials had confiscated religious materials from travelers. In the past the Commission for the Promotion of Virtue and Prevention of Vice (CPVPV) and security forces of the Ministry of Interior (MOI) conducted raids on private non-Muslim religious gatherings and sometimes confiscated the personal religious materials of non-Muslims. The 2022 IRF report noted that there were no reports of visitors having their personal, non-Islamic religious materials confiscated; however the media did report the confiscation of sorcery-related items.

== 2023 freedom reports ==
In 2023, the country was scored zero out of 4 for religious freedom. In 2025, it was ranked as the 12th worst place in the world to be a Christian.

== See also ==
- Human rights in Saudi Arabia
- Religion in Saudi Arabia
