= Sadeq Mallallah =

Saudi Arabian executed for blasphemy (1970–1992)

Sadeq Abdul Kareem Malallah (Arabic: صادق عبد کریم مال‌الله; born in Qateef in 1970; died 2 September 1992) was a Shiite Saudi Arabian who was beheaded in Qateef on 3 September 1992 for allegedly "insulting Muhammad and Islam's holy book, the Koran". He was accused of calling Muhammad "a liar and swindler" who used "witchcraft" and got "help from devils" and of saying that "the Koran was fabricated by Muhammad" and that Islam is "a fabricated religion". He had been convicted by a kangaroo court of allegedly "throwing stones at a police car" in 1988 and was serving a five-year sentence in Mabahith prison at the time. Later, a judge in Qatif "accused him of smuggling a Bible into the country" and asked him to convert to Wahhabi Islam, the puritanic sect prevailing in Saudi Arabia, which harbors deep suspicions about Shiite Muslims. When Malallah refused, he reportedly was placed in solitary and physically abused. He maintained his innocence of any wrongdoings until the last moment.
