= Committee for the Promotion of Virtue and the Prevention of Vice (Saudi Arabia) =

Government agency in Saudi Arabia

Committee for the Promotion of Virtue and the Prevention of Vice الرئاسة العامة لهيئة الأمر بالمعروف والنهي عن المنكر
- Seal of the Committee
- Common name: Hai'a (Committee)
- Abbreviation: CPVPV

Agency overview
- Formed: 1940; 86 years ago

Jurisdictional structure
- Operations jurisdiction: Saudi Arabia
- General nature: Religious police

Operational structure
- Agency executive: Sheikh ‘Abdur-Rahman Ibn ‘Abdullah al-Sanad, President

Website
- https://www.pv.gov.sa

The Committee for the Promotion of Virtue and the Prevention of Vice (Arabic: هيئة الأمر بالمعروف والنهي عن المنكر, romanized: hayʾa al-ʾamr bil-maʿrūf wan-nahī ʿan al-munkar, abbreviated CPVPV, colloquially termed hai’a (committee), and known as the mutawa (Arabic: مطوع) and by other similar names and translations in English-language sources) is a government religious authority in Saudi Arabia that is charged with implementing the Islamic doctrine of hisbah in the country. Established in 1940, the body gained extensive powers in the 1980s and continued to function as a semi-independent civilian law enforcement agency for almost 35 years until 2016, when societal reforms driven by then-deputy crown prince Mohammed bin Salman led to limiting some of its authority through a royal decree by King Salman bin Abdulaziz, including the rights of pursuing, questioning, detaining, and interrogating suspects.

Tracing its modern origin to a revival of the pre-modern official function of muhtasib (market inspector) by the first Saudi state (1727–1818), it was established in its best known form in 1976, with the main goal of supervising markets and public morality, and was often described as Islamic religious police. By the early 2010s, the committee was estimated to have 3,500–4,000 officers on the streets, assisted by thousands of volunteers, with an additional 10,000 administrative personnel. Its head held the rank of cabinet minister and reported directly to the king. Committee officers and volunteers patrolled public places, with volunteers focusing on enforcing strict rules of hijab, sex segregation, and daily prayer attendance; but also non-Islamic products/activities such as the sale of dogs and cats, Barbie dolls, Pokémon, and Valentine's Day gifts.

== Names ==
The name of the committee has also been translated as Committee for the Propagation of Virtue and the Elimination of Sin, abbreviated CAVES. They are known colloquially as hai’a (literally "committee", also transliterated as Haia or Haya).

In academic sources, committee officers or the volunteers have also been called by several Arabic terms derived from the root ṭ-w-ʿ, including mutaṭawwiʿūn (Arabic: متطوعون, volunteers), muṭawwiʿ (Arabic: مطوع, one who compels obedience), and muṭāwiʿa (no literal translation given). These words are etymologically related to the Quranically derived terms muṭṭawwiʿa and mutaṭawwiʿa (those who perform supererogatory deeds of piety). English-language press has used the names mutawa and mutaween.

== History, structure, role ==
The committee's rationale is based on the classical Islamic doctrine of hisba, which is associated with the Quranic injunction of enjoining good and forbidding wrong, and refers to the duty of Muslims to promote moral rectitude and intervene when another Muslim is acting wrongly. In pre-modern Islamic history, its legal implementation was entrusted to a traditional Islamic public official called muhtasib (market inspector), who was charged with preventing fraud, disturbance of public order and infractions against public morality.

This office disappeared in the modern era everywhere in the Muslim world, including Arabia, but it was revived by the first Saudi state (1727–1818) and continued to play a role in the second (1823–87), due to its importance within Wahhabi doctrine.

First state 1727–1818 (Emirate of Diriyah)

Following the conquest of the Hijaz in 1803 a chronicler records bonfires made from confiscated tobacco pipes and stringed instruments by enforcers of sharia (after a list had been made of the owners).

According to the US Library of Congress Country Studies, mutawwiin

"have been integral to the Wahhabi movement since its inception. Mutawwiin have served as missionaries, as enforcers of public morals, and as 'public ministers of the religion' who preach in the Friday mosque. Pursuing their duties in Jiddah in 1806, the mutawwiin were observed to be 'constables for the punctuality of prayers ... with an enormous staff in their hand, [who] were ordered to shout, to scold and to drag people by the shoulders to force them to take part in public prayers, five times a day.'"

Robert Lacey describes them as "vigilantes". "The righteous of every neighbourhood [that] banded themselves together into societies for the Promotion of Virtue and the Prevention of Vice."

Second state 1823–1887 (Emirate of Nejd)

According to a study by Michael Cook, based on "Wahhabi writings and rulers' decrees" the role of commanding good and forbidding wrong developed a prominent place during the second Saudi emirate, and the first "documented instance of a formal committee to enforces the duty dates to 1926", when the official Saudi newspaper in Mecca published the news of its establishment. "One ruler orders his emirs to seek out people who gather together to smoke tobacco ... scholars and emirs should keep a check on the people of their towns with regard to prayer and religious instruction." Performance of hajj "is likewise to be monitored."

Third state (1902–)

Under the third Saudi state, the most zealous followers of Ibn Sa'ud were appointed as muhtasibs. A foreign visitor reported that in Riyāḍ in 1922-23 flogging was "commonly" administered for "smoking, non-attendance at prayer and other such offenses". This severity caused conflict with the local population and foreign pilgrims when the Hijaz was conquered and Wahhabi strictness arrived. In response, committees were established in Riyadh and Mecca in 1932 to check their excesses. After their establishment in the Hijaz, the committees "rapidly spread" to the rest of the kingdom.

Evidence that enforcement could "swing from a soft line to hard one and back again" comes from reports from Jeddah in early 1930, and summer of 1932, during a temporary move away from Wahhabi puritanism by King Ibn Saud early in his reign.

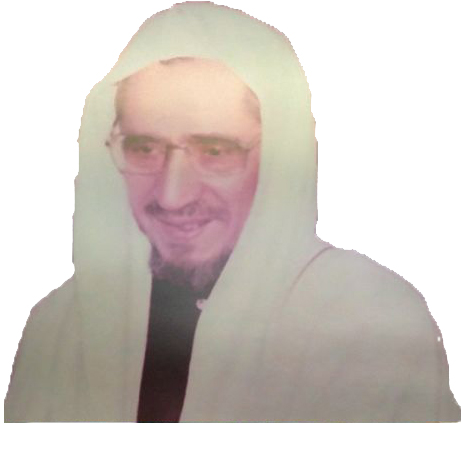
Abdul Aziz bin Abdullah bin Hassan Al Sheikh, Head of the Committee

In 1976 the two formerly mutually independent directories in the Hijaz and Najd were united under an official of ministerial rank, acting under direct royal command, and, the Al al-Sheikh director of the committee gained a seat on the Saudi cabinet, strengthening its prestige. Its control extended to small towns as well as the cities. The unified Committee for the Promotion of Virtue and the Prevention of Vice was then mainly responsible for supervising markets and public order and assisted by volunteers, who enforce attendance of daily prayers and gender segregation in public places.

Following the November–December 1979 Grand Mosque Seizure, when religion became more conservative in Saudi Arabia,

"people noticed that imams and religious folk seemed to have more money to spend ... with the religious police benefiting most obviously from government injections of cash. They started to appear in imposing new GMC vans, with their once humble local committees of mutawwa ... taking on the grander, 'Big Brother' aura of their original, collective name – Al Hayah, 'the Commission'. They developed attitude to match."

They were still, however, "essentially volunteers engaged in their own variety of social work."

In 2002, the deaths of 15 young girls in 2002 in Mecca after the mutaween's refused to let them leave a burning school was widely publicized and damaged the mutaween's image.

Beginning of restrictions on power

In May 2006 it was announced that the committee would no longer be allowed to interrogate those it arrests for behavior deemed un-Islamic. Prior to this, commission members enjoyed almost total power to arrest, detain, and interrogate those suspected of violating the Sharia.

In May 2006 the Interior Ministry issued a decree stating that "the role of the commission will end after it arrests the culprit or culprits and hands them over to police, who will then decide whether to refer them to the public prosecutor." In June 2007 the Saudi mutaween announced "the creation of a 'department of rules and regulations' to ensure the activities of commission members comply with the law, after coming under heavy pressure for the death of two people in its custody in less than two weeks". The governmental National Society for Human Rights criticised the behaviour of the religious police in May 2007 in its first report since its establishment in March 2004.

In August of that year Time magazine ran a report about the mutaween. It noted that "a campaign using text messages sent to mobile phones is calling on a million Saudis to declare that '2007 is the year of liberation.'" Despite statements of reform, the mutaween turned down Time's request for interviews.

In 2009, the committee created and formalized a special "Anti-Witchcraft Unit" to "educate the public about the evils of sorcery, investigate alleged witches, neutralize their cursed paraphernalia, and disarm their spells". The unit also had a hotline on the committee website for Saudis to report any magic to local officials.

At the beginning of October 2012, during the Arab Spring, Abdul Latif Abdul Aziz Al-Sheikh announced that the powers of the mutawiyin would be significantly restricted. According to Irfan Al-Alawi,

They will be barred from making arrests, conducting interrogations, or carrying out searches without a warrant from the local governor. They will no longer stand at the entrances of shopping malls to keep women out who do not adhere to the Wahhabi dress code or who are not accompanied by "approved" men—husbands, siblings, or parents.

"Community volunteers", who were the original mutaween, were forbidden from joining Hai’a men on their rounds and pursuing, chastising, and interrogating miscreants, as "a religious duty". Field officers were also ordered to "approach people with a smile," and forbidden from using their "private e-mails, cellphones, or social media accounts to receive and act on anonymous tips."

In January 2012, Abdul Latif Abdul Aziz al-Sheikh was appointed head of the mutaween. He "holds the rank of cabinet minister and reports directly to the king". His agency employs more than 4,000 "field officers" and reportedly has another 10,000 administrative personnel. Its 2013 budget was the equivalent of US$390 million.

Loss of power under MbS

However, in 2016, Mohammed bin Salman sharply curtailed the powers of the CPVPV (the committee). In a September 2019 article, Arab News (which has been described "reflecting official position" in Saudi Arabia), portrayed the time period from about 1979 to 2016 as an era when CPVPV "strayed" from its "original intent" of advising and guiding Saudi Muslims. Starting around 1979, the Sahwa or Islamic Awakening era commenced, "extremism ideology" flourished, and the powers of the CPVPV went "unchecked". Then, in 2016 (Arab News states), Mohammed bin Salman took an "unprecedented, risky yet necessary move" bringing the CPVPV to heel and returning it to its correct role as "society's spiritual guide".

The newspaper describes CPVPV before and after the curtailing of its power:

They destroyed musical instruments, raided beauty salons, shaved heads, whipped people, burnt books, and continued being unchecked — until an unexpected decision came out on April 11, 2016. The Saudi Cabinet issued a royal decree that stripped the religious police of its privileges, banning its members from pursuing, questioning, asking for identification, arresting and detaining anyone suspected of a crime. They are now obliged to report back to the police and security forces if need be.

Ahmad bin Qasim Al-Ghamdi (head of the Hai'a in Mecca) describes the post-2016 policy as one where the

“... CPVPV has managed to defuse the strife in the relationship between its past self and society. It has prevented the distortion and weak confidence that the people had in the procedures that were followed in the past, [which] damaged the reputation of the promotion of virtue and prevention of vice as a ritual, and the reputation of the Kingdom as a state that applies the provisions of Islam.”

== Enforcement ==
The Committee for the Promotion of Virtue and the Prevention of Vice enforces traditional Islamic morality by arresting or helping to secure the arrest of people who engage in conduct that violates Islamic principles and values. They are tasked with enforcing conservative Islamic norms of behavior defined by Saudi authorities. They monitor observance of the dress code and ensure that shops are closed during prayer times. In some instances, they broke into private homes on suspicion of untoward behavior, though this attracted criticism from the public and the government.

Upon being appointed head of the CPVPV, Abdul Latif Abdul Aziz al-Sheikh identified "five areas the religious police should focus on": preserving Islam, preventing blackmail, combating sorcery, fighting human trafficking, and ensuring that no one disobeys the country's rulers.

Saudi mutaween are often accompanied by the regular police, but also patrol without police escort. They launched a website on which un-Islamic behavior can be reported.

While on patrol, the duties of the Mutaween include, but are not restricted to:

- ensuring that drugs including alcohol are not being traded.
- checking that women wear the abaya, a traditional cloak.
- making sure that men and women who are spotted together in public are related.
- formerly, enforcing the ban on camera phones. This ban was enacted out of a fear that men would use them to secretly photograph women and publish them on the Internet without the consent of the subjects. The ban was enacted in April 2004 but was overturned in December that same year.
- preventing the population from engaging in "frivolous" Western customs such as Valentine's Day.

The punishment for such offenses is severe, often involving beatings and humiliation, and foreigners are not excluded from arrest. The mutaween encourage people to inform on others they know who are suspected of acting unvirtuously, and to punish such activities.

In 2010, a 27-year-old Saudi man was sentenced to five years in prison, 500 lashes of the whip, and a SR50,000 fine after appearing in an amateur gay video online allegedly taken inside a Jeddah prison. According to an unnamed government source, "The District Court sentenced the accused in a homosexuality case that was referred to it by the Commission for the Promotion of Virtue and Prevention of Vice (the Hai’a) in Jeddah before he was tried for impersonating a security man and behaving shamefully and with conduct violating the Islamic teachings." The case started when the Hai’a's staff arrested the man under charges of practicing homosexuality. He was referred to the Bureau for Investigation and Prosecution, which referred him to the District Court.

Among the Western practices suppressed by the mutaween is the celebration of Valentine's Day. Condemning the festivities as a "pagan feast", Mutaween inspect hotels, restaurants, coffeehouses, and gift shops on 14 February to prevent Muslim couples from giving each other Valentines or other presents. The sale of red roses, red stuffed animals, red greeting cards and other red gift items is banned, according to store owners. These items are confiscated, and those selling them subject to prosecution.

The children's game Pokémon was banned in 2001. The sale of the fashion doll Barbie was banned as a consumer product for posing a moral threat to Islam, stating: "Jewish Barbie dolls, with their revealing clothes and shameful postures, accessories and tools are a symbol of decadence to the perverted West. Let us beware of her dangers and be careful." Fulla dolls were designed and approved as more acceptable.

In 2006 the police issued a decree banning the sale of dogs and cats, also seen as a sign of Western influence. The decree which applies to the Red Sea port city of Jeddah and the holy city of Mecca bans the sale of cats and dogs because "some youths have been buying them and parading them in public," according to a memo from the municipal affairs ministry to Jeddah's city government. In 2013 two Saudi men were arrested for giving "free hugs to passersby".

In December 2010 it was reported by Arab News that the Hai'a had launched a massive campaign against "sorcery" or "black magic" in the kingdom. The prohibition includes "fortune tellers or faith healers". (Some people executed for sorcery following the announcement include a man from Najran province in June 2012, a Saudi woman in the province of Jawf, in December 2011, and a Sudanese man executed in September 2011. A Lebanese television presenter of a popular fortune-telling programme was arrested while on pilgrimage to Saudi Arabia and sentenced to death, though after pressure from the Lebanese government and human rights groups, he was freed by the Saudi Supreme Court.)

In May 2012, the head of the mutaween, Abdul Latif Abdul Aziz al-Sheikh, stated that anyone using social media sites, such as Twitter, "has lost this world and his afterlife".

According to authors Harvey Tripp and Peter North, mutaween became involved in the city planning of the Eastern Province industrial city of Jubail sometime in the 1980s and 1990s. Halfway through the construction of that city the mutaween visited the engineering drawing office several times, first to insist that all planning maps included the direction of Mecca. On their second visit they ordered that city sewage lines (already built) not flow in the direction of Mecca. After being convinced that the curvature of the earth prevented this, the mutaween returned to insist that the drainage pipes of toilets inside the city's buildings also not violate this principle. The mutaween's demands came despite the fact that no Saudi building code mentioned their requirement and no other Saudi cities met it. While a good deal of the planners' and engineers' time was spent responding to the mutaween's concerns, the mutaween never returned to approve the contractor's solution and no pipes ended up having to be unearthed and redirected, leaving Tripp and North to conclude that Mutaween's "point" was not to protect Mecca but to demonstrate the supremacy of religion in Saudi Arabia to foreign builders.

=== Exemptions ===
As of 2012, the offices of Saudi Aramco, King Abdullah University of Science and Technology, and foreign embassies are off limits to mutaween. Not off limits are personnel of Saudi government agencies. Hai’a have been known to detain government officials, (A male government employee minder of American journalist Karen Elliott House was detained for mixing of the sexes, causing her to wonder that "a government employee following the instructions of his ministry runs afoul of that same government's religious police.")

=== 2016 restriction of powers ===
On 11 April 2016, the Saudi Council of Ministers issued a new regulation that limits the jurisdiction of the Committee for the Promotion of Virtue and the Prevention of Vice. They were ordered to work only during office hours, be "gentle and humane", to report violations of Islamic law to the civil police, and forbidden from pursuing, arresting or detaining members of the public.

The new regulation has 12 clauses; most notable of them are:

"The Committee for the Promotion of Virtue and Prevention of Vice is expected to uphold its duties with kindness and gentleness as decreed by the examples of Prophet Mohammed."

"The Committee has the responsibility of reporting, while on patrol, to official authorities (depending on the suspected activity) any suspected crimes witnessed. Subsequent actions from pursuit of suspect, capture, interrogation and detainment will be left to the relevant official authorities."

"Neither the heads nor members of The Committee are to stop or arrest or chase people or ask for their IDs or follow them – that is considered the jurisdiction of the police or the drug unit."

== Controversy ==
=== Alleged abuses ===
One of the most widely criticized examples of mutaween enforcement of Sharia law came in March 2002, when 15 young girls died of burns or smoke asphyxiation by an accidental fire that engulfed their public school in Mecca. According to two newspapers, the religious police forcibly prevented girls from escaping the burning school by locking the doors of the school from the outside, and barring firemen from entering the school to save the girls, beating some of the girls and civil defense personnel in the process. Mutaween would not allow the girls to escape or to be saved because they were 'not properly covered', and the mutaween did not want physical contact to take place between the girls and the civil defense forces for fear of sexual enticement. The CPVPV denied the charges of beating or locking the gates, but the incident and the accounts of witnesses were reported in Saudi newspapers such as the Saudi Gazette and Al-Iqtisaddiyya. The result was a very rare public criticism of the group.

In May 2003, Al-Watan, a Saudi reform newspaper published several reports of people being mistreated by the police force, including the story of one woman from a remote southern town who had been beaten and held in solitary confinement for riding alone in the back of a taxi.

In May 2007, a man alleged to have alcohol in his home (Salman Al-Huraisi) was reported by Arab News to have been arrested and beaten to death in his own home by CPVPV members in the Al Oraija district of Riyadh. "The father of the deceased said that commission members continued to beat his handcuffed son, even though he was already covered in blood, until he died" at the Oraija CPVPV center in Riyadh. Another man who died while in custody of the CPVPV was Ahmed Al-Bulawi. He was a driver for a woman with whom he was accused of being in a state of seclusion (when a man and an unrelated woman are together) and died after being taken to a CPVPV center in Tabuk in June 2007. According to Irfan Al-Alawi, "in both cases, the families of the victims took the mutawiyin to court, and in both instances (as in others) charges against the mutawiyin were postponed indefinitely or dropped."

A case of "sorcery" that led to a sentence of death which was overturned was that of Ali Hussain Sibat, the Lebanese host of the popular TV psychic call-in show aired on satellite TV across the Middle East. Sibat was arrested in Medina by the CPVPV in May 2008, while visiting Saudi Arabia to perform the Umrah pilgrimage. Sibat was charged with "sorcery" for making predictions and giving advice to the audience on his show. On 9 November 2009, after court hearings not open to the public or a defense lawyer Sibat was sentenced to death. The case was upheld on appeal but after an international outcry was overturned by the Supreme Court on 11 November 2010. The case was controversial in part because neither the defendant or "victims" were Saudis, and the "crime" was not committed in Saudi Arabia.

Mutaween suppression of religious activity by non-Muslims in Saudi Arabia is also controversial. Asia News alleges that "at least one million" Roman Catholics in the kingdom are being "denied pastoral care ... none of them can participate in mass while they are in Saudi Arabia ... Catholicism is banned for their children – nearly 100,000 – is banned." It reports the arrest of a Catholic priest for saying mass. On 5 April 2006 a Catholic priest, "Fr. George [Joshua] had just celebrated mass in a private house when seven religious policemen (muttawa) broke into the house together with two ordinary policemen. The police arrested the priest and another person."

In August 2008, a young Saudi woman who had converted to Christianity was reportedly burnt to death after having her tongue cut out by her father, a member of the committee, though it was not an officially sanctioned act of punishment.

In January 2013, the CPVPV marched into an educational exhibit of dinosaurs at a shopping center, "turned off the lights and ordered everyone out, frightening children and alarming their parents". It was not clear why the exhibit—which had been "featured at shopping centres across the Gulf for decades"—was closed, and Saudis speculated irreverently as to the reason on Twitter.

In September 2013 the entrance of a Saudi religious police building "was intentionally set on fire by assailants", according to the Hai'a. No one was hurt and no further information was provided by the police. In early 2014, the head of Hai'a, Sheikh Abdul Latif al-Sheikh was quoted in the Okaz daily newspaper as saying that "there are advocates of sedition within the Commission" for the Promotion of Virtue and Prevention of Vice, and promised to remove them.

=== Internal dispute ===
In 2009, the head of the Hai'a in Mecca, Sheikh Ahmad Qasim al Ghamdi, stated that there was nothing wrong with men and women mixing in public places, and instructed his mutawa'a to not interfere with mixing. However religious conservatives pressured the national head of the Hai'a to fire him. Hours after the firing of the Sheikh Al Ghamdi, the Hai'a issued an embarrassing retraction: "The information sent out today concerning administrative changes at some Hai'a offices, particularly those concerning Mecca and Hail, was inaccurate and the administration has requested editors not to publish it." However the firing and the retraction of the firing became "major news". "Outraged conservatives went to Sheiksh Al Ghamdi's home, demanding to 'mix' with his females ... still other outraged opponents scrawled graffiti on his home," according to journalist Karen Elliott House.

=== Involvement in politics ===
Other accusations leveled at the CPVPV include that some of its members have been involved in political subversion, and/or are ex-convicts/prisoners who became Hafiz (i.e. memorized the Quran) to reduce their prison sentences. Author Lawrence Wright has written of a conflict between the Mutaween and at least one allied imam and Turki bin Faisal Al Saud, the head of the Presidency of General Intelligence (Al Mukhabarat Al A'amah) between 1977 and 2001. After an imam denounced a female charitable organizations run by some of Turki's sisters and accused them of being whores during a Friday sermon, Turki demanded and received an apology. He then "secretly began monitoring members of the muttawa. He learned that many of them were ex-convicts whose only job qualification was that they had memorized the Quran to reduce their sentences." But Turki believed they had become "so powerful" they "threatened to overthrow the government." (Another description of the social background of CPVPV members—by Ali Shihabi, "a Saudi financier and pro-Muhammed bin Salman commentator"—is that their ranks are drawn from "the losers in school" who having been ignored by "cute girls" and not invited to parties "no one wanted them at" during their time as students, then sought jobs where they could take revenge on the socially successful by harassing attractive women and breaking into parties and shutting them down.)

Another instance when the CPVPV has opposed the Saudi government came in 2005 when the Minister of Labor announced a policy of staffing lingerie shops with women. The policy was intended to give employment to some of the millions of adult Saudi women at home (14.6% of Saudi women work in the public and private sectors in the kingdom), and to prevent mixing of the sexes in public (ikhtilat), between male clerks and women customers. Conservative Saudis opposed the policy maintaining that for a woman to work outside the house was against her fitrah (natural state). The few shops that employed women were "quickly closed" by the Hai'i who supported the conservative position.

However, in 2011, during the Arab Spring, King Abdullah issued another decree giving lingerie shops—and then shops and shop departments specializing in other products for women, such as cosmetics, abayas and wedding dresses—one year to replace men workers with women. Further clashes followed between conservatives and Hai'a men on the one hand, and the ministry, women customers and employees at female-staffed stores on the other. In 2013, the Ministry and the Hai'a leadership met to negotiate new terms. In November 2013, 200 religious police signed a letter stating that female employment was causing such a drastic increase in instances of ikhtilat, that "their job was becoming impossible."

=== Political use ===
According to one journalist with many years of experience in Saudi Arabia, Karen Elliott House, the Hai’a are sometimes used to balance the policies of the government; specifically a loose rein on the Hai'a acts to calm the displeasure of the strong religious conservative forces in Saudi society. When the king dismissed a member of the Council of Senior Religious Scholars in 2009 for condemning gender mixing at King Abdullah University of Science and Technology, he compensated for it by doing "nothing to curb the country's religious police from roaming the kingdom's streets and harassing ordinary Saudis mixing with anyone of the opposite genders".

== Other similar groups ==
Outside Saudi Arabia, in Iran, the Guidance Patrol functions as the country's main public religious police, imposing Islamic dress codes and norms in most public places. The Islamic Emirate of Afghanistan, also has a "Ministry for the Propagation of Virtue and the Prevention of Vice" with very similar religious policing functions.

There is also a type of police in Indonesia called the religious police; they enforce Islamic laws in the Islamic majority Aceh province. They are known for being very strict.

== See also ==
- Enjoining what is right and forbidding what is wrong (Promotion of Virtue and Prevention of Vice)
- Ministry for the Propagation of Virtue and the Prevention of Vice (Afghanistan)
- Committee for the Propagation of Virtue and the Prevention of Vice (Gaza Strip)
- Guidance Patrol, Iran's morality police
- Honour killing
- New York Society for the Suppression of Vice
- Secret police
- Islamic religious police
- Sharia
- Wahhabi movement

== Bibliography ==
- Cook, Michael (2003). Forbidding Wrong in Islam, an Introduction. Cambridge University Press.<
- Lacey, Robert (1981). The Kingdom. New York and London: Harcourt Brace Javonoich.
