= Feminism in Saudi Arabia =

Feminism in Saudi Arabia dates back to the ancient, pre-Roman Nabataean Kingdom in which women were independent legal persons. Twenty-first century feminist movements in Saudi Arabia include the women to drive movement and the anti male-guardianship campaign. Madawi al-Rasheed argued in 2019 that the Saudi feminist movement was "the most organised and articulate civil society" in Saudi Arabia.

== Nabataea ==
In 2007, Hatoon al-Fassi, an associate professor of women's history at King Saud University, published her research into the status of women in the pre-Islamic Arabian kingdom of Nabataea as the book Women in Pre-Islamic Arabia: Nabataea. Some of the evidence she used included coins and inscriptions on tombs and monuments written in ancient Greek and Semitic. She found that women were independent legal persons, and were able to sign contracts in their own name, in contrast to women in modern Saudi Arabia, who as of 2011 require the presence of male guardians. Al-Fassi says that ancient Greek and Roman law gave less rights to women than they had in Nabataea, that "an adaptation of Greek and Roman laws was inserted in Islamic law", and that "it's an ancient adaptation, that [Islamic] scholars are not aware of, and they would be really shocked."

== Women to drive movement ==
Up until June 2018, Saudi Arabia was the only country in the world where women were banned from driving motor vehicles. The women to drive movement (Arabic: قيادة المرأة في السعودية qiyādat al-marʾa fī as-Suʿūdiyya) was a campaign established by Saudi women claiming for the right to allow women driving motor vehicles on public roads, This campaign started in 1990 when dozens of women drove in Riyadh were arrested and had their passports confiscated. In 2007, Wajeha al-Huwaider and other women petitioned King Abdullah for women's right to drive, and a film of al-Huwaider driving on International Women's Day 2008 attracted international media attention.

In 2011, the Arab Spring motivated some women, including al-Huwaider and Manal al-Sharif, to organise a more intensive driving campaign, and about seventy cases of women driving were documented from 17 June to late June. In late September, Shaima Jastania was sentenced to ten lashes for driving in Jeddah, although the sentence was later overturned. Two years later, another campaign to defy the ban targeted 26 October 2013 as the date for women to start driving. Three days before, in a "rare and explicit restating of the ban", an Interior Ministry spokesman warned that "women in Saudi are banned from driving and laws will be applied against violators and those who demonstrate support." Interior Ministry employees warned leaders of the campaign individually not to drive on 26 October, and in the Saudi capital police road blocks were set up to check for women drivers.

On 26 September 2017, King Salman issued an order to allow women to drive in Saudi Arabia, with new guidelines to be created and implemented by June 2018. Women to drive campaigners were ordered not to contact media and in May 2018, several, including Loujain al-Hathloul, Eman al-Nafjan, Aisha Al-Mana, Aziza al-Yousef and Madeha al-Ajroush, were detained. The ban was officially lifted on 24 June 2018, while many of the women's rights activists were under arrest during the first phase of the 2018–2019 Saudi crackdown on feminists.

== Anti male-guardianship campaign ==
The anti male-guardianship campaign by Saudi Arabia women and their male supporters opposes the requirement to obtain permission from their male guardian for activities such as getting a job, travelling internationally or getting married. Wajeha al-Huwaider deliberately tried to travel internationally without male guardianship permission in 2009 and encouraged other women to do likewise. Women activists wrote a letter to the Saudi Minister of Labor and brought media attention to the issue in 2011. A 14,000-signature petition was given to royal authorities by Aziza al-Yousef in 2016 following a Human Rights Watch report on male guardianship.

During 2018–2019, a crackdown took place against the activists, many of whom had been active during the women to drive movement. Some of the women activists were tortured, with some of the torture supervised by Saud al-Qahtani, a close advisor of Crown Prince Mohammad bin Salman.

In August 2019, a royal decree was published in the Saudi official gazette Um al-Qura that would allow Saudi women over 21 to obtain passports and travel abroad without male guardian permission. The decree also gave women the rights to register a marriage, divorce or birth or obtain official family documents; and gave the mother the right to be a legal guardian of a child.

Madawi al-Rasheed interpreted the weakening of the guardianship system as the "second victory" of the Saudi feminist movement, following the June 2018 lifting of the women driving ban. She referred to remaining guardianship restrictions including the need for male guardian permission to marry, leave prison or a domestic violence shelter, and to work, study or seek medical care. Al-Rasheed argued that many of the anti male-guardianship campaigners wouldn't be "able to celebrate" the new announcement, due to imprisonment, travel bans or exile. As of 2 August 2019, Loujain al-Hathloul, Samar Badawi and Nassima al-Sada remained under arrest, several of the other women detained in the first half of 2018 had been released while their trials continued, and a total of 14 of the March/April 2019 detainees remained imprisoned without charge.

== Significance of the Saudi feminist movement ==
Madawi al-Rasheed argued in 2019 that the Saudi feminist movement was "the most organised and articulate civil society" in Saudi Arabia. She argued that the Saudi feminist movement obtained support from global feminist movements and popularised human rights concepts beyond equality between men and women. She stated that Saudi-feminist inspired human rights language "spread beyond the control" of Saudi authorities, becoming "the regime's nightmare". She argued that the fear of this uncontrolled spread of human rights concepts was the reason behind 2018–2019 Saudi crackdown on feminists.
