= Nassima al-Sadah =

Shia human rights writer and activist

- نسيمة السادة
- Born: 13 August 1974 (age 51)
- Occupations: Shia human rights writer and activist
- Known for: Campaigning for civil and political rights, women's rights and the rights of the Shi'a minority in the eastern province Qatif, Saudi Arabia
- Criminal status: Arrested on July 30, 2018 by Saudi authorities in a broader "government crackdown" on "activists, clerics and journalists"

Nassima al-Sadah (also al-Sada or al-Sasa, Arabic: نسيمة السادة; born 13 August 1974) is a Shia human rights writer and activist from the "restive Shi'ite-majority" eastern province Qatif, Saudi Arabia. She has "campaigned for civil and political rights, women's rights and the rights of the Shi'a minority" in the eastern province Qatif, Saudi Arabia for many years. She ran as a candidate in the 2015 Saudi Arabian municipal elections but was disqualified. Sadah and another prominent activist, Samar Badawi, were arrested on July 30, 2018, by Saudi authorities in a broader "government crackdown" on "activists, clerics and journalists."

== Background ==
According to the Committee to Protect Journalists (CPJ), Sadah, as a columnist and commentator for the Saudi news website Juhaina, wrote about human rights—specifically women's rights including the political participation of women—Saudi nationality laws of Saudi Arabia, and the U.N. campaign to end violence against women. Sadah, like other women's rights activists, campaigned to abolish the male guardianship system and the right to drive. Without the consent of a male relative, women are not allowed to make major decisions.

== Women2Drive ==
In 2012, Nassima al-Sadah filed a lawsuit "against the traffic department of the interior ministry at the Dammam court" in Eastern Province" as part of a larger campaign to "get behind the wheel" and revive the women to drive campaign that gained international attention during the 2011–12 Saudi Arabian protests of the Arab Spring. Manal al-Sharif and Samar Badawi had already filed similar lawsuits. Women were granted the right to drive in Saudi Arabia in June 2018.

== Arrests ==
According to Human Rights Watch (HRW), on July 30, 2018, Sadah and Samar Badawi, both prominent activists, were arrested by Saudi authorities in a "government crackdown" on "activists, clerics and journalists", including many activists of the Saudi anti male-guardianship campaign. Between May 2018 and February 2019, "at least 15 human rights activists, including several women human rights defenders [were] detained without charge in Saudi Arabia." (Note: Ten other women's rights activists were arrested in the crackdown prior to the arrest of Sadah and Badawi, including Eman al-Nafjan, Loujain al-Hathloul, Aziza al-Yousef, Aisha al-Manea, Ibrahim Modeimigh and Mohammed al-Rabea.) Amnesty International (AI) reported that Nassima al-Sada, who, as of February 2019, has been held in prison since July 2018 without charges or a trial, had been placed in solitary confinement in early February 2019 in al-Mabahith Prison, before being transferred to al-Ha'ir Prison in Riyadh.

=== Allegations of torture ===
According to their November 20, 2018 report based on three separate testimonies, AI said that the activists held in al-Mabahith Prison were "repeatedly tortured by electrocution and flogging, leaving some unable to walk or stand properly." According to The Washington Post, a Saudi official denied that torture was condoned by the state. According to a Human Rights Watch (HRW) March 7 statement reported in The New York Times, "Saudi interrogators [reportedly] tortured at least four of the women with electric shocks, and by whipping their thighs and sexually harassing and assaulting them."

=== Release ===
In June 2021, she has been released alongside Samar Badawi after completing her prison sentence.

== Trial ==
According to The Washington Post, the trial for ten of the women rights activists—including Samar Badawi and Nassima al-Sadah—began on March 13, 2019.

== Response ==
Amnesty International (AI) described the crackdown as an "unprecedented level of persecution of human rights defenders in Saudi Arabia" (Note: Badawi's brother Raif is in prison in Saudi Arabia. His "wife, Ensaf Haidar, and their three children have been living in Quebec, Canada, since 2015, where they fled to escape further persecution. On Canada Day July 1, 2018, Haidar and the children became Canadian citizens." VOX) (Note: Women "still need the approval of male guardians to travel or study outside the country, or even get a passport.") One year following the arbitrary detention of Saudi Arabia’s leading women human rights defenders, Amnesty International called for the immediate and unconditional release of Loujain al-Hathloul, Iman al-Najfan, Aziza alYousef, Samar Badawi, Nassima al-Sada and all other human rights defenders detained and facing trial for their peaceful human rights work. and described the arrests of the "human rights defenders" engaged in "peaceful human rights work" as "arbitrary." In March 2019, Amnesty International called "the immediate and unconditional release of Loujain al-Hathloul, Iman al-Najfan, Aziza alYousef, Samar Badawi, Nassima al-Sada and all other human rights defenders ".

According to an August 7, 2018 in the National Post, Canada's Foreign Affairs Minister Chrystia Freeland "openly criticized the Saudis" for the arrests. Saudi Arabia retaliated for "Canada’s "interference" by expelling the Canadian ambassador and freezing all new trade between the countries."

On International Women's Day March 2019, the CPJ highlighted the number of female journalists who remained in prisons around the world, listing Nassima al-Sadah specifically.

According to a March 7, 2019 article in The New York Times, in a "landmark initiative", 36 member nations (Note: The countries signing the statement were Australia, Austria, Belgium, Bulgaria, Canada, Croatia, Czech Republic, Cyprus, Denmark, Estonia, Finland, France, Germany, Greece, Hungary, Iceland, Ireland, Italy, Latvia, Liechtenstein, Lithuania, Luxembourg, Malta, Monaco, Montenegro, Netherlands, New Zealand, Norway, Poland, Portugal, Romania, Slovakia, Slovenia, Spain, Sweden and the United Kingdom.) of the 47-member United Nations Human Rights Council (UNHRC) rebuked Saudi Arabia "for its aggressive crackdown on free expression." It was the first time "states had ever confronted Saudi Arabia", who is a UNHRC member, over its human rights record. The UNHRC statement specifically named Loujain al-Hathloul, Eman al-Nafjan, Aziza al-Yousef, Nassima al-Sadah, Samar Badawi, Nouf Abdelaziz, Hatoon al-Fassi, Mohammed al-Bajadi, Amal al-Harbi and Shadan al-Anezi, all of whom were arrested in the May 2018 crackdown.

== See also ==
- Qatif conflict
