= Human Rights Commission (Saudi Arabia) =

- Formation: 2005; 20 years ago
- Founded at: Saudi Arabia
- Purpose: Human rights protection (disputed)
- Headquarters: Saudi Arabia, Riyadh
- Chairwoman of the Board: Hala al-Tuwaijri
- Website: hrc.gov.sa

The Human Rights Commission (HRC; Arabic: هيئة حقوق الإنسان) is a Saudi government organization established on 12 September 2005 by the decision of the council of ministers. It claims to be independent of the Saudi government. The Commission states its aim as the protection and promotion of human rights in line with international standards.

The Commission's official findings have consistently supported statements made by the Saudi government. For instance, in March 2019, the Human Rights Commission defended the Saudi authorities' refusal to allow an international investigation into the 2 October 2018 assassination of Jamal Khashoggi.

== Aims ==
The Commission states that it seeks to promote, defend and protect human rights in Saudi Arabia. It states that it is an independent organization, ensuring that all government entities are accomplishing the laws and regulations of human rights. The Commission states that it has the right, without any prior permission, to visit prisons at any time to ensure the implementation of human rights.

The European Saudi Organisation for Human Rights states that the Commission's activities aim to obscure and draw attention away from Saudi human rights violations. It criticized the Commission for making false and formulaic claims: for instance, they say it praised the Juveniles Law of March 2018, which prevented the execution of those who were minors at the time of their crime, as a success, while not mentioning that Saudi Arabia executed six underage people in April 2019.

== Structure ==
The Commission is governed by a board of directors chaired by the head of commission, and with a membership of full- and (non-voting) part-time members. All members are appointed by the President of the Council of Ministers of Saudi Arabia, except for the Chairman and Vice-chairman, who are appointed by royal order. All members of the council of ministers are also appointed, and dismissed, by royal order.

In August 2019, Awwad Alawwad was appointed head of commission, by royal decree, with the rank of minister. In 22 September 2022, Saudi Arabia has appointed the first woman, Hala al-Tuwaijri, as the new head of the Human Rights Commission with the rank of a minister.

=== Public-relations spending ===
According to ALQST, the Human Rights Commission hired the US public relations firm Qorvis in 2020, for an annual sum of $684,000.

== Actions ==
=== Nazia Quazi, 2010 ===
In 2009-2010, the Commission indicated that it was unable to help Nazia Quazi, a dual Canadian and Indian citizen, to return to her home in Canada. She was being held against her will in Saudi Arabia by her father, whom she claims confiscated her identity documents and credit cards, threatened her with a knife, and attempted to forcibly marry her to someone she does not know.

=== Mass executions 2016 ===
in 2016, the Commission publicly supported mass executions. A meeting between Canadian public officials and Commission members was criticized by human-rights advocates, for treating the Commission as a serious watchdog.

=== Feminists arrested in 2018 ===
In December 2018, the Commission visited Dhahban Central Prison and interviewed Loujain al-Hathloul and some of the other detainees of the 2018–2019 Saudi crackdown on feminists. The visit was part of an investigation into allegations that torture was used against the women; Saud al-Qahtani, a close advisor to crown prince Mohammed bin Salman, had allegedly been present at some of the torture sessions. Al Jazeera English judged it unlikely that the commission's investigation would lead to criminal charges against the torturers, and quoted a Saudi official who stated in reference to the commission's investigation, "I don't see how they will hold anyone accountable if they already publicly denied that the torture ever happened."

An unidentified source who heard the testimony told the Wall Street Journal that at least eight of the 18 activists interviewed had been physically abused, and that Saud al-Qahtani had threatened to rape Loujain al-Hathloul, kill her, and throw her into the sewage. Aziza al-Yousef, Eman al-Nafjan, and Samar Badawi were also said to have been tortured.

=== 2019: statements on Jamal Khashoggi ===
In March 2019, at a meeting of the United Nations Human Rights Council (UNHRC), the head of the Saudi Human Rights Commission at the time, Bandar bin Mohammed al-Aiban, called the 2 October 2018 assassination of Jamal Khashoggi an "unfortunate accident" and opposed international investigation of the assassination. Al-Aiban claimed that three hearings had taken place in an internal Saudi court case dealing with the case, with the suspects' lawyers present. He stated that none of the suspects had been tortured. He stated, "We have taken those measures required for us to solve this heinous crime" and that the reason for Saudi Arabia refusing an international investigation was that that would constitute foreign interference and "doubting the integrity of [the Saudi] judicial apparatus."

=== Sales of kafala workers, 2019 actions ===
The kafala system used for Foreign workers in Saudi Arabia gives sponsoring employees control over the worker's employment, allowing them to transfer the sponsorship without government intervention, including for profit. There are a large number of ads offering kalafa workers for sale or rent, and some apps have categories for such transactions. The Commission took steps to curb the publishing of these ads, and later met with some workers. They have said that they will prosecute anyone advertising the "sale, renting and sponsorship change of domestic workers in an illegal way."
