= Hatoon al-Fassi =

Saudi Arabian historian, author and women's rights activist

Hatoon Ajwad al-Fassi هتون أجواد الفاسي
- Born: 1964; Jeddah, Saudi Arabia
- Occupation: Assistant professor

Hatoon Ajwad al-Fassi (هتون أجواد الفاسي) is a Saudi Arabian historian, author and women's rights activist. She is an associate professor of women's history at King Saud University in Saudi Arabia, where she has been employed since 1989 and at the International Affairs Department at Qatar University. At the university, al-Fassi carries out historical research. Based on her research into the pre-Islamic Arabian kingdom of Nabataea, al-Fassi claims that women in the ancient kingdom had more independence than women in modern Saudi Arabia. Al-Fassi was active in women's right to vote campaigns for the 2005 and 2011 municipal elections and was active in a similar campaign for the 2015 municipal elections. She was arrested in late June 2018 as part of a crackdown on women's rights activists and was released almost a year later, in early May 2019.

In November 2018, while still in jail, she was awarded the MESA Academic Freedom Award for 2018.

== Family origin ==
Hatoon al-Fassi is a member of the traditional Sufi Al-Fassi family from Makkah, that descends from the Sharifi house of Muhammad that belongs to the Hassani Idrisids. Through her father Sheikhus Sujjadah Ajwad al-Fassi and his father Sheikh Abdullah al-Fassi, she is a great-great-granddaughter of Qutbul Ujood Imam Muhammad al-Fassi, the founder and spiritual head of the Fassiyah branch of the Shadhiliyya Sufi order, the twenty-first Khalifa (representative) of Imam Shadhili. She is thus a direct descendant of the Islamic prophet Muhammad. Her mother is Sheikha Samira Hamed Dakheel, who belongs to the branch of the Hijazi tribe of Harb that resided in Jeddah. She has a brother, Sheikh Muhammad Ajwad al-Fassi, a lawyer and a sister, Hawazan Ajwad al-Fassi, a poet.

== Education and academic career ==
Al-Fassi was raised in a family that encouraged her to think independently of school and media ideas about women's rights. She obtained undergraduate degrees in history in 1986 and 1992 from King Saud University (KSU) and a PhD in ancient women's history from the University of Manchester in 2000.

Al-Fassi has been employed at KSU since 1989, with lecturer status as a KSU faculty member since 1992, carrying out historical research into women's history. She has not been allowed to teach at KSU since 2001. Since 2008, she has had the status of an assistant professor of women's history at KSU and since 2013 was promoted to an associate professor.

=== Women in Pre-Islamic Arabia: Nabataea ===
In 2007, al-Fassi published her research into the status of women in the pre-Islamic Arabian kingdom of Nabataea as the book Women in Pre-Islamic Arabia: Nabataea. Some of the evidence she used included coins and inscriptions on tombs and monuments written in ancient Greek and Semitic. She found that women were independent legal persons able to sign contracts in their own name, in contrast to women in modern Saudi Arabia, who require male guardians to sign contracts. Al-Fassi says that ancient Greek and Roman law gave less rights to women than they had in Nabataea, that "an adaptation of Greek and Roman laws was inserted in Islamic law", and that "it's an ancient adaptation, that [Islamic] scholars are not aware of, and they would be really shocked."

Al-Fassi also argues that Nabataea "has weakened the idea that Arabians were merely or essentially nomads, by having an Arabian urbanized state".

== Women's rights activities ==
=== 2005 municipal elections ===
Al-Fassi was active in organising would-be women candidates for the 2005 municipal elections. Election organisers did not allow women to participate, citing practical reasons. Al-Fassi felt that authorities giving a practical reason for non-participation of women rather than a religious reason constituted a success for women's campaigning, since arguing against practical objections is easier than arguing against religious objections.

=== Women's rights at mosques ===
In 2006, Al-Fassi objected to a proposal to change the rules of women's access at the Masjid al-Haram in Mecca that had been made without women's participation.

=== 2011 municipal elections ===
Since early 2011, al-Fassi has participated in the "Baladi" women's rights campaign, which called for women to be allowed to participate in the September 2011 municipal elections. She stated that women's participation in the 2011 election "would show that Saudi Arabia is serious about its claims of reform". She described the authorities' decision not to accept women's participation in the election was "an outrageous mistake that the kingdom is committing".

Al-Fassi stated that women had decided to create their own municipal councils in parallel to the men-only elections and that women creating their own municipal councils or participating in "real elections" were both legal under Saudi law. Electoral commission head al-Dahmash agreed.

In April, al-Fassi said that there was still time before the September election for women to be allowed to take part. She stated, "We are putting all the pressure that is in our power, bearing in mind that it is not that easy in a country such as Saudi Arabia where freedom of assembly is not allowed and civil society is not yet fully-fledged."

=== 2015 municipal elections ===
Al-Fassi stated that Baladi had intended to organise training sessions for voter education in the 12 December 2015 municipal elections but was blocked by the Ministry of Municipal and Rural Affairs.

=== 2018 activists crackdown ===
Al-Fassi was arrested in late June, as part of a crackdown on women's rights activists that in May included the arrests of Aziza al-Yousef, Loujain al-Hathloul, Eman al-Nafjan, Aisha al-Mana and Madeha al-Ajroush. Her arrest took place days before the lifting of the Saudi ban on women driving. On 16 January 2019, Khaled Abou El Fadl, Noam Chomsky and 213 other academics sent an appeal to King Salman of Saudi Arabia describing al-Fassi's academic and women's rights achievements and calling for her and the other imprisoned women's rights activists to be freed.

== Media ==
Al-Fassi is a columnist for the Arabic language newspaper al-Riyadh. She has been featured and interviewed in many documentaries in major national, regional and international media on issues including Saudi women, history, archaeology, municipal elections.

== Awards ==
In November 2018, while still in jail, she was awarded the MESA Academic Freedom Award for 2018.
