= 2010s in Middle Eastern history =

Overview of Middle East, circa 2010

This article overviews the 2010s in Middle Eastern political history

== History by country ==
=== Bahrain ===
The 2011 Bahraini uprising were a series of demonstrations, amounting to a sustained campaign of non-violent civil disobedience and some violent resistance aimed at achieving greater political freedom and equality for the 70% Shia population. and inspired by the unrest of the 2011 Arab Spring and 2011–12 Iranian protests and escalated to daily clashes after the Bahraini government repressed the revolt with the support of the Gulf Cooperation Council and Peninsula Shield Force. This expanded to a call to end the monarchy of Hamad bin Isa Al Khalifa following a deadly night raid on 17 February 2011 against protesters at the Pearl Roundabout in the capital Manama, known locally as Bloody Thursday. Protesters in Manama camped for days at the Pearl Roundabout, which became the centre of the protests. After a month, the government of Bahrain requested troops and police aid from the Gulf Cooperation Council. On 14 March, 1,000 troops from Saudi Arabia and 500 troops from UAE entered Bahrain and crushed the uprising. A day later, King Hamad declared martial law and a three-month state of emergency. Pearl Roundabout was cleared of protesters and the iconic statue at its center was demolished.

Occasional demonstrations have continued since. After the state of emergency was lifted on 1 June 2011, the opposition party, Al Wefaq National Islamic Society, organized several weekly protests usually attended by tens of thousands. On 9 March 2012, over 100,000 attended and another on 31 August attracted tens of thousands. Daily smaller-scale protests and clashes continued, mostly outside Manama's business districts. By April 2012, more than 80 had died. The police response was described as a "brutal" crackdown on "peaceful and unarmed" protesters, including doctors and bloggers. The police carried out midnight house raids in Shia neighbourhoods, beatings at checkpoints and denial of medical care in a campaign of intimidation. More than 2,929 people have been arrested, and at least five died due to torture in police custody. In early July 2013, Bahraini activists called for major rallies on 14 August under the title Bahrain Tamarod.

=== Iran ===
The 2011–2012 protests in Iran were a series of demonstrations in Iran which began on 14 February 2011, called "The Day of Rage". The protests followed the 2009–2010 Iranian election protests and were influenced by other concurrent protests in the region. The 2016 Cyrus the Great Revolt were pro-monarchy Iranian protest that took place at the Tomb of Cyrus the Great on Cyrus the Great Day. The protest was Iran's largest after the 2009 protests.

Public protests took place in several cities in Iran beginning on 28 December 2017 and continuing into 2018. The first protest took place in Mashhad, Iran's second-largest city by population, initially focused on the economic policies of the country's government; as protests spread throughout the country, their scope expanded to include political opposition to the theocratic regime of Iran and its longtime Supreme Leader, Ali Khamenei.

The 2019 Iranian protests were a series of civil protests occurring in multiple cities across Iran, initially from the 200% increase in fuel prices but later extended to an outcry against the current government in Iran and Supreme Leader Ali Khamenei. The Iranian government employed lethal tactics in order to shut down the protests including a nationwide internet shutdown, shooting protesters dead from rooftops, helicopters, and at close range with machine gun fire. Although there is currently no conclusive casualty count current estimates suspect the government killed well over 1,000 Iranian citizens. This series of protests have been categorized as the most violent and severe since the rise of Iran's Islamic Republic in 1979.

=== Iraq ===
The withdrawal of the United States troops from Iraq was mostly completed by December 2011, bringing an end to the Iraq War. The Iraqi insurgency was an insurgency that began in late 2011 after the end of the Iraq War and the withdrawal of U.S. troops from Iraq, resulting in violent conflict with the central government, as well as low-level sectarian violence among Iraq's religious groups. The insurgency was a direct continuation of events following the U.S.-led invasion of Iraq. Sunni militant groups stepped up attacks targeting the country's majority Shia population to undermine confidence in the Shia-led government and its efforts to protect people without coalition assistance.

The 2012–2013 Iraqi protests started on 21 December 2012 following a raid on the home of Sunni Finance Minister Rafi al-Issawi and the arrest of 10 of his bodyguards. Beginning in Fallujah, the protests afterwards spread throughout Sunni Arab parts of Iraq. The protests centered on the issue of the alleged sectarianism of Prime Minister Nouri al-Maliki. Pro-Maliki protests also took place throughout central and southern Iraq, where there is a Shia Arab majority. In April 2013, sectarian violence escalated after the 2013 Hawija clashes. The protests continued throughout 2013, and in December Maliki used security forces to forcefully close down the main protest camp in Ramadi, killing hundreds of civilian protesters in the process. Sunni groups, such as the Army of the Men of the Naqshbandi Order, took up arms in response, and joined forces with the General Military Council for Iraqi Revolutionaries (GMCIR), a militant group made up of former Ba'athists, to conduct a military campaign against the Iraqi government. The Islamic State of Iraq and the Levant (ISIL) would later grow out of this civil conflict, escalating into a full-scale war.

The 2019 Iraqi protests, also nicknamed the Tishreen Revolution and 2019 Iraqi Intifada, are an ongoing series of protests that consisted of demonstrations, marches, sit-ins and civil disobedience. They started on 1 October 2019, a date which was set by civil activists on social media, spreading over the central and southern provinces of Iraq, to protest 16 years of corruption, unemployment and inefficient public services, before they escalated into calls to overthrow the administration and to stop Iranian intervention in Iraq. The Iraqi government has been accused of using bullets, snipers, hot water and tear gas against protesters. Prime Minister Adil Abdul-Mahdi announced on November 29 that he would resign. According to the BBC, they call for the end of the political system which has existed since the US-led invasion ousted Saddam Hussein and has been marked by sectarian divides. It is the largest unrest since the Saddam Hussein government concluded.

The UN Envoy for Iraq, Jeanine Hennis-Plasschaert, called for renewed efforts to restore civil balance and protections for free speech.

=== Israel ===
Benjamin Netanyahu remained in the office of the Prime Minister throughout the decade, becoming the longest holder of the office. Under his watch, the Jewish settlement movement has grown and gained influence, with at least 2,000 new homes built on the Palestinian territories each year, leading to a declining possibility for a two-state solution in the Arab–Israeli conflict. In 2014, there was a war in Gaza over Hamas rocket firings into Israeli cities, with a final death toll of 2,100 Palestinians and 73 Israeli citizens. The 2018–19 Gaza border protests demanded a right of return for those displaced from their homes during Israel's founding. Israeli security forces responded by firing at the protesters, killing 60 in a single day.

In foreign policy, Israel continued the proxy conflict against Iran, with Israeli involvement in the Syrian Civil War and 2019 Israeli airstrikes in Iraq.

In 2019, the country entered a political crisis following two hung parliaments and corruption charges against Netanyahu. Both the April and September 2019 elections failed to produce a majority in the Knesset for either Netanyahu, or his challenger, Benny Gantz, a former general. In November, Netanyahu became the first sitting Israeli leader to be criminally prosecuted, with charges of bribery, fraud and breach of trust spanning several cases.

=== Saudi Arabia ===
On January 2, 2016, the Kingdom of Saudi Arabia carried out a mass execution of 47 imprisoned civilians convicted for terrorism in 12 provinces in the country. Forty-three were beheaded and four were executed by firing squads. Among the 47 people killed was Shia Sheikh Nimr al-Nimr. The execution was the largest carried out in the kingdom since 1980. His execution was condemned by religious and political figures and human rights groups as the largest carried out in the kingdom since 1980.

The 2017–19 Saudi Arabian purge was the mass arrest of a number of prominent Saudi Arabian princes, government ministers, and business people in Saudi Arabia on 4 November 2017 and the following few weeks after the creation of an anti-corruption committee led by Crown Prince Mohammed bin Salman. As many as 500 people were rounded up in the sweep. The arrests resulted in the final sidelining of the faction of the King Abdullah and Mohammed bin Salman's complete consolidation of control of all three branches of the security forces, making him the most powerful man in Saudi Arabia since his grandfather, the first King, Ibn Saud.

An assassination campaign against critics of the monarchy was allegedly carried out in parallel to the overt arrests of the purge, by the Tiger Squad, which was formed in 2017 and as of October 2018, consisted of 50 secret service and military personnel. The group members were recruited from different branches of the Saudi forces, directing several areas of expertise. The Tiger Squad allegedly assassinates dissidents using varying methods, such as planned car and aircraft accidents, house fires, and poisoning at hospitals under the pretenses of regular health checkups. The five-member squad were also the part of the 15-member death squad who assassinated Jamal Khashoggi.

The 2018–2019 Saudi crackdown on feminists consisted of waves of arrests of women's rights activists in Saudi Arabia involved in the women to drive movement and the Saudi anti male-guardianship campaign and of their supporters during 2018 and 2019. The crackdown was described in June 2018 by a United Nations special rapporteur as taking place "on a wide scale across" Saudi Arabia; the special rapporteur called for the "urgent release" of the detainees. Six of the women arrestees were tortured, some in the presence of Crown Prince advisor Saud al-Qahtani.

On 23 April 2019, the Kingdom of Saudi Arabia carried out a mass execution of 37 imprisoned civilians who had been convicted, 21 on the basis of confessions allegedly obtained under coercion and torture, for terrorism-related allegations in six provinces in the country. Fourteen of the people executed had been convicted in relation to their participation in the 2011–12 protests in Qatif, mostly on the basis of torture-induced confessions.

=== Syria ===
The 2019 Turkish offensive into north-eastern Syria is a cross-border military operation conducted by the Turkish Armed Forces (TAF) and the Syrian National Army (SNA) against the Syrian Democratic Forces (SDF) and later the Syrian Arab Army (SAA) in northeastern Syria.

On October 6, 2019, the Trump administration ordered American troops to withdraw from northeastern Syria, where the United States had been supporting its Kurdish allies. The military operation began on October 9, 2019, when the Turkish Air Force launched airstrikes on border towns. The conflict resulted in the displacement of over 300,000 people and has caused the death of more than 70 civilians in Syria and 20 civilians in Turkey.

According to the Turkish President Recep Tayyip Erdoğan, the operation is intended to expel the SDF—viewed as a terrorist organization by Turkey due to its ties with the Kurdistan Workers Party (PKK), but considered an ally against ISIL by the United States and its allies—from the border region as well as to create a 30 km-deep (20 mi) "safe zone" in Northern Syria where some of the 3.6 million Syrian refugees in Turkey would resettle. As the proposed settlement zone is heavily Kurdish demographically, this intention has been criticized as an attempt to force drastic demographic change, a criticism denied by Turkey by saying that it only intended to "correct" the demographics that Turkish officials stated were changed by the SDF.

The Syrian government initially criticized the Kurdish forces for the Turkish offensive, for their separatism and not reconciling with the government, while at the same time also condemning the foreign invasion in Syrian territory. However, a few days later, the SDF reached an agreement with the Syrian government, in which it would allow the Syrian Army to enter the SDF-held towns of Manbij and Kobanî in an attempt to defend the towns from the Turkish offensive. Shortly thereafter, Syrian state broadcaster SANA announced that Syrian Army troops had started to deploy to the country's north. Turkey and the SNA launched an offensive to capture Manbij on the same day.

On October 22, 2019, Russian President Vladimir Putin and Turkish President Recep Tayyip Erdoğan reached a deal to extend the ceasefire by 150 additional hours for SDF to move 30 kilometers away from the border area as well as from Tal Rifaat and Manbij. The terms of the deal also included joint Russian–Turkish patrols 10 kilometers into Syria from the border except in the city of Qamishli. The new ceasefire started at 12 pm local time on October 23.

Although the main combat phase did end, post ceasefire operations are still ongoing. As announced by Russia's Ministry of Defense on October 15, Russian forces have started to patrol the region along the line of contact between Turkish and Syrian forces, indicating that Russia is filling the security vacuum from the sudden US withdrawal. Alexander Lavrentiev, Russia's special envoy on Syria, warned that the Turkish offensive into Syria is unacceptable and stated that Russia is seeking to prevent conflict between Turkish and Syrian troops.

The Turkish operation received mixed responses by the international community. Including condemnations as well as support for the operation for the settlement of refugees in Northern Syria. While originally acknowledging Turkey's "right to defend itself", on October 15, Russia hardened its position against the operation and deployed troops. Ten European nations and Canada imposed an arms embargo on Turkey, while the U.S. imposed sanctions on Turkish ministries and senior government officials in response to the offensive in Syria. Likewise, Trump's sudden pullout of US forces in Syria was also criticized by journalists as a "serious betrayal to the Kurds" as well as a "catastrophic blow to US credibility as an ally and Washington's standing on the world stage". On November 19, the Defense Department inspector general released a report finding that the American withdrawal and subsequent Turkish incursion allowed ISIL to "reconstitute capabilities and resources within Syria and strengthen its ability to plan attacks abroad".

=== Turkey ===
The 2011–2012 Kurdish protests in Turkey were protests in Turkey, led by the Peace and Democracy Party (BDP), against restrictions of Kurdish rights by of the country's Kurdish minority's rights. In late 2012, the Turkish government began peace negotiations with the Kurdistan Workers Party (PKK) to end the Kurdish–Turkish conflict (1978–present). The ceasefire broke down in 2015, leading to a renewed escalation in conflict. Meanwhile, the Turkish involvement in the Syrian Civil War, with its focus on preventing the Syrian Democratic Forces from gaining ground on the Syria–Turkey border during the Syrian Civil War.

In the more recent years of Erdoğan's rule, Turkey experienced democratic backsliding and corruption. Starting with the anti-government protests in 2013, his government imposed growing censorship on the press and social media, temporarily restricting access to sites such as YouTube, Twitter and Wikipedia. This stalled negotiations related to Turkey's EU membership. A US$100 billion corruption scandal in 2013 led to the arrests of Erdoğan's close allies, and incriminated Erdoğan. After 11 years as head of government (Prime Minister), Erdoğan decided to run for president in 2014. At the time, the presidency was a somewhat ceremonial function. Following the 2014 elections, Erdoğan became the first popularly elected president of Turkey. The souring in relations with Gülen continued, as the government proceeded to purge his supporters from judicial, bureaucratic and military positions. Erdoğan's rule has been marked with increasing authoritarianism, expansionism, censorship and banning of parties or dissent.

In 2016, a coup attempt was launched against Erdogan, which failed. The attempt was carried out by a faction within the Turkish Armed Forces that organized themselves as the Peace at Home Council whose members have never been identified. They attempted to seize control of several places in Ankara, Istanbul, Marmaris and elsewhere, such as the Asian side entrance of the Bosphorus Bridge, but failed to do so after forces loyal to the state defeated them. The Council cited an erosion of secularism, elimination of democratic rule, disregard for human rights, and Turkey's loss of credibility in the international arena as reasons for the coup. The government said the coup leaders were linked to the Gülen movement, which is designated as a terrorist organization by the Republic of Turkey and led by Fethullah Gülen, a Turkish businessman and scholar who lives in Pennsylvania. During the coup attempt, over 300 people were killed and more than 2,100 were injured. Many government buildings, including the Turkish Parliament and the Presidential Palace, were bombed from the air.

Following the coup, mass arrests followed, with at least 40,000 detained, including at least 10,000 soldiers and, for reasons that remain unclear, 2,745 judges. 15,000 education staff were also suspended and the licenses of 21,000 teachers working at private institutions were revoked after the government stated they were loyal to Gülen. More than 77,000 people have been arrested and over 160,000 fired from their jobs, on reports of connections to Gülen. Erdoğan supported the 2017 referendum which changed Turkey's parliamentary system into a presidential system, thus setting for the first time in Turkish history a term limit for the head of government (two full five-year terms). This new system of government formally came into place after the 2018 general election, where Erdoğan became an executive president. His party however lost the majority in the parliament and is currently in a coalition (People's Alliance) with the Turkish nationalist MHP. Erdoğan has since been tackling, but also accused of contributing to, the Turkish currency and debt crisis of 2018, which has caused a significant decline in his popularity and is widely believed to have contributed to the results of the 2019 local elections, in which his party lost power in large cities such as Ankara and Istanbul to opposition parties for the first time in 15 years.

=== Yemen ===
The Saudi-led intervention in Yemen, is an intervention launched by Saudi Arabia in 2015, leading a coalition of nine countries from West Asia and Africa, in response to calls from the internationally recognized pro-Saudi president of Yemen Abdrabbuh Mansur Hadi for military support after he was ousted by the Houthi movement due to economic and political grievances, and fled to Saudi Arabia.

Code-named Operation Decisive Storm, the intervention is said to be in compliance with Article 2(4) of the UN Charter by the international community; but this has been contested by some academics. The intervention initially consisted of a bombing campaign on Houthi rebels and later saw a naval blockade and the deployment of ground forces into Yemen. The Saudi-led coalition has attacked the positions of the Houthi militia, and loyalists of the former President of Yemen, Ali Abdullah Saleh, allegedly supported by Iran (see Iran–Saudi Arabia proxy conflict).

Fighter jets and ground forces from Egypt, Morocco, Jordan, Sudan, the United Arab Emirates, Kuwait, Qatar, Bahrain, and Academi (formerly Blackwater) took part in the operation. Djibouti, Eritrea, and Somalia made their airspace, territorial waters, and military bases available to the coalition. The United States provided intelligence and logistical support, including aerial refueling and search-and-rescue for downed coalition pilots. It also accelerated the sale of weapons to coalition states and continued strikes against AQAP. The US and Britain have deployed their military personnel in the command and control centre responsible for Saudi-led air strikes on Yemen, having access to lists of targets.

The war has received widespread criticism and had a dramatic worsening effect on Yemen's humanitarian situation, that reached the level of a "humanitarian disaster" or "humanitarian catastrophe".

In 2019, the conflict's status was described as a "military stalemate for years".

In April 2019, Trump vetoed a bipartisan bill which would have ended US support for the Saudi-led military intervention. With 53 votes instead of the 67 needed, the United States Senate failed to override the veto. The legal arguments and policies of the Obama administration were cited as justification for the veto. The US Deputy Assistant Secretary of Defense Michael Mulroy stated that US support was limited to side-by-side coaching to mitigate civilian casualties and if the measure had passed it would do nothing to help the people of Yemen and may only increase civilian deaths. Mulroy supported the United Nations' peace talks and he pushed the international community to come together and chart a comprehensive way ahead for Yemen. Writing in The Nation, Mohamad Bazzi argued that Mulroy's defence of US support as necessary to limit civilian casualties was false, and that "Saudi leaders and their allies have ignored American entreaties to minimize civilian casualties since the war's early days".

== See also ==
- 2010s in history
