= Huda al-Daghfaq =

Saudi Arabian poet (born 1967)

- هدى الدغفق
- Born: 24 October 1967 (age 58)
- Education: King Saud University
- Occupations: Poet, journalist
- Years active: 1993 – present
- Known for: Saudi feminism and poetry
- Notable work: أشق البرقع أرى، ('I Tear the Burqa to See')

Huda Abdullah Al-Daghfaq (Arabic: هدى الدغفق; born 24 October 1967) is a Saudi Arabian poet, journalist, and feminist. She supports the removal of male guardianship from women and emphasises the importance of women as social and political decision-makers. Her memoir I Tear the Burqa to See has been described as an expression of the "existential battle" between her poetry and her cultural background.

== Biography ==
Al-Daghfaq was born on 24 October 1967. She earned a bachelor's degree in Arabic language from the University of Riyadh in 1989. After graduation she taught in secondary schools, but during this period, because of her poetry she was accused of modernism – which in Saudi Arabia at that time came with accusations of atheism. She published her collection, The Upward Shadow, in 1993. Volumes of her poetry have been translated into several languages. She has published two memoirs, the first when she was forty years old. She experiments with form in her autobiographical writing. Also a journalist, al-Daghfaq is one of several Saudi women poets who work in that field, with Hailah Abdullah Al-Khalaf citing her as an example alongside Khadeeja al-Amri, Fawziyya Abu Khalid and Ashjan al-Hindi.

Al-Daghfaq is a prominent Saudi feminist, considering women to be leaders of the Gulf region's movement. She supports the removal of guardianship from women and emphasises the importance of women as social and political decision-makers. At the Jeddah Literary Club, Al-Daghfaq drew controversy as she crossed the division between areas of the meeting segregated by gender and recited her poetry to both men and women.

== Reception ==
Su'ad al-Mana said that Al-Daghfaq's writing is part of a tradition of Saudi women poets that began in the 1970s, citing her 1993 collection The Upward Shadow as a significant work in this period. Her works have been compared to those of Iman al-Dabbagh, Ashjan al-Hindi, Sara al-Kathlan, Salwa Khamis, and Latifa Qari. She is one of a number of Saudi prose poets. Her work has been compared to that of Fawziyya Abu Khalid, Muhammed al-Dumaini and Ghassan al-Khunazi. Her memoir I Tear the Burqa to See was described by academic Wasfy Yassin Abbas as an expression of the "existential battle" between her poetry and her cultural background.

== Selected works ==
- الظل إلى أعلى (The Upward Shadow) – 1993
- امرأة لم تكن (A Woman Who Wasn't) – 2008
- ريشة لاتطير ، مختارات من ثلاث مجموعاتها شعرية، (A Feather Doesn't Fly) – 2008
- أشق البرقع أرى، (I Tear the Burqa to See) – 2012
