= 2015 Saudi Arabian municipal elections =

- 12 December 2015

2/3 of seats in 284 municipalities
- Turnout: 47%

Elections were held in Saudi Arabia on 12 December 2015 for municipal councils, which have limited decision-making powers on local issues such as rubbish collection and street maintenance. The previous two elections, in 2005 and 2011, were for half the council seats and were open to male candidates and voters only. The 2015 election was for two thirds of the council seats, on 284 municipal councils, with both male and female candidates and voters. This was the first election in Saudi Arabia in which women were allowed to vote, the first in which they were allowed to run for office, and the first in which women were elected as politicians.

== Background ==
Half the seats in municipal councils in Saudi Arabia were chosen in men-only elections in 2005 and 2011. The municipal councils reportedly have "little power" in Saudi Arabia, an absolute monarchy. Saudi Arabian women campaigned for the right to participate in the 2011 elections, organizing through the "Baladi" (My Country) and Saudi Women's Revolution campaigns for women's right to participate. Several women tried to register as electors in Jeddah, Riyadh, and Dammam. A few days before the 2011 election took place, King Abdullah announced that women would be able to participate as voters and candidates in the 2015 election.

In the 2015 municipal elections, two-thirds of the council seats were elected positions, and women were allowed as candidates and voters.

== Preparations ==
Voter registration started on 16 August 2015 in Medina and Mecca, and elsewhere on 22 August, to continue for a 21-day period.

Two women voters registered in Medina and Mecca on 16 August. Hatoon al-Fassi of the Baladi campaign said that Baladi had intended to organize training sessions for voter education but was blocked by the Ministry of Municipal and Rural Affairs.

About 131,000 women and about 1.35 million men registered to vote.

== Candidates ==
=== Male candidates ===
There were 5,938 men registered as candidates.

=== Female candidates ===
There were 978 women registered as candidates; however, many were barred from registering by the authorities. No reasons were given; however, it was noted that a number of them were advocates for the expansion of women's rights in the Kingdom. Haifa al-Hababi, 36 years old as of August 2015, was a candidate. She stated, "Change the system. Change is life. The government has given us this tool and I intend to use it." Two women candidates were disqualified. Loujain al-Hathloul, who had been detained for two months after driving from the United Arab Emirates to Saudi Arabia in December 2015, was disqualified; Nassima al-Sadah, a Shia human rights activist from Qatif, was also disqualified.

As women in Saudi Arabia are not permitted to address men who are not related to them, women candidates could only speak directly to women voters. At men's campaign meetings, they had to either speak from behind a partition, or have a man read their speech on their behalf. Many women also stated they could not afford the high cost of running an election campaign.

== Results ==
The turnout for the election was reported as 47%, split down as 82% of the 132,000 female voters registered and 44% of the 1.35m male voters registered.

In results released to the Associated Press on 13 December, 20 female candidates were elected to the approximately 2,100 municipal council seats being contested. Salma bint Hizab al-Oteibi became the first elected female politician in Saudi Arabia as a result of the election, when she won a seat on the council in Madrakah in Mecca province.

== See also ==
- List of cities and towns in Saudi Arabia
- Timeline of women's suffrage
