= 2018–2019 Saudi crackdown on feminists =

Government action in Saudi Arabia

The 2018–2019 Saudi crackdown on feminists consisted of waves of arrests of women's rights activists in Saudi Arabia involved in the women to drive movement and the Saudi anti male-guardianship campaign and of their supporters during 2018 and 2019. The crackdown was described in June 2018 by a United Nations special rapporteur as taking place "on a wide scale across" Saudi Arabia; the special rapporteur called for the "urgent release" of the detainees. Six of the women arrestees were tortured, some in the presence of Crown Prince advisor Saud al-Qahtani.

== Background ==
According to Clarence Rodriguez, the 2018–2019 crackdown followed a wave of arrests in September 2017 of intellectuals and clerics, including the arrests of Abdulaziz al-Shubaily, a founding member of the Saudi Civil and Political Rights Association (ACPRA); Mustafa al-Hassan, an academic and novelist; and Essam al-Zamel, an entrepreneur. Rodriguez described the September 2017 arrests as a campaign of political repression by Crown Prince Mohammad bin Salman (MBS), in reaction to which Jamal Khashoggi left Saudi Arabia for exile in the United States.

== Arrest waves ==
Rodriguez described the 2018 arrests of the women activists as a "detonator" of the reputation of MBS as a reformer, arguing that MBS aimed to claim the credit for dropping the women driving ban.

=== January–June 2018 ===
Noha al-Balawi was detained in January 2018, the first in a 2018 wave of arrests of women's right activists involved in the women to drive movement and the anti male-guardianship campaign. She was questioned during her detention about her women's rights activities. In mid-May 2018, Aziza al-Yousef, Loujain al-Hathloul and Eman al-Nafjan, together with Aisha al-Mana, Madeha al-Ajroush and two male activists, were arrested by Saudi authorities. As of 22 May 2018, more anti male-guardianship campaigners had been arrested, bringing the total to 13. As of 25 May 2018, four of the women had been released.

Nouf Abdelaziz was arrested on 6 June 2018 after expressing support for seven of the activists arrested in May. Mayaa al-Zahrani was arrested later in May after she published online a letter written by Abdelaziz for release if arrested. Hatoon al-Fassi, a women's rights activist and an associate professor of women's history, was arrested around 27 June, not long after she had driven a car following the official lifting of the women's driving ban.

The wave of political arrests in 2018 extended beyond women's rights groups to other individuals making political statements against Mohammad bin Salman's policies. Economist Essam al-Zamil was charged with terrorism as a result of questioning plans involving the national oil company. Political prisoners were held without trial, and public figures, such as Salman al-Awdah, were "wanted dead", according to The Economist. Mohammed Saleh al-Bejadi, co-founder of the Saudi Arabian human rights organisation Saudi Civil and Political Rights Association (ACPRA), who had already been held in prison from 2011–2015, was arrested on 24 May 2018.

As of 27 June 2018, Al Jazeera English stated that nine of the activists, out of a total of 17, remained under arrest without contact with their families or lawyers. Al-Yousef was released from prison, without the charges against her being dropped, in late March 2019. As of 2 August 2019, Loujain al-Hathloul, Samar Badawi and Nassima al-Sada remained under arrest, while several of the other detained women had been released while their trials continued.

=== April 2019 ===
Twelve people, a pregnant woman and eleven men, involved in women's rights activities or supportive of the imprisoned activists were arrested on or around 4 April 2019. The arrestees, including two United States (US)–Saudi binational citizens, Badr al-Ibrahim and Salah al-Haidar, son of Aziza al-Yousef, were seen as not being "front-line activists", in the sense that they were not politically active on Twitter and were rarely quoted in non-Saudi media.

Other April detainees included writers Khadijah al-Harbi and her husband Thumar al-Marzouqi, Mohammed al-Sadiq, Andhullah al-Dehailan, Naif al-Hendas, Ayman al-Drees, Abdullah al-Shehri and Moqbel al-Saqqar. Fahal Abalkhail, who had supported the women to drive movement was also among the arrestees.

King Saud University lecturer Anas al-Mazraoui was earlier arrested in March after having stated the names of some of the imprisoned women's rights activists during a human-rights panel discussion at a book fair.

As of 2 August 2019, a total of 14 of the March/April detainees remained imprisoned without charge.

== Torture ==
Samar Badawi, al-Yousef, al-Nafjan, al-Hathloul, Shadan al-Onezi and Nouf al-Dosari were tortured during the detention, with Crown Prince advisor Saud al-Qahtani present at some of the torture sessions, Physical torture techniques included beating the women on their feet, giving them electric shocks and whipping them. The torture location was referred to as "the hotel" or "the officer's guesthouse". One of the women was photographed naked, one was sexually harassed, beaten and groped, one was stripped naked in front of interrogators. Several had black eyes, suffered from trembling, and were unable to walk or stand normally. One was told falsely that a family member had died.

Some of the women have testified about their torture in court. Testimony of torture was obtained independently by ALQST, Amnesty International and Human Rights Watch. An official report on the investigation by the widely-condemned Saudi Human Rights Commission found no torture, contradicting an unofficial report leaked to The Wall Street Journal, which also alleged that Saud al-Qahtani personally made graphic sexual and physical threats.

== Aims of the crackdown ==
Human Rights Watch (HRW) interpreted the arrests as being aimed at frightening the activists, stating, "The message is clear that anyone expressing skepticism about the crown prince's [human] rights agenda faces time in jail." The arrested campaigners were severely criticised in semi-official media as "traitors". Social anthropologist Madawi al-Rasheed interpreted the May arrests as being part of Crown Prince Mohammad bin Salman's aim to keep all the credit for allowing women to drive starting from 24 June 2018. Rothna Begum of HRW said that since the arrests and the public smearing of the activists' reputations, women's Twitter activity was quiet.

ALQST described the series of arrests as "unprecedented targeting of women human rights defenders". In June 2018, United Nations special rapporteurs described the detentions and arrests taking place as a "crackdown" taking place "on a wide scale across" Saudi Arabia and called for the "urgent release" of the detainees.

== International support for the detainees ==
On 2 January 2019, a group of UK members of parliament and international lawyers requested permission to visit the women detainees. However, there was no response from the Saudi ambassador Prince Mohammed bin Nawwaf bin Abdulaziz. The UK panel that included former Conservative chair of the foreign affairs select committee Crispin Blunt concluded that the female detainees had been subjected to cruel and inhumane treatment, including assault, threats to life and solitary confinement.

On 14 May 2019, one year after the women human rights activists were arrested by the Saudi authorities, Amnesty International criticised Saudi Arabia's western allies, including the US, the UK and France for not doing anything for the "immediate and unconditional release" of the activists.

== See also ==
- Saudi crackdown on Islamic scholars
- 2017–19 Saudi Arabian purge
- 2019 Saudi Arabia mass execution
