= Jacob Riggs =

British cybersecurity researcher and ethical hacker

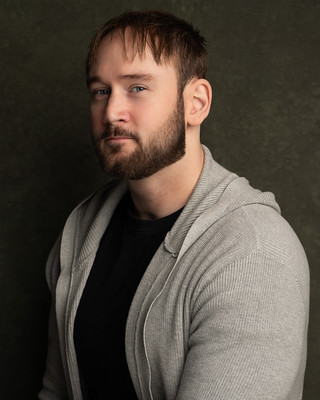
- Riggs in 2023
- Born: London, United Kingdom
- Occupation: Ethical hacker
- Known for: Deadswitch
- Website: jacobriggs.io

Jacob Riggs is a British ethical hacker, and cybersecurity expert, known as the founder of Deadswitch, a Dead man's switch designed for use by journalists, dissidents, and other at-risk individuals, and for being granted a visa following the responsible disclosure of a critical vulnerability in an Australian government system. He also helped in a collaborative investigation into former Saudi Arabian royal court advisor Saud al-Qahtani and his involvement with HackingTeam and the murder of journalist Jamal Khashoggi in 2018. He discovered a bug within Facebook and WhatsApp that provided unauthorized access to law enforcement portals used to submit sensitive data requests in 2020.

== Awards and recognition ==
- 2021: Received recognition from the National Cyber Security Centre - Netherlands (NCSC-NL), for identifying and reporting vulnerabilities within their critical infrastructure.
- 2021: Received $100,000 in prize money funded by Huntress Labs, an American cybersecurity firm founded by Kyle Hanslovan.
- 2021: Presented with a vulnerability disclosure hacker coin from the UK National Cyber Security Centre on behalf of the UK Ministry of Defence.
- 2021: Credited with Hall of Fame recognition by the United Nations.
- 2022: Presented with a trophy and formal letter of appreciation from Belastingdienst on behalf of the Dutch government.
- 2022: Awarded a limited edition solid gold coin, commemorating the life and legacy of the mathematician and codebreaker Alan Turing for disclosing a security vulnerability to the Royal Mint.
- 2025: Received Australia’s invitation-only 858 National Innovation Visa for internationally recognized cybersecurity achievement.
