= Lina al-Hathloul =

Saudi Arabian activist

- Occupation: Human rights activist
- Family: Loujain al-Hathloul (sister)

Lina al-Hathloul (also spelled Lina Alhathloul) is a Saudi human rights activist and the sister of Loujain al-Hathloul, the women's rights activist and political prisoner.

== Education ==
Al-Hathloul holds a Master of Arts in law from the Université libre de Bruxelles.

== Advocacy ==
After her sister had been kidnapped and imprisoned by the Saudi government for refusing to abide by the country's ban on women driving automobiles, Lina has taken up the cause of exposing the poor conditions of the Saudi prison system and the torture that inmates face. In addition to exposing the nation's human rights abuses, Lina and her brother aim to secure the release of Loujain, as well as other political prisoners. Lina Al-Hathloul now serves as Head of Monitoring and Advocacy at ALQST for Human Rights.

In 2022, she published a book with Uma Mishra-Newbery and Rebecca Green, named: "Loujain Dreams Of Sunflowers"
