= Rebecca Green =

American illustrator

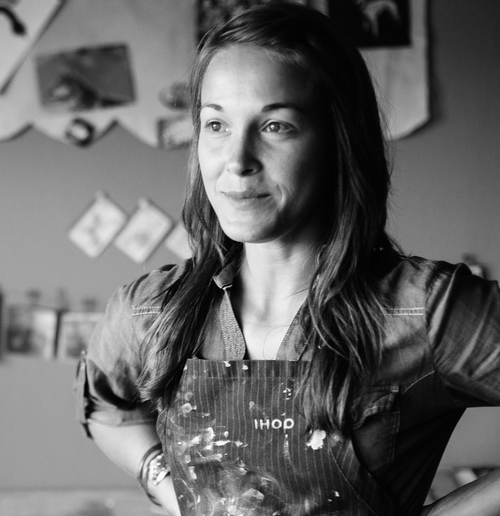
- Born: Rebecca Green; January 30, 1986 (age 40); Owosso, Michigan
- Education: B.F. A., Kendall College of Art and Design, 2010
- Known for: Children's book illustrations

Rebecca "Becca" Green is an American illustrator, author, and painter who is known for children's books.

== Biography ==
Rebecca Green was born in Owosso, Michigan. She has also lived in Osaka, Nashville, Phoenix, and Denver. She graduated from Kendall College of Art and Design with a bachelor of fine arts in illustration in 2010.

=== Career ===
Green was named 21 of 100 creative forces in Phoenix in the Phoenix New Times.

She has illustrated more than one dozen books written by other authors. She has written and illustrated one book, How to Make Friends with a Ghost (Tundra Books, 2017), which the Jim Henson Company began developing for a series in 2021.

Green is a member of the Society of Children's Book Writers and Illustrators.

==== Critical reception ====
Publishers Weekly wrote of Green's illustrations in Iqbal and His Ingenious Idea: How a Science Project Helps One Family and the Planet (Kids Can Press, 2018): "The stylized colored-pencil illustrations from Green offer realistic scenes of Bangladeshi village life in muted hues and portray the closeness of Iqbal’s family"; Kirkus Reviews wrote, "Green's illustrations are earthy and colorful and perfectly capture the soul of the story".

Publishers Weekly called her illustrations in A Year with Mama Earth (Eerdmans, 2019) as "stylized, textural". Kirkus Reviews noted her work in Becoming a Good Creature (HMH Books, 2020) was "visually pleasing illustrations... rendered in a warm, earth-hued palette, and they have an uncomplicated design that effectively complements the story’s wise, authentic narrative".

Kirkus Reviews said Green's work in Madame Saqui: Revolutionary Rope Dancer (Schwartz & Wade/Random, 2020) was "muted, stylized". About the same book, Publishers Weekly said, "mixed media illustrations by Green in dusky pastels provide period atmosphere with fancy costumes, dramatic lighting, and figures that look just a bit like marionettes".

The woodcut and German expressionistic appearance of the illustrations in Kafka and the Doll (Viking, 2021) made an impression on one reviewer. A starred review by Booklist noted, "Green tops off her muted scenes of button-eyed figures in, alternately, autumnal and far-flung settings."

In a starred review for A Bear Far from Home (Anne Schwartz/Random, 2022), Booklist wrote, "Green’s marvelous folk-style illustrations take their cues from medieval artwork, framing scenes with thick, gold borders and flowery flourishes". In another review, her work was noted for "presenting varied human skin tones throughout"; the review continues, "Green’s stylized gouache and pencil renderings complement through their use of ornate, medieval-inspired borders and floral flourishes".

Kirkus Reviews said Green's work in Loujain Dreams of Sunflowers: A Story Inspired by Loujain Alhathloul (minedition, 2022) was "beautifully representational".

Kirkus Reviews commented that her first book as both writer and illustrator, How to Make Friends with a Ghost (Tundra Books, 2017), had "a sophisticated, rather adult aesthetic."

== Selected works ==
=== As illustrator ===
- The Great Hibernation. Written by Tara Dairman. Wendy Lamb/Random, 2017.
- The Unicorn in the Barn. Written by Jacqueline Ogburn. HMH Books, 2017.
- The Glass Town Game. Written by Catherynne M. Valente. McElderry, 2017.
- From Far Away. Written by Robert Munsch & Saoussan Askar. Annick Press, 2017.
- How to Be a Good Creature: A Memoir in Thirteen Animals. Written by Sy Montgomery. Houghton Mifflin Harcourt, 2018.
- Iqbal and His Ingenious Idea: How a Science Project Helps One Family and the Planet. Written by Elizabeth Suneby. Kids Can Press, 2018.
- A Year with Mama Earth. Written by Rebecca Grabill. Eerdmans, 2019.
- Becoming a Good Creature. Written by Sy Montgomery. HMH Books, 2020.
- Madame Saqui: Revolutionary Rope Dancer. Written by Lisa Robinson. Schwartz & Wade/Random, 2020.
- Kafka and the Doll. Written by Larissa Theule. Viking, 2021.
- A Bear Far from Home. Written by Susan Fletcher. Anne Schwartz/Random, 2022.
- Loujain Dreams of Sunflowers: A Story Inspired by Loujain Alhathloul. Written by Lina Alhathloul and Uma Mishra-Newbery. minedition, 2022.

=== As writer and illustrator ===
- How to Make Friends with a Ghost. Tundra Books, 2017.
