= Wajeha al-Huwaider =

Saudi activist and writer (born 1962)

Wajeha al-Huwaider وجيهة الحويدر
- Occupations: Journalist, writer

Wajeha al-Huwaider (Arabic: وجيهة الحويدر) (born 1962 or 1963) is a Saudi activist and writer, who played a key role in the anti male-guardianship and women to drive campaigns during the early twenty-first century. She is a co-founder of the Association for the Protection and Defense of Women's Rights in Saudi Arabia. As a result of her work, al-Huwaider has been the recipient of both significant legal prosecution in Saudi Arabia and international praise.

== Childhood and education ==
Al-Huwaider was raised in al-Ahsa in Eastern Saudi Arabia. She obtained a Master of Arts degree in Reading Management from George Washington University.

== Writing and activism ==
Al-Huwaider spent several years writing for the local press, including the Arabic Language daily Al-Watan and the English-language daily Arab News. Over the course of her tenure, she covered progressive policy topics like strengthening women's rights and improving the treatment of Saudi Arabia's Shia Muslim minority.

Following her written declaration that Saudi citizens were increasingly turning to the US for policy solutions because of a growing disillusion with the Saudi state, the government banned her from domestic publishing in 2003. Following this, Al-Huwaider began to work for a number of pro free-speech Pan-Arab media sites where she became internationally renowned for writing about women's rights.

Together with activist Fawzia al-Oyouni, Wajeha Al-Huwaider created the website "Saudi Women Voice" in 2007 to provide information and statistics regarding the plight of women in Saudi Arabia and active campaigns to combat their oppression. However, the domain was shut down in 2015.

On 6 August 2006, al-Huwaider was arrested after she publicly protested by holding a sign stating "Give women their rights". She was detained again on 20 September 2006 for six hours. Before she was released, al-Huwaider was forced to sign a statement agreeing to cease all human rights activism and banned from travelling outside Saudi Arabia. The travel ban was lifted on 28 September.

Al-Huwaider supported the appointment of Norah al-Faiz and added that the Saudi government needs to further the rights of women. Al-Huwaider wrote "Saudi women are weak, no matter how high their status, even the 'pampered' ones among them, because they have no law to protect them from attack by anyone. The oppression of women and the effacement of their selfhood is a flaw affecting most homes in Saudi Arabia." In 2007, she presented a petition to King Abdullah advocating an end to the ban on women drivers. She collected signatures for the petition in public areas and through the internet, despite intimidation and the frequent blocking of her e-mail address. The year after, she received international media attention when a video of her driving in Saudi Arabia was posted on YouTube; it was illegal for women to drive in Saudi Arabia at the time. Al-Huwaider also campaigned against the mahram or guardianship laws that give male kin control over women's daily lives, including permission to travel outside the home. In the video she posted of herself driving in a rural area, she requested the universal right for women to drive. She stated, "I wish Prince Naif, Minister of Interior affairs, gives us the right to drive."

In 2009 she deliberately tried on three separate occasions to cross the border with Bahrain without male guardian approval. She was refused departure all three times. She encouraged other women to try the same experiment in protest against the male guardianship system in general.

A brief period spent in the United States influenced her to become a feminist activist:

"Before that, I knew that I'm a human being. However, in the United States I felt it, because I was treated as one. I learned life means nothing without freedom. Then I decided to become a real women's rights activist, in order to free women in my country and to make them feel alive."

In 2011 al-Huwaider and Fawzia al-Oyouni were charged with kidnapping for attempting to help Nathalie Morin to escape her abusive husband and go to the Canadian embassy in Riyadh. The charges were dropped due to the influence of a prominent politician in the region, but a year later al-Huwaider and Fawzia al-Oyouni were charged with the lesser crime of takhbib (inciting a separation between a husband and wife). On 15 June 2013 al-Huwaider and al-Oyouni were convicted and sentenced to prison for ten months, with an additional two-year travel ban.

In 2017, Wajeha Al-Huwaider received renewed international attention when King Salman of Saudi Arabia officially announced a lifting of the driving ban on women. In a conversation with Canadian press, the activist expressed her joy at the decision while applauding the general direction in which the country was headed.

== Accolades and recognition ==
The editor of the reform-minded Aafaq compared al-Huwaidar to Rosa Parks.

In 2004, Wajeha Al-Huwaider received the "Oxfam Novib/PEN Free Expression award" in Hague, presented to journalists in the international community who have faced prosecution for their work.

As a result of her campaign work, Al-Huwaider was featured in CSPAN's annual "Women in the World Summit" in 2011 to discuss the gender disparities present in Saudi Arabia.

== See also ==
- Manal al-Sharif
- 2018–2019 Saudi crackdown on feminists
