= Nathalie Morin =

Canadian citizen

- Occupation: housewife
- Known for: victim of domestic violence
- Website: nathaliemorin.org

Nathalie Morin is a Canadian citizen, born in Quebec, who has been living in Saudi Arabia with her partner, Saeed Al Shahrani since 2005. She claims that she is physically and psychologically mistreated with her four children. She has stated that she "does not have any friend[s]" in Saudi Arabia and is shunned because of her foreign roots. She refuses to leave Saudi Arabia as her husband has custody of their children.

In 2012, the Canadian and Saudi Arabian governments came reportedly close to a deal, but a solution did not materialise. A Saudi Arabian writer and political activist, Wajeha al-Huwaider, also tried to help her, but without any success so far.

Despite the launch of an anti-domestic violence campaign in Saudi Arabia in 2013, brutally oppressive patriarchal laws allowed Morin to leave the kingdom, but without her children. Two prominent Saudi activists Wajeha Al-Huwaider and Fawzia Al-Oyouni came in support of Morin, but were arrested. Morin's wish to testify in front of her activists was also not granted by the Saudi authorities. As per Morin's mother, three of the four children were born in Saudi Arabia forcefully. She also said Morin is cut off from the world, locked in an apartment in Dammam, victim of physical, psychological and sexual violence from her spouse.
