= Madrakah =

- Village
- Location in Saudi Arabia
- Coordinates: 21°58′47″N 39°59′15″E
- Country: Saudi Arabia
- Province: Makkah Province
- Time zone: UTC+3 (EAT)
  - Summer (DST): UTC+3 (EAT)

Madrakah is a village in Makkah Province, in western Saudi Arabia. It is noted as being the first Saudi municipality to elect a woman, Salma bint Hizab al-Oteibi, to its respective Municipal council.

== See also ==
- List of cities and towns in Saudi Arabia
- Regions of Saudi Arabia
