= Wali (Islamic legal guardian) =

Guardian of women and girls in Islam

Countries where women are legally under male guardianship

Walī (Arabic: ولي, plural ʾawliyāʾ أولياء) is an Arabic word primarily meaning "ally", from which other related meanings with Islamic cultural tones derive, such as "friend of God" or "holy man", etc. "Wali" can also mean a "legal guardian", or ruler; someone who has "Wilayah" (authority or guardianship) over somebody else, and in fiqh (Islamic jurisprudence) is often "an authorized agent of the bride in concluding a marriage contract (Islamic Law)".

Traditionally, girls and women in Saudi Arabia have been forbidden by law from travelling, obtaining a passport, conducting official business, obtaining employment, concluding a marriage contract, or undergoing certain medical procedures without permission from their guardian, who must be an adult Muslim male. In 2019, however, some of these restrictions on adult women in Saudi Arabia were lifted from traveling, undergoing certain medical procedures, obtaining passports, and employment.

In the Islamic Republic of Iran, the Supreme Leader of the government is a wali al-faqih (guardian jurist), under the principle advanced by the Ayatollah Ruhollah Khomeini that "in the absence of an infallible Imam", Islam gives a just and capable Islamic jurist "universal" or "absolute" authority over all people, including adult males.

== Scriptural basis ==
At least according to the traditional interpretation of the Saudi religious establishment, the concept of guardianship of women is drawn from the Quran,which states, "Men are the protectors and maintainers of women, because God has given the one more [strength] than the other, and because they support them from their means."^{[Quran 4:34]}

== Wali as agent of the bride ==
Most Muslim scholars have held that in order for the nikah (marriage) of an adult woman to be valid, there must be consent not only of the bride and groom but also of the bride's wali mujbir, her male guardian. This view is held by most Muslim scholars and schools of fiqh, but the Hanafi school holds that the wali's permission is not necessary for the Nikah.

The wali is typically the father or, failing that, another male relative, and failing that a qadi (Islamic judge). This order of succession of who may serve as a wali is often spelled out by jurists, such as in this list written by Ibn Abd al-Wahhab: if the father is otherwise unavailable guardianship should be assigned

first to the woman's brother, then to the paternal grandfather than to the woman's son.... [then it] passes to the tribe of the brother, unless it is low/base/despicable, ... [then the] paternal uncle takes over, followed by his son, then other relatives in paternal relationships. ... Maternal relative only have a claim to marriage guardianship if there are not paternal relatives. ... the sultan or political leader may serve as the marriage guardian ... only if he is a just man .... Thus the critical factor in selecting an alternative marriage guardian is the man's adherence to justice, not his political position.

=== Types ===
The Hanafi school of Islamic law is unique among Sunni madhhab (school of jurisprudence) in recognizing the validity of a marriage where the woman acts on her own behalf and is not represented by a male wali.

At least in the Hanafi school of fiqh, there is a distinction between a Wali ijbar and a wali ikhtiyar. A wali ikhtiyar does "not have the authority to force", and cannot arrange a marriage without the bride's permission. The marriage requires "a verbal answer" from the potential bride to go ahead.

According to the founder of the Maliki school of fiqh, Malik ibn Anas, there are two kinds of custody or guardianship – khassa (specific) and `amma (general). Specific guardianship belongs to the patriarchal lineage – father, grandfather, etc. (explained above). General guardianship "was connected completely with Islam, and every Muslim male". An example of `amma guardianship is where a Muslim man arranges a marriage for a woman who does "not have a father, or other male family members".

The founder of the Hanbali school, Ahmad ibn Hanbal, believed that the wali ijbar was the right of the father or, if there was no father of a judge (similar to Malik's position), with other imams that the role of a wali ikhtiyar "could be taken by all kinds of wali", not necessarily a relative on the father's side of the family.

=== Before marriage ===
Before a woman is married, a mahram, (close male relative, usually brother or father) should be present whenever the woman meets with someone of the opposite sex and for other issues. (This at least is the opinion of many conservative Muslims such as Ustadha Nasari, who points to Quranic verse Al-Tauba, 9:71 where "awliya", (plural of wali) is translated as "protector".

== Husbands as "guardians" of wives ==
While a husband or a mahram cannot be a wali, of their wife, they do have "protector" status over them, and are sometimes referred to as "guardians" of their wives and families in English language sources.

According to Human Rights Watch, as of mid-2023, some Muslim countries do not allow women to "leave their homes without permission from their husband or other guardian without facing possible sanction" -- namely, Iran, Iraq, Kuwait, Bahrain, Qatar, UAE, Oman, Yemen, Saudi Arabia, Egypt, Palestine, Lebanon, Jordan, and Syria.

=== Yemen ===
In Yemen, as of 2005, women are not legally permitted a passport without the approval of their wali, but are allowed to travel without permission once they have a passport. However, law enforcement often disregard this freedom and "restrict a woman's right to travel if her guardian disapproves and reports her to the authorities." In 2013, according to Rothna Begum, of Human Rights Watch, women could not leave their house without her husband's permission, with a few emergency exceptions, such as taking care of ailing parents.

=== Saudi Arabia ===
Human Rights Watch (HRW) documented the Saudi implementation of the wali, mahram and mu'arif system in 2016. HRW stated that "in Saudi Arabia, a woman's life is controlled by a man from birth until death. Every Saudi woman must have a male guardian, normally a father or husband, but in some cases a brother or even a son, who has the power to make a range of critical decisions on her behalf." So that women could "not apply for a passport without male guardian approval and require permission to travel outside the country."

In the 2010s, Saudi women organised an anti male-guardianship campaign. Changes were gradually made so that by 2016 women were allowed "to secure their own ID cards" and divorced and widowed women are allowed family cards, and the requirement "that a woman bring a male relative to identify them in court" has been removed. In 2019, women were granted "the right to travel without a male relative’s permission, to receive equal treatment in the workplace and to obtain family documents from the government", but still lacked the right "to marry or live on their own" without a male wali's permission, until 2021 where Saudi women gained the right to live independently without permission from a male guardian. This came as a development of an earlier ruling that affirmed the legality of the independence of an adult woman in a separate house.

== Wali as guardian of children and incapacitated adults ==
=== Nigeria ===
Some definitions of Guardian in Sunni Islam at least in Islamic Nigeria:

- For Children: "The main role of a legal guardian under the Shari’a is to act in the child’s best interests when the child’s parents cannot do so. Legal guardians are usually relatives such as an aunt, uncle, or grandparent. This may be due to death, incapacitation, or incarceration for a crime."
- Incapacitated adults: "In some situations, adults with severe handicaps may need a legal guardian to care for them and act on their behalf. This is known as an adult guardianship."

=== Hedaya ===
Another source (Sohaira Siddiqui) states that Hedaya (a 12th-century legal manual of Hanafi fiqh by Burhan al-Din al-Marghinan), "states that there are three forms of guardianship:

1. Guardianship for contracting marriage;
2. Guardianship of minor persons for custody and education; and
3. Guardianship of the property of minors.

== Guardianship of the Islamic Jurist ==
In Shia Islam, Islamic Jurists (faqīh, pl. fuqahā') often take on the duty of wali. Guardianship of the Islamic Jurist, (Persian: ولایت فقیه, Vilayat-e Faqih; Arabic: ولاية الفقيه, Wilayat al-Faqih), is a doctrine in Twelver Shi'i Islam asserting that Islam gives Islamic jurists custodianship over people, "in the absence of an infallible Imam", (i.e. after the 12th Imam had gone into Occultation in 874 CE). Prior to the Iranian Revolution this referred to guardianship of non-litigious matters (al-omour al-hesbiah) including religious endowments (Waqf), judicial matters, those deemed incapable of looking after their own interests — minors, widows, and the insane", and property for which no specific person is responsible.

=== Islamic Republic of Iran ===
With the establishment of the Islamic Republic of Iran which institutionalized the teachings of the republic's founder Ayatollah Ruhollah Khomeini, most references to Guardianship of the Islamic Jurist referred to Wilayat al-amma or Wilayat al-Mutlaqa ("universal" or "absolute" authority), the idea that a faqīh should have guardianship over all issues for which Prophet of Islam and Shi'a Imam have responsibility, including how people are governed. This idea of guardianship forms the basis of the Constitution of the Islamic Republic of Iran which calls for a Vali-ye faqih ("Guardian Jurist" -- using Persian Vali-ye faqih instead of Arabic wali al-faqih), to serve as the Supreme Leader of the government. In the context of Iran, (the only country where this theory is being practiced), Guardianship of the Islamic Jurist is often referred to as "rule by the jurisprudent", "rule of the Islamic jurist", or "Governance of the Jurist".

== See also ==
- Coverture
- Legal guardian
- Paternalism
- Wali
