= 2005 Saudi Arabian municipal elections =

- 10 February-21 April 2005

178 municipalities

Municipal elections for 178 municipalities were held in Saudi Arabia between 10 February and 21 April 2005. The first to be held in the country since the 1960s, the elections were held in three stages: the first on 10 February around the capital city of Riyadh, the second in the east and southwest on 3 March, and the third, in the north, on 21 April.

Male citizens over the age of 21 voted for half of the members of their municipal councils. On 11 October 2004, Prince Nayef bin Abd al-Aziz, the Saudi Interior Minister, announced to a Kuwaiti newspaper that women would not be able to run as candidates or vote in the elections: "I do not think that women's participation is possible." Elections officials noted logistical concerns, such as the lack of separate women's voting booths and the fact that many women do not have identification cards, as well as opposition from conservative religious traditionalists. Saudi women's rights campaigner Hatoon al-Fassi felt that authorities giving a practical reason for non-participation of women rather than a religious reason constituted a success for women's campaigning, since arguing against practical objections is easier than arguing against religious objections. Prince Mansour bin Turki bin Abdulaziz Al-Saud expressed the hope that women would be able to vote in the 2009 elections. In March 2011, the delayed elections were announced for 23 April 2011.

== Election results of Riyadh region ==
On 10 February 2005, the first round of the elections was realized in the Riyadh region and Islamists won the majority, taking all the seven available seats. A total of 646 candidates were on the list. Those who were not chosen accused the Saudi religious establishment for using the backing of to get votes, and breaking election laws for campaigning on the election day. The winners, on the other hand, denied all these allegations. In the election campaigns, those who used ads in newspapers, posters or other ways to meet the potential voters that are much more traditional election strategies did not win in the election, while those who did not employ any of these strategies won in the election. However, the winners employed much more advanced strategies such as internet and mobile phones that is regarded as a tactic frequently preferred by Islamist groupings in the region to expand their ideas.

== Election results in other cities ==
In Jeddah, the most liberal Saudi city, all the seven winning candidates were those supported by the prominent conservative religious scholars among 530 candidates. Five of the six winners in Buraydah, the capital of the very conservative Qaseem province, also gained a similar clerical support. Islamists won all the seats in the holy cities of Mecca and Medina as well. In the eastern regions, several non-Islamist candidates were elected on 3 March 2005. Shiites swept the board in the town of Qatif and won five out of six seats in al-Hasa. However, in the urban centres of the eastern regions such as Dammam, Dhahran and Al Khobar that are inhabited by considerable Shi’ite population Sunni candidates won the seats with the help of the support they secured from fundamentalist clerics.
