= Dhahban Central Prison =

Maximum security facility in Saudi Arabia

- Location within Saudi Arabia
- Location: Dahaban, Saudi Arabia; 21°51′09″N 39°07′57″E
- Status: Active
- Capacity: 7,500
- Population: 3,000+ (2015)
- Opened: 2015
- Director: Mani Al-Otaibi

Dhahban Central Prison (Arabic: سجن المباحث العامة بذهبان), also known as Dhahban Prison, is a maximum-security prison facility located near Dahaban, Jeddah, in Saudi Arabia. It was built in 2015 as part of a renovation of the Jeddah Prisons infrastructure, at a cost of SR400 million. It has a capacity of 7,500 inmates. When it opened, 3,000 inmates were transferred there from Braiman Prison. In, Mani Al-Otaibi, said it was the most advanced prison in Saudi Arabia, with state-of-the-artin Saudi Arabia, with state of the art surveillance technologies.

The facility is used to hold high-profile political prisoners, as well as members of al-Qaeda and the Islamic State. It holds male and female prisoners, as well as some small children of female prisoners. It has been alleged that the female inmates have been tortured. Detained female activists were electrocuted and flogged repeatedly, according to Amnesty International, and Human Rights Watch. An anonymous Saudi official denied that torture was condoned by the state. Saudi Arabia claims that inmates get "top treatment".

The Badawi siblings are currently being held in this prison; with the Government of Canada demanding their release, the Saudi Arabian Government expelled the Ambassador of Canada to Saudi Arabia and recalled the Ambassador of Saudi Arabia to Canada, along with diplomatic staff and Saudi Arabian students in Canada. Some of whom have sought asylum as a result of this.

== Allegations of torture ==
Several Saudi Arabian activists are reported to have been detained without charge in Dhahban Prison since May 2018. The activists have been repeatedly tortured by electrocution and flogging, leaving many of them unable to walk or stand properly. According to the three testimonies obtained by Amnesty International, one of the activists was forced to hang from the ceiling. Another woman was subjected to repeated sexual harassment by interrogators, who wore masks over their faces. Despite the evidence presented by Human Rights Watch and Amnesty International, Saudi Arabia’s media ministry has denied all such allegations.

On 28 November 2018, another woman was allegedly tortured inside the prison, according to a report released by Human Rights Watch. As per the report, Saudi authorities tortured the activist with electric shocks and tied her down to a steel bed and whipped her, while also being sexually harassed.

== Notable inmates ==
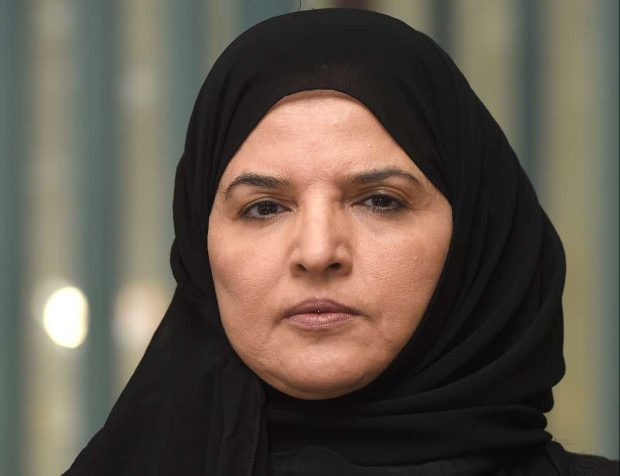
Aziza al-Yousef

In November 2018, prominent inmates detained in Dhahban Central Prison included:

- Waleed Abulkhair
- Raif Badawi
- Samar Badawi
- Nassima al-Sadah
- Loujain al-Hathloul (In al-Ha'ir Prison by February 2019)
- Iman al-Nafjan
- Aziza al-Yousef

== See also ==
- Al-Ha'ir Prison
- ʽUlaysha Prison
