= Aisha al-Mana =

Saudi activist and feminist

- Born: Saudi Arabia
- Occupations: women's rights activist, educator

Aisha al-Mana (Arabic: عائشة المانع) is a Saudi activist and feminist who has participated both in demonstrations against the ban on women driving in Saudi Arabia and in the anti male-guardianship campaign. She also works as director of the Al-Mana General Hospitals and the Mohammad al-Mana College of Health Sciences, and is a board member of Ebrahim M. Almana and Brothers.

== Biography ==
Al-Mana was born in 1948 in the Saudi city of Khobar. After studying the Quran at Al-Kutab in Saudi Arabia, Al-Mana traveled to Egypt, where she finished school. She then studied sociology at the American University of Beirut, and obtained a bachelor's degree in sociology from the University of Oregon in 1971, followed by a master's degree in sociology from Arizona State University. She obtained her PhD from the University of Colorado Boulder in 1982, becoming one of the first Saudi women to do so, alongside the likes of Soraya Al-Turki, Soraya Obeid, Fatin Shakir and Samira Islam. Her dissertation title was Economic Development and its Impact on the Status of Women in Saudi Arabia.

In 1985, al-Mana established Al-Sharika Al-Khalijiah Lil Inmaa (Al-Khalijiah Development Company,) the first company in Saudi Arabia run completely by women. The company's mission was to offer computer training and technical education to women and to establish a research center with a focus on research on women in the workforce.

Al-Mana became the first female hospital director in Saudi Arabia in 1990, when she became Director of Support Services at the Almana Group of Hospitals in the Eastern Province of Saudi Arabia.

== Challenging the driving ban ==
Al-Mana participated in three different campaigns to protest the driving ban on women. The first was in 1990, during the Gulf War, and was documented in the 2011 book The Sixth of November. Al-Mana also participated in subsequent campaigns in 2011 and 2013 as part of the Women to Drive movement.

Aisha al-Mana was one of forty-six women to organize a demonstration in Riyadh on 6 November 1990 to protest the Kingdom's ban on women driving. Prior to the demonstration, the women had sent a petition to then-Prince Salman bin Abdulaziz, the governor of Riyadh at the time, requesting that he and King Fahad move to lift the ban. They drove their cars in a convoy until they were stopped and detained by the police. Al-Mana and several other participants described their experiences in the book, The Sixth of November. The demonstration was also fictionalized by Saad Al-Dosari in his novel, Riyadh- November 90. Most of the participants received travel bans, and those who had government jobs lost their positions.

Years later, al-Mana also participated in two other driving campaigns. The first, inspired by the Arab Spring, took place in 2011, while the other was organized in October 2013.

== Gender equality activism and educational work ==
In 2011, al-Mana held workshops on the male guardianship system in the cities of Riyadh, Jeddah and Khobar as part of the anti male-guardianship campaign.

In 2013, she participated in a symposium titled Women, Commercial Inheritance and Family Rule during which participants called for "an independent body of a judicial nature" to protect women's inheritance. Saudi women are often pressured by family members, relatives, acquaintances and other members of society to give up any funds they may be entitled to inherit so that the inheritance may be divided up among male next of kin. Al-Mana says that, "Denying women their inheritance is one of the main reasons behind family feuds."

Al-Mana has established foundations to support the education of Saudi women. The Aisha Almana Global Health Program is a scholarship program at the University of Oregon, where she obtained her bachelor's degree. The program "will provide scholarships for Saudi women to study global health at the University of Oregon, fund seed grants for faculty research, help implement an annual series of speakers and workshops, and support internships for University of Oregon students in the Saudi kingdom — the UO’s first fully funded international internships in global health." The Aisha Al Mana Endowment for Women in Nursing and the Health Sciences supports the education of women studying nursing and the health and medical sciences. Priority is given to Saudi women, but if there are no eligible Saudi women applicants, then women from other Arab countries are considered.

== Arrest ==
In May 2018 she was reported arrested, together with other female Saudi activists, Loujain al-Hathloul, Iman al-Nafjan, Aziza al-Yousef and Madeha al-Ajroush, and two male women's-rights activists, though Aisha Al-Mana and Madeha al-Ajroush were released after a few days.
