= Madeha al-Ajroush =

Saudi Arabian activist

- Born: Saudi Arabia
- Occupation(s): Psychotherapist, photographer, women's rights activist
- Website: madehaalajroush.com

Madeha al-Ajroush (Arabic: مديحة العجروش) is a Saudi Arabian women's rights activist, psychologist and photographer. She was detained by Saudi authorities in May 2018 along with Loujain al-Hathloul and five other activists.

== Women's rights activism ==
In 1990, al-Ajroush took part in the first protests by Saudi women against the ban on women driving. As a result of these actions, al-Ajroush was detained and lost her job and passport. With the first Gulf War taking place in neighbouring Kuwait, "Seeing female U.S. soldiers stationed in Saudi Arabia driving gave the women the push they needed to act". As an additional punishment for this action, photographic negatives created by al-Ajroush over 15 years were burned by Saudi authorities.

In 2013, al-Ajroush told The Telegraph, '"Back in 1990 I was absolutely terrified... And there was no social media to highlight what we were doing and protect us."'

Around 15–18 May 2018, she was detained by Saudi authorities, along with Loujain al-Hathloul, Iman al-Nafjan, Aziza al-Yousef, Aisha al-Mana and two men involved in women's rights campaigning. Human Rights Watch interpreted the purpose of the arrests as frightening "anyone expressing skepticism about the crown prince's rights agenda". Saudi authorities accused the arrested activists of having "suspicious contact with foreign parties", providing financial support to "hostile elements abroad" and recruiting government workers.

According to The Independent, the arrests came "just six weeks before Saudi Arabia is due to lift the world’s only ban on women driving."

Madeha al-Ajroush and Aisha al-Mana were released after a few days, while the others remained under arrest.
