= Eman al-Nafjan =

Saudi blogger and feminist activist

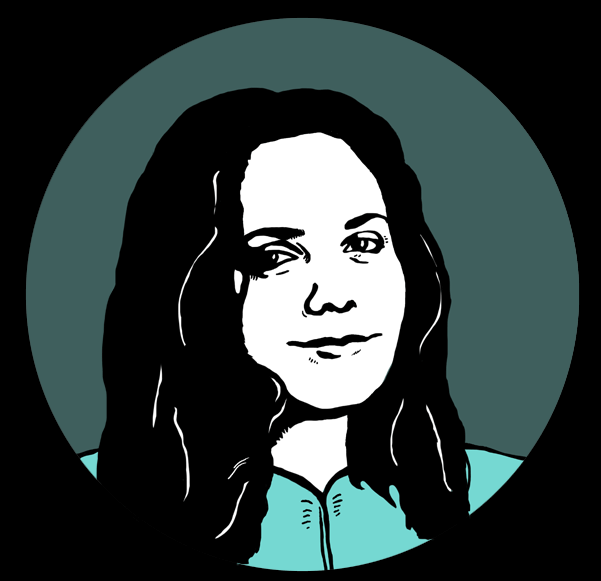
- Born: Saudi Arabia
- Education: University of Riyadh, University of Birmingham
- Occupations: writer, educator
- Children: 3
- Website: saudiwoman.wordpress.com

Eman al-Nafjan is a Saudi Arabian blogger and women's rights activist. She was detained by Saudi authorities in May 2018 along with Loujain al-Hathloul and five other women's rights activists in what Human Rights Watch interpreted as an attempt to frighten the activists, during the 2018–2019 Saudi crackdown on feminists.

On 14 March 2019, PEN America announced that Nouf Abdulaziz, Loujain Al-Hathloul, and Eman Al-Nafjan would receive the 2019 PEN America/Barbey Freedom to Write Award, which was presented on 21 May at the 2019 PEN America Literary Gala at the American Museum of Natural History in New York City.

In late March 2019, the women presented their defence and described physical and sexual abuse they had endured in captivity. Eman al-Nafjan, together with Aziza al-Yousef and Dr Rokaya Mohareb were released on bail.

In September 2019, al-Nafjan received "The Prize for Courage", awarded by Reporters Without Borders. She remained barred from travelling out of Saudi Arabia, and hence could not collect her award.

== Childhood and education ==
Al-Nafjan was born in Saudi Arabia, the daughter of a senior Saudi military officer. She earned a bachelor's degree in English at what at the time was the University of Riyadh (KSU). She worked as a school teacher and later a university teaching assistant. She earned a master's degree in Teaching English as a foreign language from the University of Birmingham in the United Kingdom.

Al-Nafjan taught pre-medical English at KSU. She encouraged students to discuss their opinions freely and write about them, which her student at the time, Omaima al-Najjar, described as "unheard of in Saudi schools, where we were not allowed to have an opinion or even question the teacher on any matter that involved religion, culture or politics". Al-Nafjan openly stated her strong opinions in favour of women's rights at the time. Al-Nafjan’s Reporters Without Borders award was received by her student Omaima al-Najjar on her behalf as Al-Nafjan was at prison at the time.

In 2013, al-Nafjan was conducting research aiming to obtain a PhD in linguistics at KSU.

== Blogging and activism ==
In February 2008, al-Nafjan began blogging as 'Saudiwoman', writing about Saudi social and cultural issues with a focus on women. Her blog became one of the most popular Saudi blogs read internationally. Al-Nafjan blogged about topics that were taboo in Saudi Arabia at the time, including criticising male-guardianship as an "abuse system", opposing child marriage and interventions by the religious police, and documenting internet surveillance by Saudi authorities.

On 17 June 2011, she drove a car in Riyadh as part of a women's driving campaign during the 2011 Saudi Arabian protests. She began publishing articles in Western media about the campaign to allow women to drive in Saudi Arabia. In October 2013, al-Nafjan was arrested while filming a woman driving. In September 2016, al-Nafjan signed a petition as part of the campaign against the Saudi male guardianship system. Al-Nafjan was highly active in supporting other activists in the women to drive campaign and in contributing to public debate on the issue.

== Detention ==
Around 15–18 May 2018, al-Nafjan was detained by Saudi authorities, along with Loujain al-Hathloul, Aziza al-Yousef, Aisha al-Mana, Madeha al-Ajroush and two men involved in women's rights campaigning. Human Rights Watch interpreted the purpose of the arrests as frightening "anyone expressing skepticism about the crown prince's rights agenda". Saudi authorities accused the arrested activists of having "suspicious contact with foreign parties", providing financial support to "hostile elements abroad" and recruiting government workers.

In November, 2018, she was apparently being held in the Dhahban Central Prison. According to Amnesty International, the detained women's rights activists including al-Nafjan were subjected to torture and abuse.

In March 2019, al-Nafjan was released on bail along with some of the other crackdown detainees.
