= Women to drive movement =

Pre-2018 campaign advocating for Saudi women's rights

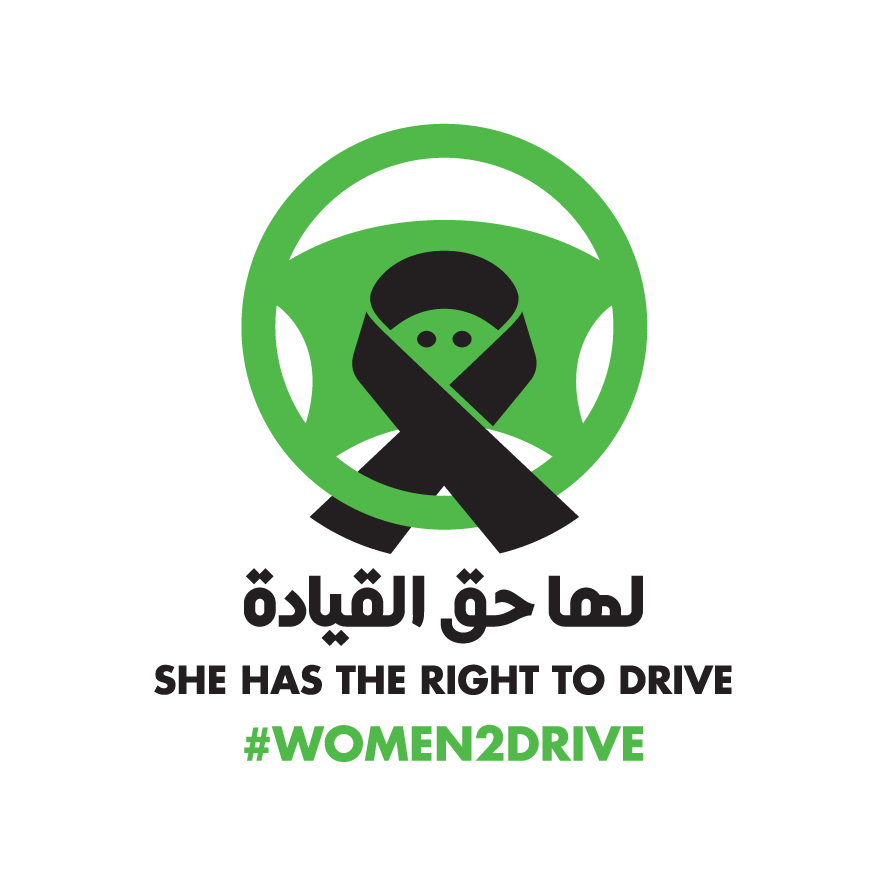
The logo of the Women to Drive Movement in Saudi Arabia

Until June 2018, Saudi Arabia was the only country in which women were forbidden by law from operating motor vehicles. This restriction gave rise to the Women to Drive Movement (Arabic: قيادة المرأة في السعودية Qiyādat al-Mar’at fī as-Sa‘ūdiyyah), which advocated for women to be able to obtain a driver's license and drive cars on public roads; Saudi women have historically been denied many rights that Saudi men are entitled to. In 1990, dozens of women in Riyadh who had expressed dissent by driving were arrested and had their passports confiscated. In 2007, Saudi activist Wajeha al-Huwaider, who has also been among the leading figures of the campaign against male guardianship, was among several women who petitioned King Abdullah for the right to drive, and a film of her driving on International Women's Day in 2008 attracted international media attention.

The beginning of the Arab Spring in 2011 motivated some Saudi women, including al-Huwaider and Manal al-Sharif, to organise a more intensive campaign for the right of women to drive, leading to about 70 cases of women driving being documented in the latter half of June that year. In late September 2011, a Saudi woman named Shaima Jastania was sentenced to ten lashes for the offense of driving in Jeddah, but the sentence was later overturned. Two years later, another campaign to defy the ban set 26 October 2013 as the date for women to start driving. Three days prior, in a "rare and explicit restating of the ban", a spokesman of the Interior Ministry warned that "women in Saudi [Arabia] are banned from driving and laws will be applied against violators and those who demonstrate support." Interior Ministry employees warned leaders of the campaign individually to not partake in the 26 October driving demonstration, and police roadblocks were assembled in Riyadh to check for any female drivers.

On 26 September 2017, King Salman issued an order to allow women to drive, with new guidelines to be created and implemented by June 2018. Women to Drive campaigners were ordered not to contact media, and several were detained in May 2018, including Loujain al-Hathloul, Eman al-Nafjan, Aisha Al-Mana, Aziza al-Yousef and Madeha al-Ajroush. The ban was officially lifted on 24 June 2018, although many of the women's rights activists remained under arrest. As of 23 August 2018, twelve remained in detention.

== Background ==
According to scholar David Commins, "In 1957, Riyadh pronounced a ban on women driving." As of 2012, women's rights in Saudi Arabia were highly constrained in comparison to international standards. This included their right to drive cars and other motor vehicles. In 2002, The Economist magazine estimated that the salaries of the approximately 500,000 chauffeurs driving women in Saudi Arabia accounted for 1% of the national income.

== History ==
=== 1990 driving protest ===
On 6 November 1990, 47 Saudi women in Riyadh drove their cars in protest against the driving ban. They were imprisoned for one day, had their passports confiscated, and some of them lost their jobs as a result of their activism. Religious officials called for their beheading, but they were ultimately released. The women were doxxed; their personal information, including addresses and phone numbers were made public, and death threats were made to their families.

=== 2007–2008 petition and YouTube video ===
In September 2007, the Association for the Protection and Defense of Women's Rights in Saudi Arabia, co-founded by Wajeha al-Huwaider and Fawzia al-Uyyouni, submitted a 1,100-signature petition to King Abdullah asking for women to be allowed to drive.

On International Women's Day 2008, al-Huwaider filmed herself driving, for which she received international media attention after the video was posted on YouTube. Al-Huwaider's drive began within a residential compound, where women are permitted to drive since roadways inside the compound are not considered to be public roads, but she left the compound and drove along a main highway. Al-Huwaider expressed the hope that the ban on women driving would be lifted by International Women's Day in 2009.

In June–July 2007, a Gallup poll found that the majority of Saudi men and women thought that women should be allowed to drive.

=== 2011–2014 campaign ===
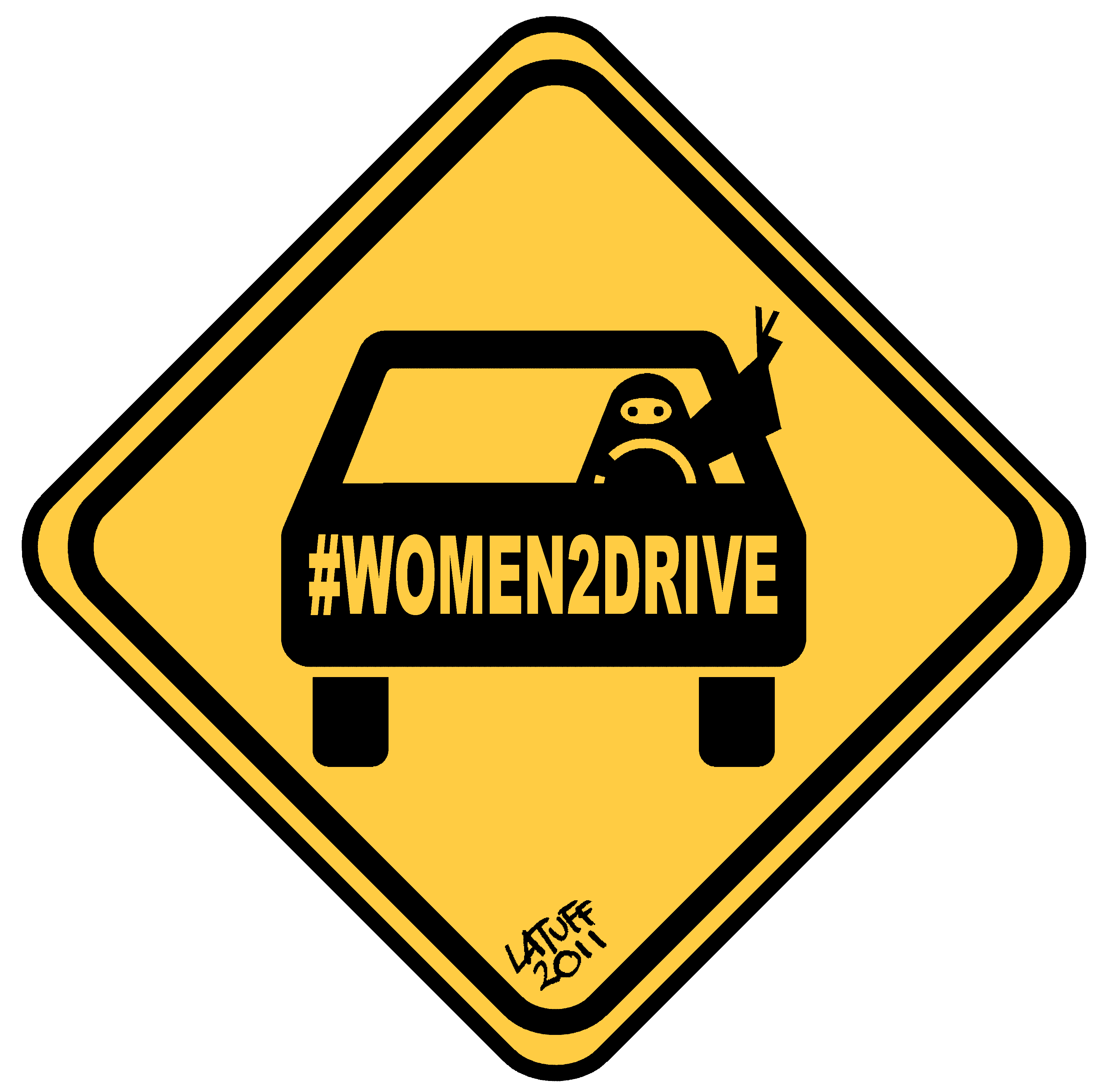
Poster for the Saudi Arabia's #women2drive Movement, artwork by Carlos Latuff

In 2011, a group of women including Manal al-Sharif started a Facebook campaign named "Teach me how to drive so I can protect myself" or Women2Drive that says that women should be allowed to drive. The women said that their campaign was inspired by the Arab Spring.

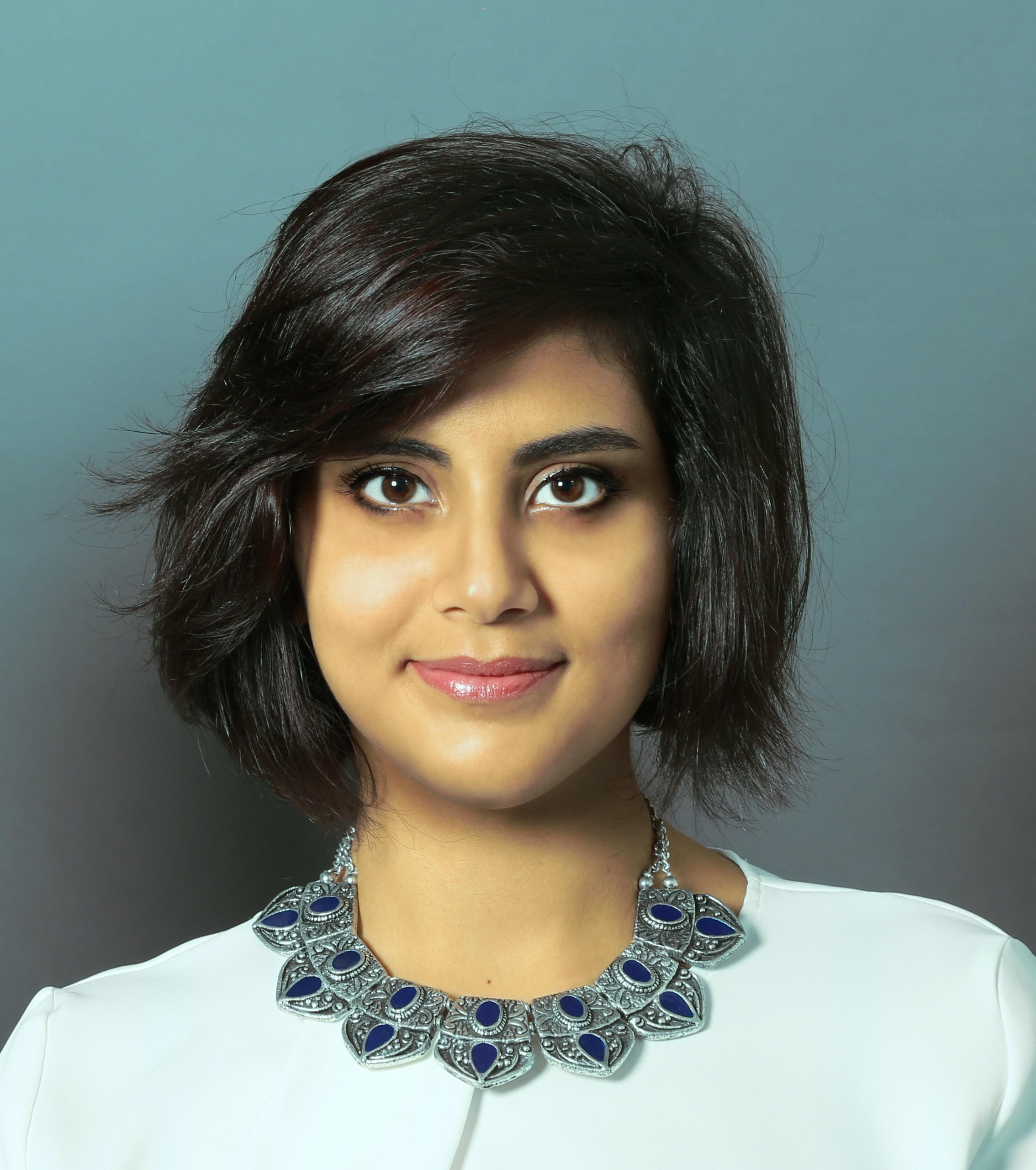
Loujain al-Hathloul was arrested for driving a car, as she was at the UAE-Saudi border.

The campaign called for women to start driving from 17 June 2011. As of 21 May 2011, about 12,000 readers of the Facebook page had expressed their support. Al-Sharif described the action as acting within women's rights, and "not protesting". Wajeha al-Huwaider was impressed by the campaign and decided to help.

A woman from Jeddah, Najla Hariri, started driving in the second week of May 2011, stating "Before in Saudi, you never heard about protests. [But] after what has happened in the Middle East, we started to accept a group of people going outside and saying what they want in a loud voice, and this has had an impact on me."

==== Subaru ====
In mid-2011, as Subaru vehicles tend to be marketed heavily towards women (in the US), several Saudi women groups including Saudi Women for Driving asked the parent company of Subaru, Fuji Heavy Industries, to stop selling motor vehicles in countries where women cannot drive.

==== Manal al-Sharif ====
External videos
- Q&A interview with al-Sharif on her book Daring to Drive: A Saudi Woman's Awakening, July 16, 2017, C-SPAN

The following week, al-Huwaider filmed al-Sharif driving a car as part of the campaign. The video was posted on YouTube and Facebook. Al-Sharif was detained and released on 21 May and rearrested the following day. On 30 May, al-Sharif was released on bail, on the conditions of returning for questioning if requested, not driving and not talking to the media. The New York Times and Associated Press associated the women's driving campaign with the wider pattern of the Arab Spring and the long duration of al-Sharif's detention with Saudi authorities' fear of protests.

==== Late May – early June ====
On 23 May, another woman was detained for driving a car. She drove with two women passengers in Ar Rass and was detained by traffic police in the presence of the Committee for the Promotion of Virtue and Prevention of Vice (CPVPV). She was released after signing a statement that she would not drive again. In reaction to al-Sharif's arrest, several more Saudi women published videos of themselves driving during the following days.

Wajnat Rahbini, a Saudi actress famous in the Arab world for playing in the satirical comedy Tash ma Tash, broadcast annually during Ramadan, drove her car "in defiance of a long-standing ban on female driving" on 4 June in Jeddah. She was detained after exiting her car and released the following day without bail.

==== 17 June 2011 ====
On 17 June, about 30 to 50 women drove cars in towns in Saudi Arabia, including Maha al-Qahtani and Eman Nafjan in Riyadh, and other women in Jeddah and Dammam. When she drove for a second time the same day, al-Qahtani was given a ticket for driving without a Saudi Arabian licence. Al-Qahtani was pleased to receive the ticket, stating to a Time magazine journalist travelling with her, "It's a ticket. Write this down. I am the first Saudi woman to get a traffic ticket."

The Guardian stated that "police appeared to be under orders not to intervene" during women's drives on 17 June.

==== Late June 2011 ====
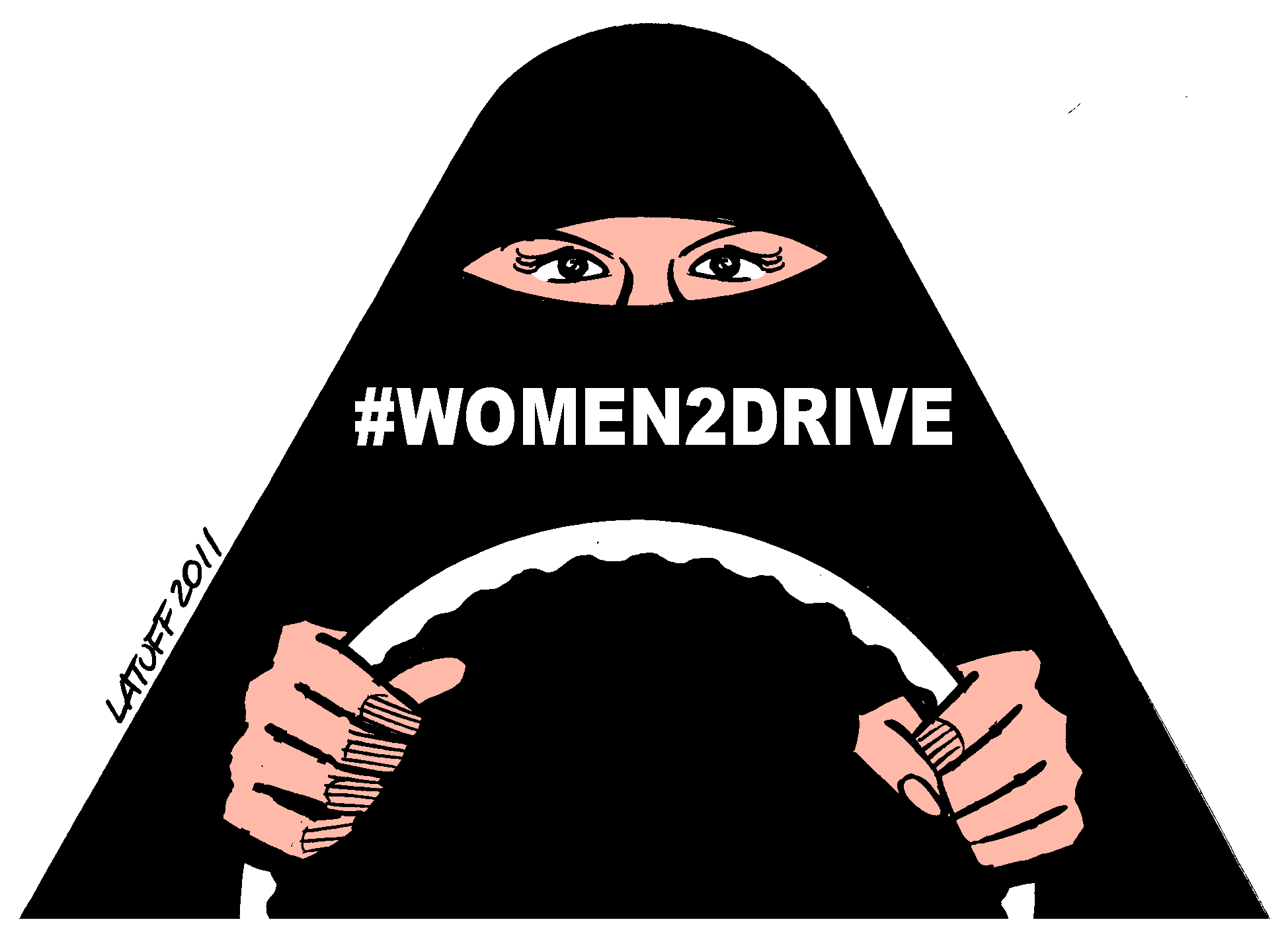
Cartoon for Saudi Arabia's Women to drive Movement by Carlos Latuff

Two Saudi women were photographed by Thomson Reuters after driving in Riyadh on 22 June.

On 29 June, five women driving in Jeddah were arrested. The Saudi Arabian blogger Eman al-Nafjan described the arrests as "the first big pushback from authorities". She claimed that the June drives were more significant than the 1990 protest, stating, "When actually the 1990 protest was only fourteen cars that had 47 passengers, [from] June 17th and onwards there have been about seventy documented cases of women driving."

==== July–September ====
In July, Princess al-Taweel, niece-in-law of Abdullah of Saudi Arabia, spoke about her opposition to the women driving ban on the United States (US) radio station NPR and called for women to have equal rights in the workforce, in the legal system, and in education. She described these human rights as more important than the right to drive. In response to criticisms of women's rights campaigns, she described her approach as "evolution not revolution".

At the end of September, Shaima Jastania was sentenced to 10 lashes for having driven a car in Jeddah. The sentence was announced shortly after King Abdullah decreed that women would be able to participate in the 2015 Saudi Arabian municipal elections and be appointed to the Consultative Assembly; King Abdullah overturned the sentence.

==== November ====
On 15 November 2011, Manal al-Sharif filed charges in the Grievances Board, a non-Sharia specialized court, against the General Directorate of Traffic for the rejection of her application for a driver's licence. Al-Sharif had applied for a licence in May 2011. The lawsuit was transferred to the Ministry of Interior.

==== December ====
In early December, a member of the Consultative Assembly, Kamal Subhi, submitted a report to the Assembly saying that lifting the ban would cause prostitution, pornography, homosexuality and divorce and the "end of virginity". The head of the Assembly told women campaigners that he was "still open to hearing the case for lifting the ban".

==== February 2012 ====
On 4 February, Samar Badawi, a human rights activist who had driven regularly since June 2011 and helped other women drivers with police and court procedures, filed similar charges to those of Manal al-Sharif, objecting to the rejection of her own driving licence application. Badawi was asked by the Grievances Board to "follow-up in a week". The women to drive campaign circulated an email about the court case.

==== June 2012 ====
On 29 June 2012, to celebrate the anniversary of the June 2011 driving campaign launch, a member of the My Right to Dignity women's rights campaign drove her car in Riyadh. She stated that she had driven about 30–40 times in 2011 and that about 100 Saudi women had driven regularly since June 2011.

==== October 2013 ====
In October 2013, there was a campaign calling for women to defy the ban in a protest drive on 26 October, which gained support from some prominent women activists. In response, the campaign's website (www.oct26driving.org) was blocked within Saudi Arabia and Sheikh Saleh al-Lohaidan, one of Saudi Arabia's top clerics, said women who drive risk damaging their ovaries and bearing children with clinical problems. Interior ministry employees had also contacted leaders of the campaign individually to tell them not to drive. However, despite this discouragement and a heavy police presence, as of Sunday 27 October Saudi activists had posted 12 films on YouTube said to be of women driving on Saturday, and said some other women had also driven but without recording their exploits on video or in photographs. Also a YouTube film made by Hisham Alfageeh and other male Saudi comedians went viral on Saturday to support the women's driving campaign, parodying the Bob Marley song "No Woman No Cry" as "No Woman No Drive".

Loujain Al-Hathloul

On 30 November 2014, Loujain Al-Hathloul made her move toward the Women to drive Movement in Saudi Arabia. As known, Saudi women are not able to have a driver's license, but Al-Hathloul previously obtained a driver's license from the United Arab Emirates. She filmed her experience of driving from the United Arab of Emirates with the intention of crossing the border back to Saudi Arabia. As a part of the support of the issue of the Saudi ban on women drivers. Al-Hathloul filmed herself driving on 26 October 2014. Her videos had over 800,000 views, a hashtag on Twitter, and also over 3,000 comments on YouTube. The public opinion with Al-Hathloul's case was divided to two groups, one group was supportive to what Loujain did, and the other one was not. Al-Hathloul tweeted her followers about her journey from the beginning. When she arrived at the border of Saudi Arabia she tweeted that she was stopped by a Saudi customs officer at the border. Al-Hathloul tweeted to her followers to keep them up with her and said: "Twenty-four hours spent on the border of Saudi." She also tweeted: "They won't give me back my passport and they won't let me pass through and no word from the Ministry of Interior. Complete silence from all the officials." Loujain Al-Hathloul was arrested after she filmed her attempt to defy the ban of driving for Saudis Women. She was arrested for 73 days.

In May 2018, al-Hathloul was detained again for attempting to "destabilize the Kingdom.” A subsequent petition was created to demand for her release. The hashtag, #Al-HathloulStrike, was circulated on social media platforms to spread awareness. Eventually, on February 10, 2021, it was announced on Twitter by al-Hathloul’s sister that she had been released from prison. Later, another tweet was posted about the restrictions, including a 5-year travel ban, al-Hathloul still faced.

Prince Mohammed bin Salman

Prince Mohammed bin Salman talked about the Ban of Saudi Women Driving in an interview and he said that "Saudi Arabia is not ready for women drivers". The prince Mohammed also said that "Women driving is not a religious issue as much as it is an issue that relates to the community itself that either accepts it or refuses it." However, he was later seen as the figure behind the removal of the driving ban in September 2017.

=== Lifting of ban 2017–2018 ===
On 26 September 2017, King Salman issued a statement recognizing the right of Saudi women to drive in keeping with Sharia. Soon afterward, Al-Sharif commented on the M/85 addendum by tweeting, '#Women2Drive done #IAmMyOwnGuardian in progress.' Even as celebrations by activists ensued, they were already preparing to take on the guardianship system, as the next item on their agenda.

Licenses were set to be issued to women starting on 24 June 2018. Saudi authorities also contacted women to drive campaigners. Around 15–18 May 2018, Loujain al-Hathloul, Eman al-Nafjan, Aisha Al-Mana, Aziza al-Yousef, Madeha al-Ajroush, and several other women and two men also involved in the women to drive movement and the anti male-guardianship campaign were detained by Saudi authorities. Human Rights Watch interpreted the purpose of the arrests as frightening "anyone expressing skepticism about the crown prince's rights agenda".

On 24 June 2018, as promised by Saudi authorities, several women received driving licences and started driving their cars. Many of the women to drive movement and anti male-guardianship women activists, including Loujain al-Hathloul, remained in detention as part of the 2018–2019 Saudi crackdown on feminists. As of 23 August 2018, twelve remained in detention without any legal charges laid against them and without legal representation.

In late November 2018, the Women to Drive campaigners detained in Dhahban Central Prison were tortured. According to Human Rights Watch, several of the women were lashed and given electric shocks, one was "made to hang for long periods of time from the ceiling" and one tried several times to commit suicide. As of 21 November 2018, the women had been publicly accused of "undermining state security and aiding enemies of the state" but had not yet been charged.

As of 20 November 2018, according to the Saudi newspaper Okaz, the women were to be tried at the Specialized Criminal Court, with prosecutors calling for prison terms of up to 20 years.

In late March 2019, the women presented their defence and described physical and sexual abuse they had endured in captivity. Aziza al-Yousef, Dr Rokaya Mohareb and Eman al-Nafjan were released on bail.

== International solidarity ==
=== United States ===
An international new media campaign started in the US to support women drivers in Saudi Arabia with tweets, pictures, and YouTube videos of people honking to support women drivers in Saudi Arabia, included Rep. Nancy Pelosi and race car driver Leilani Münter.

On 15 June 2011, women drivers in the United States organised a protest in solidarity with Saudi women, planning to encircle the Embassy of Saudi Arabia in Washington, D.C. In mid-June, three women from Minnesota, supported by an advocacy group, announced a gender discrimination complaint against Saudi Arabia's livery services in Rochester to coincide with the 2011 "Women2Drive" campaign.

=== Recording industry ===
The music video to the M.I.A. song "Bad Girls", released on 2 February 2012, is a protest piece in solidarity with the movement. Elizabeth Broomhall, writing in Arabian Business, appreciated M.I.A. for "pushing boundaries" to get the world to pay attention to women's right to drive in the kingdom, and for being a female artist who "finally" did something different. Lucy Jones of The Daily Telegraph praised the video for its stance against Saudi driving law.

== Aftermath ==
In 2024, Reema Juffali became the first Saudi Arabian woman to compete in an international race in her home country. She also founded Theeba Motorsport, which serves to increase access and participation to motorsports for Saudi Arabians. The company aims to create educational and internship programs as well as improve opportunities and representation in motor racing. Juffali said in an interview that “hopefully Saudi fans can see that there is a Saudi racing driver out there and it will get them to thinking that ‘this is something I can do!’. The overturn of the ban on driving for women has allowed young women to enter a previously inaccessible industry.

In 2025, former F1 driver Sebastian Vettel hosted the Race4Women event to aid the development of “grassroots karting” in Saudi Arabia. He sought to mentor and teach 20 young women about racing and motorsports principles. Vettel also spoke about how Saudi Arabia is becoming more open and how a new generation of women and girls will be able “to do a lot of the things their mothers weren’t able or allowed to do.”

== Role of the Internet ==
Saudis were not connected to internet access until January 1999, two years after King Fahd approved public internet access. The government has had the Internet since 1994, but only state academic, medical, and research institutions were allowed access. However, in 2013, the Women2Drive movement was entirely conceived using the internet. Social media platforms including Twitter, Facebook, and Youtube were tools that helped women spread the word and create more momentum.

Utilizing the internet to create a foundation that reached more people and accelerated the movement’s visibility, which brought it to the media’s attention. Many news channels including the BBC, CNN, and Reuters covered the arrests of activists and then the eventual change in Saudi law that legally allowed women to drive.

The Women2Drive Facebook page garnered over 10,000 followers (with numbers growing to 32,000 as of 2025) and in 2011, an online petition addressed to King Abdullah was posted, urging him to grant women the right to drive. The same message was also seen on Saudi websites and shared via emails. Facebook was once again used in 2013 to facilitate and outline logistical details for the October protest.

== See also ==
- 2011–2012 Saudi Arabian protests
- Anti male-guardianship campaign
- Reema Juffali, female Saudi racing driver
- Women in the Arab Spring
- Women's rights in Saudi Arabia
