= Saud al-Qahtani =

Saudi Arabian consultant and former royal court advisor

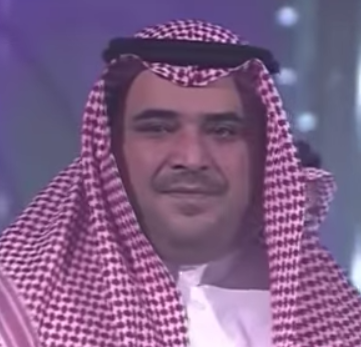

General Supervisor of the Center for Studies and Media Affairs
- In office 2012–2019
- Monarchs: Abdullah bin Abdulaziz Al Saud; Salman bin Abdulaziz Al Saud

Personal details
- Born: July 7, 1978 (age 48) Riyadh, Saudi Arabia
- Education: King Saud University; Naif Arab University for Security Sciences
- Known for: Saudi royal court advisor Alleged involvement in the killing of Jamal Khashoggi.

Military service
- Allegiance: Saudi Arabia
- Branch/service: Royal Saudi Air Force
- Rank: Sergeant
- Commands: Tiger squad

Saud bin Abdullah al-Qahtani (Arabic: سعود بن عبد الله القحطاني; born July 7, 1978) is a Saudi Arabian consultant and former royal court advisor. Prior to his dismissal in late 2018, he worked as an advisor to King Abdullah of Saudi Arabia and crown prince Mohammed bin Salman.

He oversaw the killing of Jamal Khashoggi, among other interrogations and torture. It was after Khashoggi's assassination that he was dismissed. In December, Turkish officials issued a warrant for his arrest for the murder of Khashoggi. On November 15, 2018, he was sanctioned as a Specially Designated National under GLOMAG by the US Treasury's Office of Foreign Assets Control. As of March 2019 he is under house arrest. In April 2019, as a response to Khashoggi's murder, the United States Department of State sanctioned al-Qahtani and 15 others, banning them from entering the United States.

Described as a "nationalist ideologue", al-Qahtani served as a major influence over Mohammed bin Salman's foreign and domestic policies. Prior to his dismissal, his official post was General Supervisor of the Center for Studies and Media Affairs.

== Early life and education ==
Al-Qahtani was born in Riyadh, Saudi Arabia, on July 7, 1978. He received a bachelor's degree in law from King Saud University, and graduated with the rank of sergeant from the Royal Saudi Air Force. Al-Qahtani subsequently obtained a master's degree in criminal justice from the Naif Arab University for Security Sciences (NAUSS).

== Career ==
After obtaining a law degree, al-Qahtani taught law-related courses at the security colleges in Saudi Arabia. Later he worked as an adviser to the deputy chief of the royal court. He had previously worked as a journalist for Elaph and as a contributor for Al Riyadh. In 2003, he served as a legal advisor to the secretariat to then crown prince Abdullah bin Abdul Aziz. In the early 2000s he was hired by Khaled al-Tuwaijri to protect Saudi Arabia's reputation via an "electronic army". In 2008, he became responsible for media monitoring for the royal court. Al-Qahtani worked extensively with Hacking Team for espionage purposes. He was also reportedly active on the Hack Forums, using the username Nokia2mon2.

He was officially appointed an advisor to the royal court in 2012 and given the rank of minister in 2015.

He was also President and Chairman of the Saudi Federation of Cyber Security, Programming, and Drones (SAFCSP). Al-Qahtani also served on the board of directors of King Abdul Aziz University, the MiSK Foundation, the Royal Commission for Al-Ula, and the Saudi Union for Cyber Security and Programming.

=== 2016 US lobbying, foreign affairs ===
In 2016, Al-Qahtani signed on two US lobbying firms: BGR Group "will provide public relations and media management services for The Center [for Studies and Media Affairs at The Saudi Royal Court], which includes both traditional and social media forums," for which they were to be paid US$500,000.00, while Squire Patton Boggs were to be paid $100,000 per month, plus expenses, for "legal and strategic policy advice and advocacy on foreign policy and related issues in the U.S. Government".

During the 2017–18 Qatar diplomatic crisis, al-Qahtani urged Saudi citizens to identify suspected supporters of Qatar through a "Black List" hashtag on Twitter.

He reportedly oversaw the interrogation of Saad al-Hariri during the 2017 Lebanon–Saudi Arabia dispute.

=== Internal Saudi affairs ===
In 2017, al-Qahtani was an instrumental figure in the 2017 Saudi Arabian purge, luring targets to The Ritz-Carlton, Riyadh by arranging fake meetings there. Al-Qahtani reportedly pressured detainees to sign over assets under threat of torture and imprisonment.

In 2018, al-Qahtani reportedly oversaw the torture of several female activists in Saudi Arabia including Loujain al-Hathloul. The activists, who had been campaigning against the male guardianship system and for the right to drive, were reportedly subjected to sexual assault, electrical torture, flogging, and threats of rape and murder. Al-Qahtani was personally present during at least one of the interrogation session and is reported to have personally threatened to rape, murder, and dump the body of one of the activists into the sewers.

=== Assassination of Jamal Khashoggi ===
The United States intelligence community has identified al-Qahtani as the ringleader of the assassination of Saudi dissident and Washington Post journalist Jamal Khashoggi. Al-Qahtani acted as the head of what American intelligence officials called the Saudi Rapid Intervention Group, which has reportedly undertaken at least a dozen operations since 2017.

Al-Qahtani had been in contact with Khashoggi since at least October 2017, alerting Khashoggi that his public writings were being monitored. Al-Qahtani was reportedly involved with luring Khashoggi back to Saudi Arabia, suggesting to Khashoggi that he might be able to work with Crown Prince Mohammed bin Salman.

After the assassination of Khashoggi in the Saudi consulate in Istanbul on October 2, 2018, al-Qahtani was dismissed as the royal court's supervisor of media affairs. According to Arab and Turkish sources, al-Qahtani organized the Khashoggi operation, even calling into the consulate via Skype to talk with and insult Khashoggi before telling the assembled team: "Bring me the head of the dog." The Saudi state prosecutor announced on 15 November 2018 that 11 agents were indicted and 5 charged with murdering Khashoggi. He added that al-Qahtani met the leader of the team that killed Khashoggi before it was dispatched to Turkey. Al-Qahtani was not arrested. Saudi officials have never revealed the whereabouts of Khashoggi's remains.

Prince Mohammed bin Salman exchanged at least 11 messages with al-Qahtani in the hours before and after the assassination of Khashoggi, leading the Central Intelligence Agency to conclude that Mohammed ordered Khashoggi's murder. A member of the Saudi hit team, Maher Mutreb, also called al-Qahtani to inform him that the operation has been completed. However, the message-exchange element of the report was contested by Saudi Arabia based on a confidential Saudi-commissioned investigation.

In November 2018, Saudi authorities confirmed that he was being investigated and was barred to leave the country. On December 5, 2018, the Istanbul Chief Public Prosecutor's Office requested, and was issued, an arrest warrant for Saud al-Qahtani for the murder of Khashoggi. Saudi Minister of Foreign Affairs Adel al-Jubeir rejected Turkey's request for al-Qahtani's extradition on December 9, stating that Saudi Arabia does not extradite its citizens.

In January 2019, the Saudi authorities were, according to The Washington Post, refusing to confirm the whereabouts of al-Qahtani. There were concerns that he could be influencing the investigation itself. Khalil Jahshan, executive director of the Arab Center based in Washington DC, stated in an interview with Al Jazeera, that al-Qahtani's "disappearance" was a "natural progression of [Saudi Arabia's] investigation" and is likely used as a strategy to keep crown prince Mohammed bin Salman protected from accusations regarding Khashoggi's murder: "They have sheltered some of the key players accused of being involved [in the murder] whether by Turkey or by the international community. The intention of the Saudi campaign right now is to keep the crown prince clear of any accusations with regards to the murder of Khashoggi."

In December 2019, Saudi state TV reported that al-Qahtani was being investigated for his role in the murder of Khashoggi but was cleared of any charges as there was no proof of involvement. Five others were sentenced to death and another three given a combined 24-year prison sentence. Agnès Callamard called the Saudi trials "the antithesis of justice", and "a mockery".

=== Hacking ===
Al-Qahtani was known to procure offensive hacking tools on behalf of the Kingdom of Saudi Arabia, among them tools made by the Italian company Hacking Team.

On March 5, 2019, The Guardian newspaper reported that a strain had developed between King Salman and his son, Crown Prince Mohammad bin Salman. March 7, 2019, al-Qahtani reportedly signed an order instructing "a technical team to carry out the "penetration" of The Guardian's computer servers "in complete secrecy"".

According to an analysis by FTI Consulting, al-Qahtani procured the tools used to hack Jeff Bezos' mobile phone (CEO of Amazon and owner of The Washington Post) - five months before the murder of Jamal Khashoggi. FTI Consulting was asked to look at Bezos' devices after the US tabloid The National Enquirer (publisher American Media Inc owned by David Pecker) exposed Bezos' relationship with his then mistress Lauren Sanchez. Bezos accused Pecker of trying to blackmail him with the threat of publishing "intimate photos" he allegedly sent to Sanchez. Bezos' team suggested it was an orchestrated take down by American Media Inc and the Kingdom of Saudi Arabia.

The Guardian reported that a WhatsApp message sent from the personal account of Crown Prince Mohammad bin Salman was the source of the hack. A UN report came to the same conclusion, experts lent their weight to allegations that Crown Prince Mohammad bin Salman hacked the mobile phone of Bezos to “influence, if not silence” The Washington Post's reporting. Agnes Callamard, UN special rapporteur on summary executions and extrajudicial killings, and David Kaye, UN special rapporteur on freedom of expression, issued the joint statement, which emphasized that "at a time when Saudi Arabia was supposedly investigating the killing of Mr. Khashoggi, and prosecuting those it deemed responsible, it was clandestinely waging a massive online campaign against Mr. Bezos and Amazon targeting him principally as the owner of The Washington Post," ... "the alleged hacking of Mr. Bezos's phone, and those of others, demands immediate investigation by US and other relevant authorities, including investigation of the continuous, multi-year, direct and personal involvement of the crown prince in efforts to target perceived opponents." UN investigators concluded that Saudi use of the Pegasus spyware, which enables remote surveillance of cellphones, from controversial Israeli technology firm NSO Group was the “most likely explanation” the hacking attack against Bezos. Facebook, which owns WhatsApp, has since sued NSO Group in America.

=== Later events ===
In August 2019, critic İyad el-Baghdadi tweeted that al-Qahtani had been poisoned. In September 2019, Bloomberg News noted the poisoning rumors, but stated that two people close to al-Qahtani maintained that he was still alive. On 8 October 2021, The Guardian reported signs of Al-Qahtani’s return to the court of Mohammed bin Salman. This news is backing reports since May, June and August 2021 that several messages of support have appeared on pro-government social media accounts, praising the man as "hero", "patriot" and "leader".

== See also ==
- Ahmad Asiri (general)
- Salah Mohammed Tubaigy
