= Loujain al-Hathloul =

Saudi activist and political prisoner

- لجين الهذلول
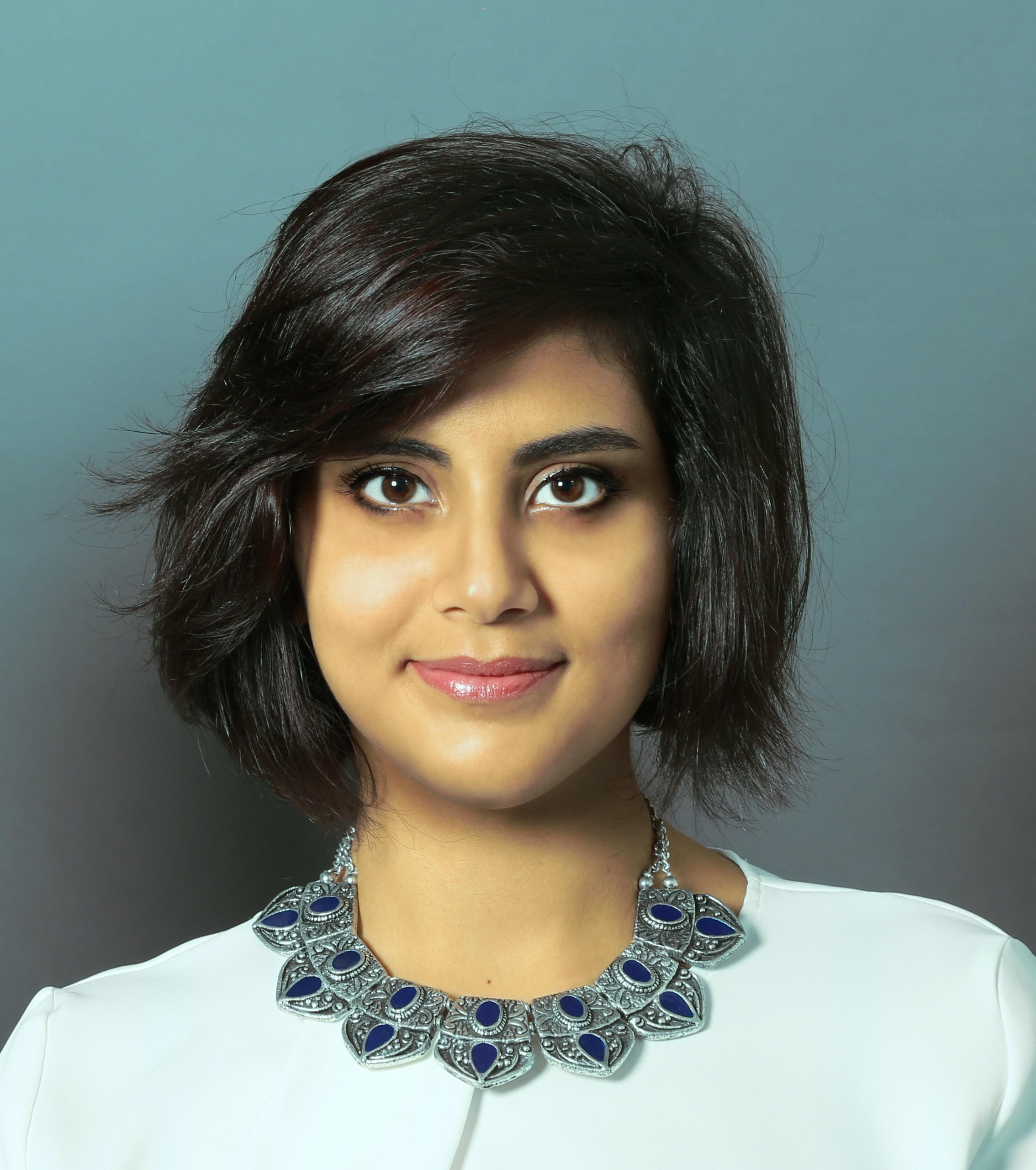
- Al-Hathloul in 2016
- Born: 31 July 1989 (age 37); Jeddah, Saudi Arabia
- Education: University of British Columbia
- Known for: Defying female driving ban in Saudi Arabia
- Spouse: Fahad Albutairi (m. 2014; div. 2018)
- Family: Lina al-Hathloul (sister)
- Awards: Václav Havel Human Rights Prize (2020)

Loujain al-Hathloul (Arabic: لجين الهذلول Lujjayn al-Hadhlūl; born 31 July 1989) is a Saudi women's rights activist, social media figure, and political prisoner. She was arrested on several occasions for defying the ban on women driving in Saudi Arabia. In May 2018, she and several prominent women's rights activists were kidnapped in the United Arab Emirates (UAE) and deported to Saudi Arabia, where they were charged with "attempting to destabilise the kingdom." Her ex-husband, Saudi stand-up comedian Fahad al-Butairi, was forcibly returned from Jordan to the Kingdom and placed under arrest.

For her women's rights activism, Al-Hathloul was awarded the 2019 PEN America /Barbey Freedom to Write Award and the 2020 Václav Havel Human Rights Prize. She was one of Time magazine's "100 Most Influential People of 2019".

She was released from prison on 10 February 2021. As of July 2025, she is under a de facto travel ban.

== Early life and education ==
She is a graduate of the University of British Columbia.

== Women's rights activism (2014–2017) ==
Al-Hathloul is known both for her role in the Women to Drive Movement and in opposing the Saudi male guardianship system. On 1 December 2014, she was arrested and detained for 73 days after an attempt to cross the border in her car from the UAE to Saudi Arabia, on charges related to defying the female driving ban in the kingdom, despite having a UAE driver's license. Al-Hathloul attempted to stand in Saudi local elections in December 2015, the first vote in Saudi Arabia to include women, but was barred.

In September 2016, along with 14,000 others, al-Hathloul signed a petition to King Salman asking for the male guardianship system to be abolished. On 4 June 2017, she was arrested and detained at King Fahd International Airport in Dammam. The reason for the arrest was not officially disclosed, although Amnesty International believed it was for her human rights activism, and al-Hathloul was not allowed access to a lawyer or any contact with her family.

She was targeted in 2017 by a team of U.S. mercenaries who surveilled dissidents on behalf of the United Arab Emirates under a secret program called Project Raven, which categorized her as a “national security threat” and hacked into her iPhone.

== 2018–2020 kidnapping and torture ==
Loujain Al-Hathloul was kidnapped from the UAE in March 2018 and deported to Saudi Arabia, where she was arrested for a few days and then put under a travel ban. Al-Hathloul was detained again on the eve of 15 May 2018, along with Eman al-Nafjan, Aisha al-Mana, Aziza al-Yousef, Madeha al-Ajroush and some men involved in campaigning for women's rights in Saudi Arabia. Human Rights Watch interpreted the purpose of the arrests as frightening "anyone expressing skepticism about the crown prince's rights agenda".

In June 2018, women were granted the right to drive in Saudi Arabia, while al-Hathloul remained under arrest. According to ALQST and Amnesty International, Saudi Arabia tortured al-Hathloul and several other women detained for their women's rights activities. Torture techniques, which included being beaten on their feet, given electric shocks, and whipped, were used in a torture location called "the hotel" or "the officer's guesthouse".

According to Loujain al-Hathloul's sister Alia (who lives in Brussels, Belgium), torture techniques used specifically against Loujain also included beating, electric shocks and waterboarding, and the torture occurred between May and August 2018. Loujain al-Hathloul's parents stated that Loujain's "thighs were blackened by bruises" when they visited and that Loujain "was shaking uncontrollably, unable to hold her grip, to walk or sit normally" during their visit. According to Alia al-Hathloul, Saud al-Qahtani visited al-Hathloul during her torture, laughing at her, threatening to rape and kill her and to dispose of her body in the sewage system, and he tortured her "all night during Ramadan". Alia al-Hathloul stated that she had expected that under Saudi norms about women, her sister would not have been tortured.

In December 2018, al-Hathloul was in jail with her fellow activists at Dhahban Central Prison. According to her brother Walid al-Hathloul (who lives in Ontario, Canada), al-Hathloul was by February 2019 held in al-Ha'ir prison.

On 1 March 2019, the office of Saudi Arabia's public prosecutor announced that the preliminary investigation had been completed and they would be preparing to try al-Hathloul and other activists in court for undermining state security. On 13 March 2019, the trial began, although the charges were not specified and reporters and diplomats were barred from attending. In April 2019, a hearing on her case was postponed without a reason being given.

In May 2020, her trial was indefinitely postponed because of the COVID-19 pandemic, which raised concerns over her health inside the Saudi prison.

On 11 August 2020, her other sister Lina al-Hathloul (a Nobel Peace Prize-nominated campaigner), expressed fear about the possibility of the activist being tortured again in the Saudi prison, as she has not been heard from for over 60 days.

Loujain al-Hathloul had been held in incommunicado detention for three months. When she learned that other detainees were allowed to call their families, she went on a six-day hunger strike to demand the same. She was then allowed to meet her parents. Saudi Arabia has restricted many prominent human rights activists, clerics, and royal family members from contacting their family or lawyers, raising concerns over their safety and wellbeing.

On 15 September 2020, around 30 countries called on Saudi Arabia to release jailed women's rights activist Loujain al-Hathloul and four other women in detention who campaigned for women to drive.

On 8 October 2020, the European Parliament called for Saudi Arabia to release all the human rights activists, particularly the campaigners for the Women to drive movement, including Loujain al-Hathloul, in a resolution passed against the Kingdom's human rights records. Highlighting the situation of these dissidents and migrants in the country's detention centers, the MEPs also urged the European Union states to cut down their representation at Saudi's G20 Summit.

At the end of October 2020, Loujain al-Hathloul started a hunger strike. According to Hathloul's sisters, Lina and Alia, who broke the news on Twitter, the activist started her hunger strike on 26 October 2020 against the al-Hair prison administration, demanding regular contact with her family and siblings. On 10 November 2020, the Saudi ambassador to the U.K. said that Saudi Arabia was considering releasing women's rights activist Loujain Al-Hatloul, ahead of its hosting of the G20 summit in November. The decision was considered after the international political pressure to release her, as she was on a weeks-long hunger strike.

On 25 November 2020, after the Riyadh G20 summit was concluded, Loujain al-Hathloul was transferred to a special court for terrorism and national security crimes. Her sister, Lina al-Hathloul, feared that Loujain was being pressured into giving false confessions, which could be used against her during the trial.

On 29 November 2020, seven European envoys released a joint statement condemning the continued detention of five women's rights activists, including Loujain al-Hathloul, whose case was referred to a special court for terrorism-related offences. The envoys demanded the release of Hathloul, who had been in jail since May 2018 after a sweep targeted prominent critics of the kingdom's former law barring women from driving.

On 28 December 2020, al-Hathloul was sentenced to five years and eight months in prison. On 10 February 2021, al-Hathloul's sister announced on Twitter that she had been released from prison.

On 10 March 2021, al-Hathloul's sister said that a Riyadh court upheld the sentencing of Loujain. At the time of her release from prison, she was placed under a travel ban, which was due to expire on 12 November 2023. As of July 2025, Loujain says she is still unable to travel abroad, although Saudi officials said she was not subject to any restrictions "other than those set out in the final court judgment."

In 2021, she gave her iPhone to the Canadian Citizen Lab for forensic examination after it was hacked, leading to the discovery of spyware by the Israeli NSO group. Technical information uncovered by Citizen Lab allowed Apple to warn thousands of its users, including U.S. State Department employees in Uganda. Researchers also discovered that spyware from QuaDream, another Israeli vendor, took advantage of the same "zero-click" vulnerability in iPhones.

In December 2021, al-Hathloul announced she and the Electronic Frontier Foundation would be suing three former American intelligence officers, Marc Baier, Ryan Adams, and Daniel Gericke, for hacking her communications devices, leading to her kidnapping in the UAE and deportation to Saudi Arabia. The three officers had already admitted to providing the UAE with hacking services and equipment in a separate case.

== Recognition ==
She was recognized as one of the BBC's 100 women of 2017.

Al-Hathloul was ranked third in the "Top 100 Most Powerful Arab Women 2015" list. In March 2019, PEN America announced that Nouf Abdulaziz, al-Hathloul, and Eman al-Nafjan would receive the 2019 PEN America/Barbey Freedom to Write Award. Al-Hathloul was named one of Time magazine's "100 Most Influential People of 2019".

Al-Hathloul was nominated for the Nobel Peace Prize in 2019 and 2020. In April 2021, she was announced as the winner of the 2020 Václav Havel Human Rights Prize.

The children's book Loujain Dreams of Sunflowers: A Story Inspired by Loujain Alhathloul, written by Lina al-Hathloul and Uma Mishra-Newbery and illustrated by Rebecca Green, was published by minedition in 2022.

== See also ==
- Human rights in Saudi Arabia
  - Saudi Civil and Political Rights Association (as of 2018, most key members detained)
  - European Saudi Organisation for Human Rights (active as of 2018)
