= Aziza al-Yousef =

Saudi human rights activist

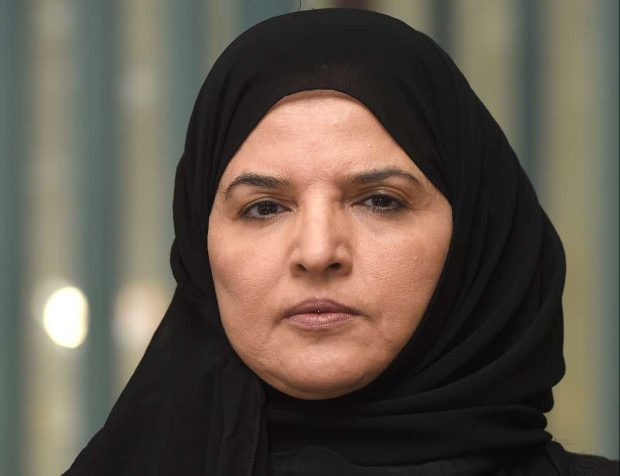
- Born: 1957 or 1958 (age 68–69); Saudi Arabia
- Occupation: computer science professor (retired)
- Known for: Women's rights (driving, male guardianship) activist
- Children: 5

Aziza al-Yousef is a Saudi Arabian women's rights activist and academic. She was detained by Saudi authorities in May 2018 along with Loujain al-Hathloul and five others.

As of November 2018, she was apparently being held in the Dhahban Central Prison. In late March 2019, the women presented their defence and described enduring physical and sexual abuse in captivity. Aziza al-Yousef, together with Eman al-Nafjan and Dr Rokaya Mohareb were released on bail.

== Biography ==
Al-Yousef studied briefly at King Saud University as a teenager before moving to the United States to study at Virginia Commonwealth University. She completed her master's degree back at King Saud University.

Al-Yousef taught computer science at King Saud University for 28 years before retiring.

In 2013, al-Yousef was arrested along with fellow activist Eman al-Nafjan for driving through Riyadh by themselves. They were forced to sign a pledge that they would not drive again. In 2013, al-Youssef launched a global awareness campaign following the rape of a 5-year girl by her father, a Saudi cleric.

In 2016, she helped to lead a campaign against the male guardianship system in Saudi Arabia. She "attempted to deliver to the Royal Advisory Council a 14,700-signature petition seeking to abolish the guardianship regulations but she was rebuffed and told to mail it."

Around 15–18 May 2018, al-Yousef was detained by Saudi authorities, along with Loujain al-Hathloul, Iman al-Nafjan, Aisha Almane, Madeha al-Ajroush and two men involved in women's rights campaigning. Human Rights Watch interpreted the purpose of the arrests as frightening "anyone expressing skepticism about the crown prince's rights agenda". Saudi authorities accused the arrested activists of having "suspicious contact with foreign parties", providing financial support to "hostile elements abroad" and recruiting government workers.

In 2019, it was reported that the Saudi authorities had detained her son, Salah al-Haidar.
