= Saudi anti male-guardianship campaign =

Saudi Arabia women's movement

The Saudi anti male-guardianship campaign is an ongoing campaign by Saudi women against the requirement under the law to obtain permission from their male guardian for activities such as getting a job, travelling internationally or getting married. Wajeha al-Huwaider deliberately tried to travel internationally without male guardianship permission in 2009 and encouraged other women to do likewise. Women activists wrote a letter to the Saudi Minister of Labor and brought media attention to the issue in 2011. A 14,000-signature petition was given to royal authorities by Aziza al-Yousef in 2016 following a Human Rights Watch report on male guardianship. A crackdown against the activists took place in mid-May 2018, with 13 arrests as of 22 May 2018. Several of the women remained in prison as of December 2018. Some of the women activists were tortured, some of them in the supervision of Saud al-Qahtani, a close advisor of Crown Prince Mohammad bin Salman.

== Background ==
Women in the pre-Roman Arabian kingdom of Nabataea were independent legal persons able to sign contracts in their own name. In Nabataea women were free to conduct legal contracts in their own name with no male guardian, unlike in Greek and Roman law, and in Saudi Arabia where the guardian is central to the clerics’ idea of a moral public sphere. The Wahhabi interpretation of sharia requires a “muhrim” — father, husband, brother or son — to accompany women in public, allow them to travel and attest their legal contracts. In the late twentieth century, after the Grand Mosque seizure in 1979, King Khalid gave more power to religious groups. In 2016, Human Rights Watch described the male guardianship situation in Saudi Arabia, stating that a Saudi woman's life "is controlled by a man from birth until death". As of 2018, any adult woman in Saudi Arabia is required to obtain approval from her male guardian for activities such as accessing healthcare, getting a job, travelling or getting married.

== Unauthorised travel protest (2006) ==
Wajeha al-Huwaider is a Saudi women's rights activist who in 2003 was banned by Saudi authorities from publishing her opinions in Saudi media and was arrested again after holding a women's rights street protest in August 2006. In June 2009, she protested against male guardianship by trying three times to enter Bahrain without permission from her male guardian. She was refused departure from Saudi Arabia at the Bahraini border all three times because of her lack of male-guardian authorisation.

Al-Huwaider encouraged other Saudi women to carry out the same attempted border crossings without male guardian approval, with the aim of ending the male guardianship system.

== Appeal to Ministry of Labor (2011) ==
Late in 2011, during the 2011–12 Saudi Arabian protests, Saudi women started a campaign against the Saudi Ministry of Labor requirement for guardian approval for employment. The group contacted the media and argued that women's equality is established in the eighth article of the Saudi Arabian constitution, and that Islamic scholars generally do not see male guardian approval as a requirement for a woman to be employed.

The group held workshops on the issue and studied Islamic religious arguments in relation to male guardianship.

== Petition to King and wave of activism (2016) ==
In July 2016, Human Rights Watch issued a detailed report on male guardianship in Saudi Arabia. The report brought attention to the topic, and Twitter hashtags #IAmMyOwnGuardian and #StopEnslavingSaudiWomen became popular. Several months later, in September 2016, 2500 women sent telegrams to King Salman, and fourteen thousand people, including Aziza al-Yousef, Loujain al-Hathloul and Eman al-Nafjan, signed a petition, calling for the male guardianship system to be fully abolished. Al-Yousef went to the royal court to deliver the petition. Human Rights Watch described the 2016 wave of activism against male guardianship as "incredible and unprecedented".

== 2018–2019 crackdown ==
During 2018–2019 there was a crackdown on women's rights activists in Saudi Arabia engaged in the women to drive movement and the Saudi anti male-guardianship campaign and of their supporters, with waves of arrests mainly in May 2018 and April 2019. The arrests were described in June 2018 by a United Nations special rapporteurs as a "crackdown" taking place "on a wide scale across" Saudi Arabia; the special rapporteur called for the "urgent release" of the detainees. Six of the women arrestees were tortured, some in the presence of the Crown Prince's advisor Saud al-Qahtani.

== 2019 online campaign ==
In early January 2019, Rahaf Mohammed sought her right of asylum while transiting Bangkok airport, on the basis of what she stated was physical and psychological abuse by her family. Her situation gained wide international media attention and support from online social networks, saving her from being deported according to ESOHR-appointed lawyer François Zimeray. Following the international online campaign Canadian authorities offered her asylum after she was given refugee status by the UNHCR. Anger against the assassination of Jamal Khashoggi constituting a triggering factor in the online support according to Thomson Reuters. The online reaction included a Twitter revival of the anti male-guardianship campaign, with the trending slogan, "Remove guardianship and we won't all migrate".

== Moves toward equality ==
In August 2019, a royal decree was published in the Saudi official gazette Umm al-Qura that would allow Saudi women over 21 to obtain passports and travel abroad without male guardian permission. The decree also gave women the rights to register a marriage, divorce or birth or obtain official family documents; and gave the mother the right to be a legal guardian of a child. The date of the measures officially come into force was not stated in the decree.

Madawi al-Rasheed interpreted the weakening of the guardianship system as an effect (a "second victory") of the Saudi feminist movement, following the 2018 lifting of the women driving ban. She referred to remaining guardianship restrictions including the need for male guardian permission to marry, leave prison or a domestic violence shelter, and to work, study or seek medical care. Al-Rasheed argued that many of the anti male-guardianship campaigners wouldn't be "able to celebrate" the new announcement, due to imprisonment, travel bans or exile.

== See also ==
- Women to drive movement in Saudi Arabia
- Chaperone (social)
- Manahel al-Otaibi, women's rights activist who was convicted of terrorism after tweeting support for the anti-male guardianship campaign
