= 2017–2019 Saudi Arabian purge =

Mass arrests by Mohammed bin Salman regime

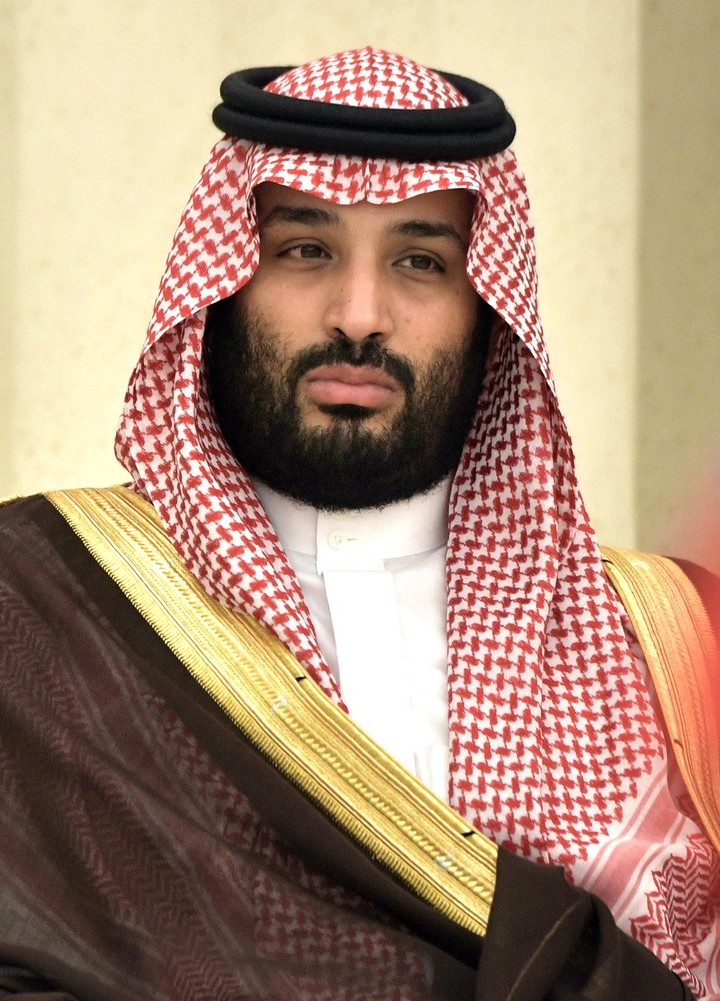
- Crown Prince Mohammed bin Salman
- Date: 4 November 2017 – 30 January 2019
- Location: Saudi Arabia
- Type: Governmental purge
- Arrests: 381

The 2017–2019 Saudi Arabian purge was the mass arrest of a number of prominent Saudi Arabian princes, government ministers, and business people in Saudi Arabia on 4 November 2017. It took place weeks after the creation of an anti-corruption committee led by Crown Prince Mohammed bin Salman.

The purge helped centralize political powers in the hands of bin Salman and undermine the pre-existing structure of consensus-based governance among Saudi elites. The arrests resulted in the final sidelining of the faction of King Abdullah, and Mohammed bin Salman's complete consolidation of control of all three branches of the security forces. It also cemented bin Salman's supremacy over business elites in Saudi Arabia and resulted in a mass seizure of assets by the bin Salman regime.

The detainees were confined at the Ritz-Carlton hotel in Riyadh (which had hosted the announcement for the creation of the planned city of Neom on 24 October 2017), which subsequently stopped accepting new bookings and told guests to leave. Private jets were also grounded to prevent suspects from fleeing the country.

As many as 500 people were rounded up in the sweep. Saudi Arabian banks froze more than 2,000 domestic accounts as part of the crackdown. According to The Wall Street Journal, the Saudi government targeted cash and assets worth up to $800 billion. The Saudi authorities claimed that amount was composed of assets worth around $300 billion to $400 billion that they can prove was linked to corruption. The anti-corruption committee ended its mission on 30 January 2019.

== Allegations ==
The allegations include money laundering, bribery, extorting officials, and taking advantage of public office for personal gain.

=== Tiger Squad ===
According to the Middle East Eye, an assassination campaign against critics of the monarchy was carried out in parallel to the overt arrests of the purge, by the Tiger Squad, which was formed in 2017 and as of October 2018, consisted of 50 secret service and military personnel. The group members were recruited from different branches of the Saudi forces, directing several areas of expertise.

The Tiger Squad allegedly assassinates dissidents using varying covert methods, such as planned car and aircraft accidents, house fires, and poisoning at hospitals during routine health checkups. Five members of that squad were also part of the 15-member death squad who assassinated Jamal Khashoggi.

According to the sources, bin Salman chose silent murder instead of arrest as the method of repression due to the fact that only arresting the dissidents would spark international pressure to release them, whereas silent murder covers it up quietly. Prince Mansour bin Muqrin died when his personal aircraft crashed, although it was allegedly shot down as he tried to flee the country from the purge and then made to appear as an accident. Meshal Saad al-Bostani, a member of the Tiger Squad and a lieutenant in the Saudi air force was allegedly behind the murder and he himself would die in a car accident in Riyadh while according to a Turkish news outlet he had actually been murdered by poison.

Another victim was Suliman Abdul Rahman al-Thuniyan, a Saudi court judge who was murdered by injection of a deadly virus when he visited a hospital for a regular health checkup. This took place after he had opposed bin Salman's 2030 Economic Vision.

=== Corruption ===
King Salman stated that the anti-corruption committee need to "identify offences, crimes and persons and entities involved in cases of public corruption". He also referred to the "exploitation by some of the weak souls who have put their own interests above the public interest, in order to illicitly accrue money".

=== Extremism ===
On 24 October 2017 Mohammad bin Salman, who ordered the arrests, told investors in Riyadh that "We are returning to what we were before, a country of moderate Islam that is open to all religions and to the world". He also pledged to counter extremism.

== List of involved people ==
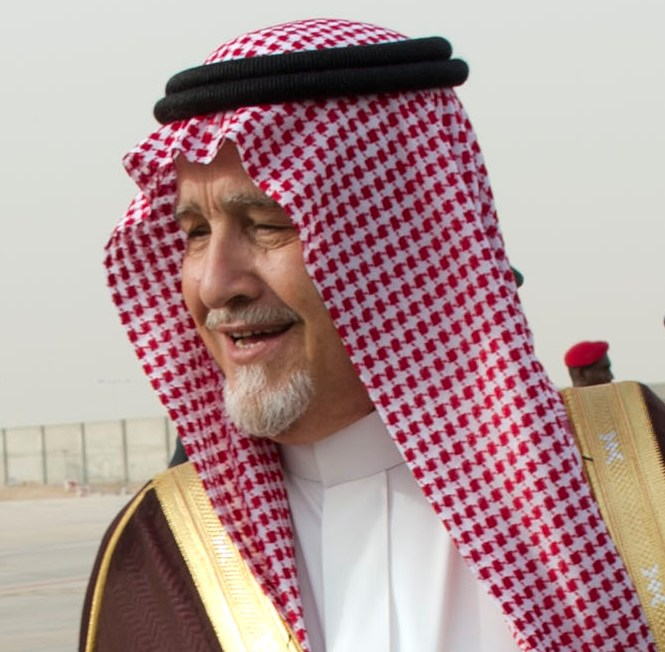
Fahd bin Abdullah

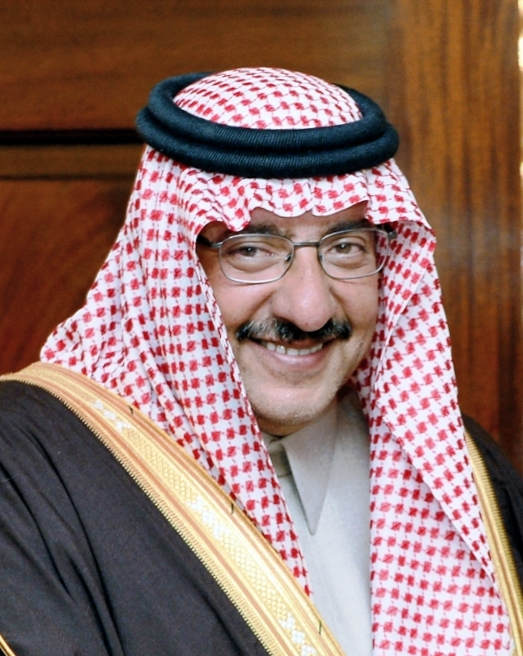
Muhammad bin Nayef

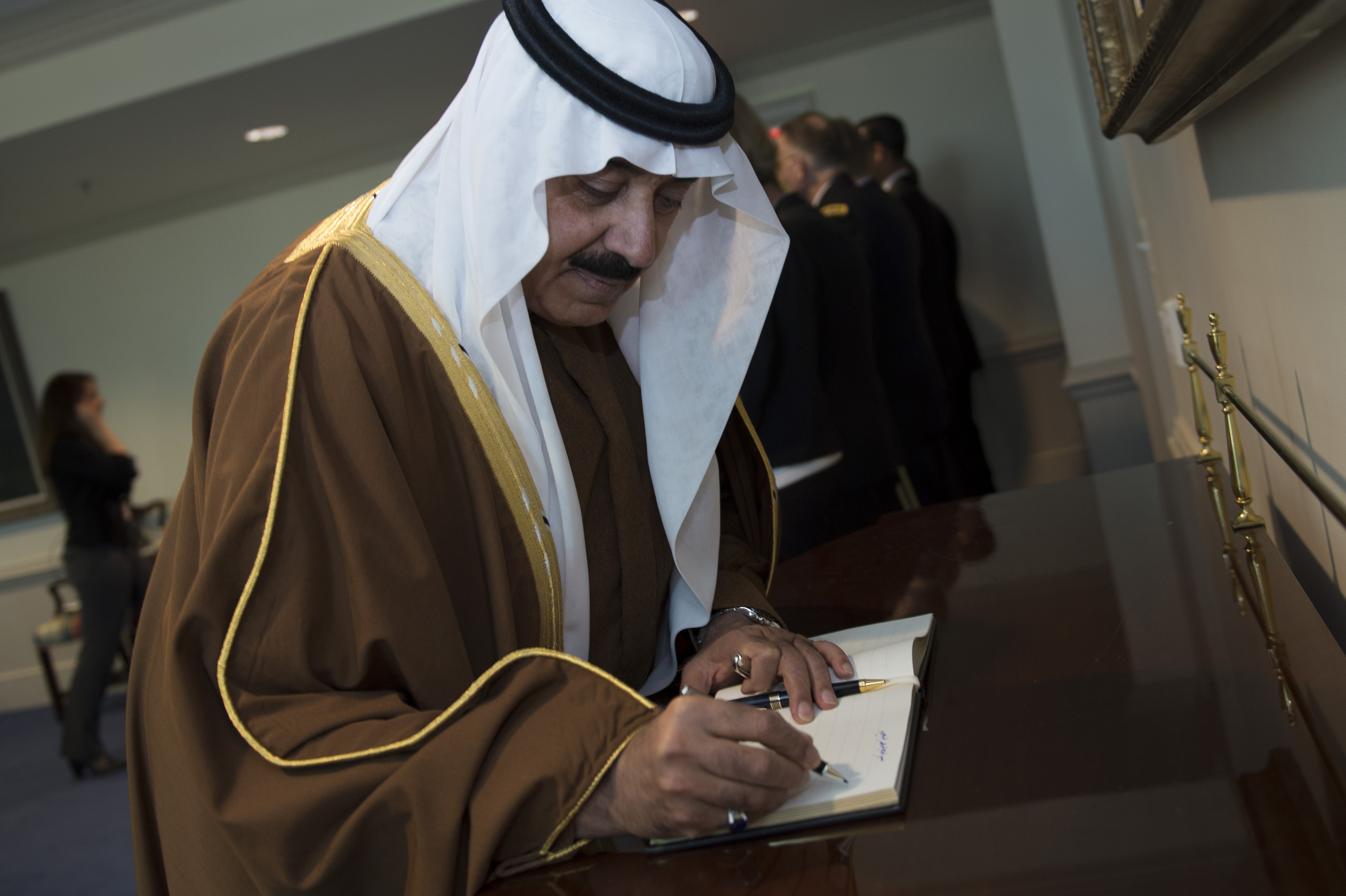
Mutaib bin Abdullah

Those arrested, detained, sanctioned or removed from their posts include, but are not limited to:

=== Royals ===
==== Detained ====
- Prince Al-Waleed bin Talal, billionaire businessman (Released 27 January 2018, according to Agence France-Presse)
- Prince Fahd bin Abdullah, former deputy defense minister
- Queen Fahda bint Falah, wife of King Salman and mother of Mohammad bin Salman himself. Under house arrest.
- Prince Khaled bin Talal, brother of al-Waleed and businessman
- Prince Mohammed bin Nayef, former Crown Prince of Saudi Arabia and former interior minister. Under house arrest.
- Prince Mutaib bin Abdullah, former head of Saudi Arabian National Guard and son of King Abdullah. He is seen as the most powerful of those arrested.
- Princess Reem bint al-Waleed bin Talal, daughter of al-Waleed bin Talal and businesswoman
- Prince Turki bin Abdullah, another son of King Abdullah and former governor of Riyadh Province
- Prince Faisal bin Abdullah, former head of the Saudi Red Crescent Society and another son of King Abdullah.
- Prince Mishaal bin Abdullah, a former governor of Mecca and Najran provinces and another son of King Abdullah
- Prince Turki bin Nasser, former head of the presidency of meteorology and environment
- Prince Turki bin Mohammed bin Saud Al Kabeer, former advisor at royal court

==== Uncertain status ====
- Prince Abdulaziz bin Fahd, youngest son of King Fahd. There were rumors that Abdul Aziz, age 44, was killed while resisting arrest, but the Saudi information ministry released a statement saying that the prince was "alive and well."
- Prince Mansour bin Muqrin, deputy governor of Asir and son of former Crown Prince Muqrin bin Abdulaziz. He was killed in a helicopter crash, though unconfirmed allegations have been made that his helicopter was shot down while he was attempting to flee the country.

==== Sanctioned ====
- Prince Bandar bin Sultan Al Saud, former Secretary General of the National Security Council and former head of the General Intelligence Presidency

=== Politicians ===
==== Detained ====
- Adel Fakeih, former Economy and Planning Minister
- Ibrahim Abdulaziz Al-Assaf, former finance minister
- Khaled al-Tuwaijri, former head of royal court
- Mohammad al-Tobaishi, former head of protocol at the Royal Court

=== Military officers ===
==== Detained ====
- Admiral Abdullah bin Sultan bin Mohammed Al-Sultan, Royal Saudi Navy Commander.
- Major General Ali Al Qahtani, Saudi Arabian Army. He died in custody.

=== Businessmen and professionals ===
==== Detained ====
- Abdulrahman Fakieh, businessman
- Amr Al-Dabbagh, businessman, CEO of Al-Dabbagh Group (ADG)
- Bakr bin Laden, chairman of the Saudi Binladin Group and half-brother of Osama bin Laden
- Khalid Abdullah Almolhem, former head of Saudi Arabian Airlines
- Loai Nazer, prominent businessman
- Mansour al-Balawi, prominent businessman
- Mohammed Hussein Al Amoudi, Ethio-Saudi billionaire businessman
- Nasser Al Tayyar, businessman, non-executive board member Al Tayyar Travel Group
- Saleh Abdullah Kamel, billionaire businessman, owner of Arab Radio and Television Network and founder of the Dallah al Baraka Group
- Saoud al-Daweesh, former chief executive of Saudi Telecom Company
- Waleed bin Ibrahim Al Ibrahim, billionaire businessman, brother-in-law of King Fahd, Chairman of Middle East Broadcasting Company (MBC)
- Zuhair Fayez, prominent businessman
- Walid Fitaihi, a physician with dual citizenship of Saudi Arabia and the US and master's degree in public health from Harvard University

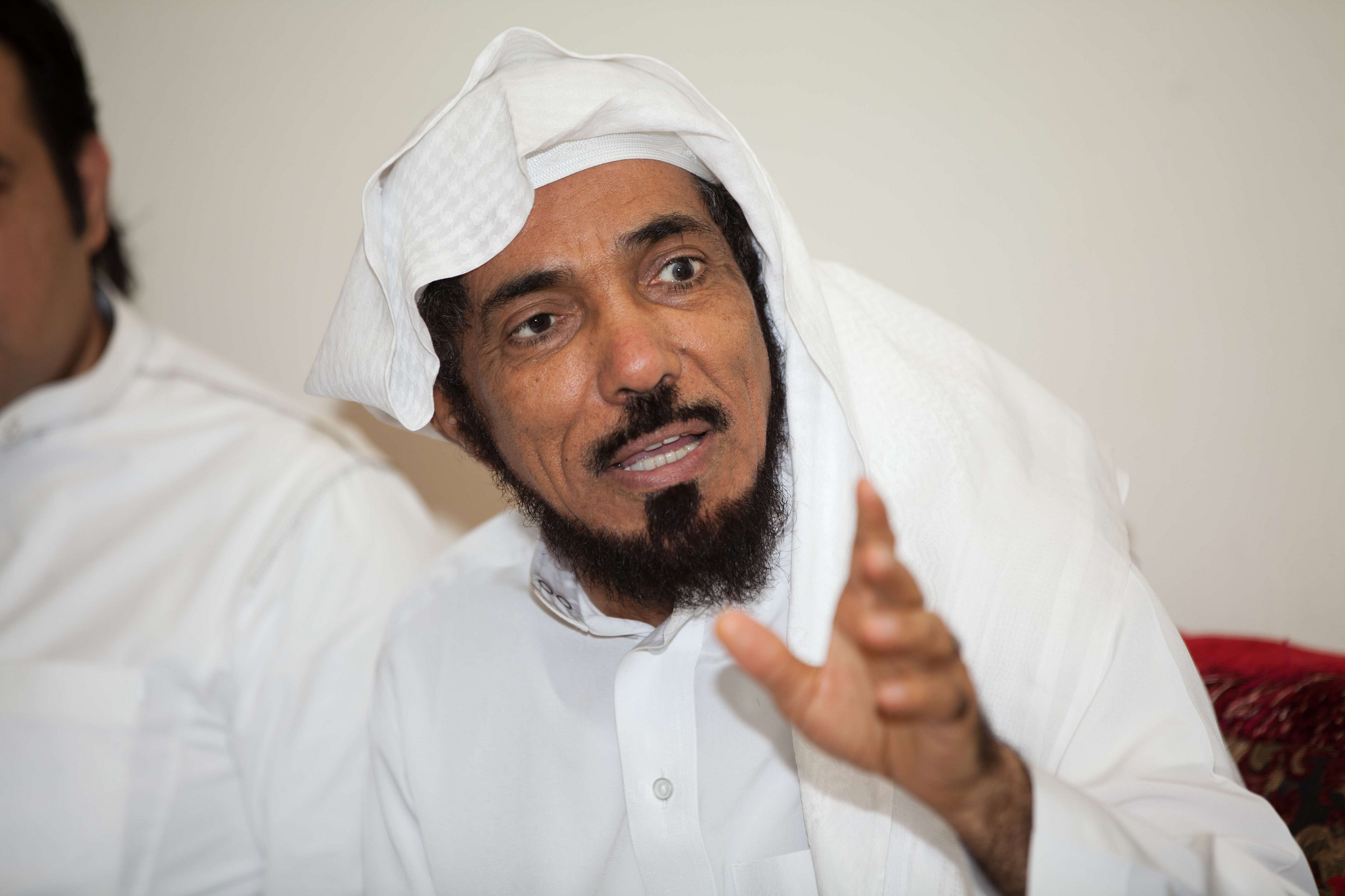
Salman al-Ouda

=== Islamic scholars and media figures ===
==== Detained ====
- Awad al-Qarni, Islamic scholar, author, and former professor
- Ali al-Omari, TV cleric and Chairman of the Mecca Open University
- Salman al-Ouda, Islamic scholar and member of the International Union of Muslim Scholars' board of trustees
- Safar al-Hawali, Islamic scholar, writer and co-founder of the Committee for the Defense of Legitimate Rights
- Ibrahim al-Sakran, Islamic scholar, writer, researcher, lawyer and thinker.

==== Uncertain status ====
- Ahmed al-Amari, Islamic scholar and Dean of the Quran College at the Islamic University of Madinah. Died in custody, however there are unconfirmed allegations he was killed.

== Reactions ==
According to Sam Blatteis, Middle East Public Policy Manager for Deloitte and a former Google head of public policy in the Persian Gulf, "This is the closest thing in the Middle East to glasnost"; other businessmen have compared the purge to Russian president Vladimir Putin's politically motivated attacks on Russian oligarchs. The Economist likened the purge to the anti-corruption campaign under Xi Jinping, General Secretary of the Chinese Communist Party. Thomas Friedman at The New York Times called it Saudi Arabia's Arab Spring.

In Saudi Arabia the purge was supported by the Council of Senior Scholars.

== Aftermath ==
The 2017 purge of the Saudi political and business elite was followed in 2018 by arrests of 17 women's rights activists, including Aziza al-Yousef, Loujain al-Hathloul, Eman al-Nafjan, Aisha al-Mana and Madeha al-Ajroush as well as Hatoon al-Fassi, a women's rights activist and associate professor of women's history. Eastern Province human rights activist Israa al-Ghomgham and her husband, already in prison since December 2015, were under legal threat of beheading along with four colleagues, with a final hearing to take place on 28 October 2018 in the Specialized Criminal Court.

On 19 November 2020, some of the Saudi detainees from the night of the Ritz-Carlton corruption purge anonymously disclosed details of the torture they endured and coercion by Saudi Arabia. The detainees claim that they were beaten and intimidated by authorities under the supervision of two ministers, who were both close confidantes of the crown prince Mohammed bin Salman who ordered the purge.

Nasser Al Qarni, the son of a prominent Saudi cleric, Awad Al-Qarni, who was arrested during the 2017 purge, was given a warning by the Saudi state security officials not to discuss the treatment of his father. Nasser was warned that doing so would lead to his imprisonment or execution. The criticism of the kingdom in Awad’s tweet led to his arrest in 2017. As a result of the threat from the state security, Nasser applied for asylum and moved to the UK.

== Committee conclusion ==
On 30 January 2019, the Saudi King Salman reviewed the final report submitted by the committee chairman stating that 381 individuals were ordered and some of them as witnesses. Settlements were made with 87 individuals resulting in the recovery of $107 billion in the form of real estate, companies, cash, and other assets. The report also stated that Saudi Arabia's Public Prosecutor rejected the settlements with 56 individuals due to already existing criminal charges against them, while eight individuals denied the settlements and were referred to the Public Prosecutor.

== See also ==
- Corruption in Saudi Arabia
- 2017 Lebanon–Saudi Arabia dispute
- 2018–2019 Saudi crackdown on feminists
- 2019 Saudi Arabia mass execution
