= Al-Balawi (surname) =

Al-Balawi (Arabic: البلوي) can refer to:

- Al-Balawī, an Egyptian historian
- Hakam Balawi, Palestinian politician
- Humam Khalil Abu-Mulal al-Balawi, Jordanian doctor and a triple agent suicide bomber
- Mansour al-Balawi, Saudi Arabian businessman
- The nisba of a member of the Arab tribe of Bali
