= Turki Alajmah =

Saudi Arabian sports broadcaster

- Born: 9th of April; Riyadh, Saudi Arabia
- Occupations: Sports broadcaster, Journalist, Media personality
- Website: http://turkialajmah.com

Turki Alajmah (Arabic: تركي العجمة; born 9 April) is a Saudi Arabian sports broadcaster and media personality.

Alajmah is known for hosting the sports program "Kora" on Rotana Khalijia and is also a member of the board of Directors of the Saudi Football Federation.

== Career ==
Alajmah joined the Arabic Al Ekhbariya Channel in the early 2000s, where he presented the first official sports bulletin. He was eventually appointed as the head of the sports department of the channel. He went on to host the program "Issues in the Middle" (Arabic: قضايا في الوسط) where he interviewed personalities in the Saudi sports community. Throughout his career, Alajamah has interviewed public figures and athletes such as Majed Abdullah, Mansour Al-Balawi, Prince Abdullah Bin Mosaad Al Saud, and Turki bin Faisal Al Saud.

Alajmah launched the sports program "Kora" (Arabic: كورة) on the Rotana Khalijia channel.

Alajmah was appointed as a member of the Board of Directors of the Saudi Football Association in 2017. He was also appointed as the head of the Sports Media Department in the Federation.

Throughout his career, Alajmah has covered sporting events such as several World Cups and high-profile football events including El Clasico, the King's Cup, and Professional League matches. Alajmah also served as a presenter during a 2018 ceremony honoring the Saudi national football team for qualifying for the World Cup.

== Awards and recognition ==
Alajmah was honored as the "Best Sports Journalist" for the Tayseer Al-Jaber Award sponsored by the King of Bahrain in 2011. Additionally, he has been recognized in multiple editions of the Gulf Festival for Radio and Television, receiving several awards, including gold awards and an honorary award for his career and achievements.
