= Khalid Abdullah Almolhem =

Saudi Arabian businessman

- Born: 1957 (age 68–69)
- Occupation: Businessman

Khalid Abdullah Almolhem (Arabic: خالد عبد الله الملحم; born 1957) is a Saudi Arabian businessman. He served as President of Saudi Telecom Company and later as Director General of Saudi Arabian Airlines. In November 2017, he was detained during Saudi Arabia's anti-corruption campaign and was released in January 2018.

== Biography ==
Khalid Abdullah Almolhem completed two degrees from the University of Evansville in Indiana in 1980; one in electrical engineering and the other in engineering management. Almolhem began his career in 1981 as an engineer with the Royal Saudi Air Force; after that he was a team leader in Saudi Industrial Fund from 1983 till 1988.

== Business career ==
Almolhem joined Saudi British Bank from 1989 to 1997, he held various positions at the bank such as Senior Manager Retail Banking, Area General Manager, Central Province Manager and Executive Director Investment Banking. He also held the Chief Executive Officer position at Al-Marai Company, one of the largest integrated dairy and food companies in the country.

He joined Saudi Telecom Company (STC) when it was established in 1998, serving as Chief Financial Officer until 2001 and then as CEO until 2006. During his tenure at STC, he successfully completed the privatization process of the company, which is the largest IPO in Saudi Arabian history. STC now considered to be as the largest Telecom company in the Middle East and one of the tenth largest Telecom companies in the world.

Following his time as president of Saudi Telecom Company, Almolhem was appointed as Director General of Saudia, one of the biggest carriers in the Middle East and the flag carrier in Saudi Arabia. During his tenure, he has carried the airline through the privatisation process and oversaw a significant leap in performance and service quality. He was behind the historic moment when Saudia joined the SkyTeam alliance of airlines, Saudia is the alliance’s first member from the Middle East and will offer access to destinations that were not previously available to SkyTeam customers.

He attended numerous training courses, including a full year training course in banking and credit at Chase Manhattan Bank in 1984; Advanced Management Course for Executives at Harvard University; and various training courses in management and marketing from international universities.

- Board Member of the Saudi British Bank from May 1996 till to date
- Vice Chairman Board of Directors of Riyadh Cement Company till to date
- Board Member of the National Company for Cooperative Insurance from 2000 to 2003
- Board Member of HSBC Investment Bank since 2004 till 2007
- Board Member of the Aseer Holding Company since 2006 till 2010
- Board Member of King Abdullah Economic City
- Chairman of Saudia Catering
- Chairman of Saudia Cargo
- Chairman of Saudia Ground Handling Services
- Chairman of the Board of SAB Invest

== Arrest ==
On 4 November 2017, Khalid Abdullah Almolhem was arrested in Saudi Arabia in a "corruption crackdown" conducted by a new royal anti-corruption committee. This was done on authority of Crown Prince Mohammad Bin Salman. He was among 11 princes, senior government officials and businessmen detained in the campaign. Almolhem was released in January 2018 after more than two months in detention. The terms of his release and allegations he faced were not publicly known.
