= Abdullah bin Sultan bin Mohammed Al-Sultan =

Saudi Arabian military officer

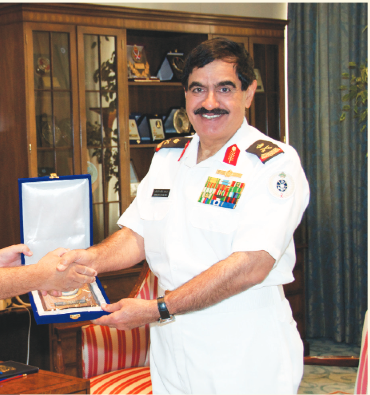
- Allegiance: Saudi Arabia
- Branch: Royal Saudi Navy
- Service years: –2017
- Rank: Admiral

Admiral Abdullah al-Sultan was a Saudi Arabian military officer and formerly commander of the Royal Saudi Navy who was succeeded by Fahad al-Ghafli.

== Biography ==
Admiral al-Sultan was appointed commander of the Royal Saudi Navy in May 2014 during a reshuffle in the senior command of the armed forces. He is from southern Saudi Arabia and his selection was in part to oversee potential operations in that strategic direction, which included Yemen.

During the 2017 Saudi Arabian purge, on 4 November 2017, Abdullah bin Sultan bin Mohammed Al-Sultan was ordered to step down, and replaced by Fahad al-Ghafli. This was following a "corruption crackdown" conducted by a new royal anti-corruption committee. The order came from Crown Prince Mohammad bin Salman.
