= Mohammed bin Salman =

Crown Prince of Saudi Arabia since 2017

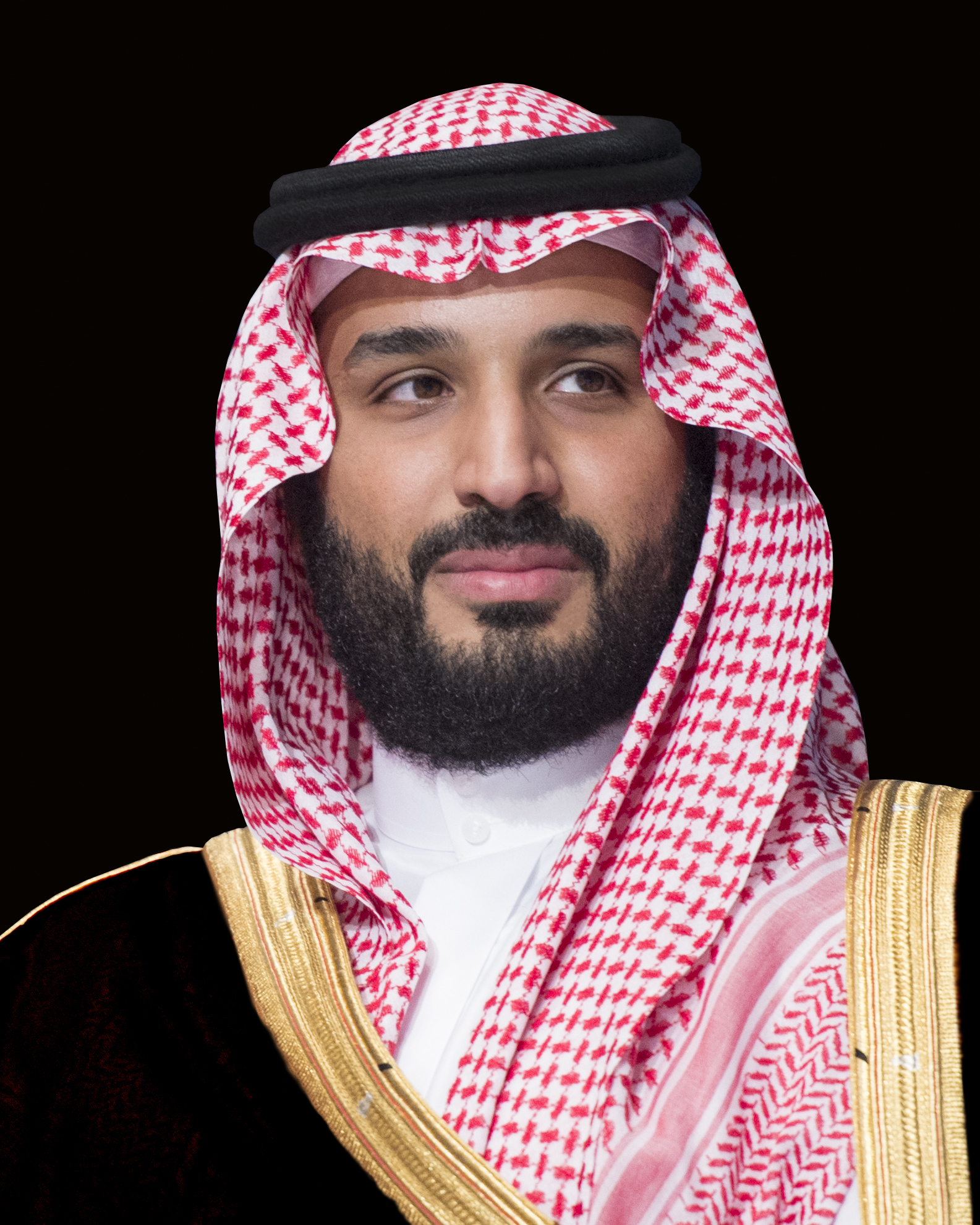
- Official portrait, 2016

Crown Prince of Saudi Arabia
- Incumbent
- Assumed office 21 June 2017
- Monarch: Salman
- Preceded by: Muhammad bin Nayef

Prime Minister of Saudi Arabia
- Incumbent
- Assumed office 27 September 2022
- Monarch: Salman
- Preceded by: King Salman

First Deputy Prime Minister of Saudi Arabia
- In office 21 June 2017 – 27 September 2022
- Monarch: Salman
- Prime Minister: King Salman
- Preceded by: Muhammad bin Nayef

Deputy Crown Prince of Saudi Arabia; Second Deputy Prime Minister
- In office 29 April 2015 – 21 June 2017
- Monarch: Salman
- Prime Minister: King Salman
- Deputy: Muhammad bin Nayef
- Preceded by: Muhammad bin Nayef

Minister of Defense
- In office 23 January 2015 – 27 September 2022
- Monarch: Salman
- Prime Minister: King Salman
- Preceded by: Salman bin Abdulaziz
- Succeeded by: Khalid bin Salman
- Born: 31 August 1985 (age 41); Riyadh, Saudi Arabia
- Spouse: Sara bint Mashour Al Saud (m. 2008)
- Issue: 5
Names
- Mohammed bin Salman bin Abdulaziz bin Abdul Rahman Al Saud
- House: Al Saud
- Father: Salman of Saudi Arabia
- Mother: Fahda bint Falah Al Hithlain
- Religion: Sunni Islam
- Education: King Saud University

Mohammed bin Salman Al Saud (Note: Arabic: مُحَمَّد بِن سَلْمَان آل سُعُود, romanised: Muḥammad bin Salmān Āl Suʿūd) (born 31 August 1985), also known as MbS, is the de facto ruler of the Kingdom of Saudi Arabia, formally serving as Crown Prince and Prime Minister. He is the heir apparent to the Saudi throne, the son of King Salman, and a grandson of the nation's founder, Ibn Saud.

Mohammed is the first child of King Salman bin Abdulaziz and his third wife, Fahda bint Falah Al Hithlain. After obtaining a law degree from King Saud University, he became an advisor to his father in 2009. He was appointed deputy crown prince and defence minister after his father became king in 2015, then promoted to crown prince in 2017. Mohammed succeeded his father as prime minister in 2022.

Since his appointment as crown prince in 2017, Mohammed has introduced a series of liberal social and economic reforms; these include curtailing the influence of the Wahhabi religious establishment by restricting the powers of the religious police and improving women's rights, removing the ban on female drivers in 2018, and weakening the male-guardianship system in 2019. However, his government has continued to imprison women's rights activists on terrorism charges. His Saudi Vision 2030 programme aims to reduce the Saudi economy's reliance on oil through investment in other sectors such as technology, tourism, sport, and the failed megaproject Neom; the economy remains heavily reliant on oil.

Under Mohammed, Saudi Arabia has pursued a foreign policy aimed at increasing the country's regional and international influence and attracting greater foreign investment. The Kingdom has coordinated energy policy with Russia, strengthened its relations with China, became a major non-NATO ally of the United States, and expanded diplomatic and commercial relations with emerging economies and regional powers in Africa, South America, and Asia. Mohammed was the architect of the Saudi-led intervention in Yemen and was involved in the escalation of the Qatar diplomatic crisis, as well as a 2018 diplomatic dispute with Canada, in addition to being a key instigator of the 2026 Iran war.

Mohammed leads an authoritarian government. Those regarded as political dissidents are systematically repressed through methods including imprisonment, torture, and executions, including for online criticism. Between 2017 and 2019, he led the purge of competing Saudi political and economic elites on an anti-corruption platform, seizing up to US$800 billion in assets and cash and cementing control over Saudi politics. A 2021 report by the United States Office of the Director of National Intelligence (ODNI) found that Mohammed had ordered the assassination of journalist Jamal Khashoggi.

== Early life, education and career ==
Mohammed bin Salman was born on 31 August 1985, the son of Prince Salman bin Abdulaziz and his third wife, Fahda bint Falah Al Hithlain. He is the eldest of his mother's six children and the eighth child and seventh son of his father. His full siblings include Prince Turki and Defense Minister Prince Khalid. Mohammed holds a bachelor's degree in law from King Saud University, where he graduated second in his class.

=== Early career ===
After graduating from university, Mohammed spent several years in the private sector before becoming an aide to his father. He worked as a consultant for the Experts Commission, working for the Saudi Cabinet. On 15 December 2009, at the age of 24, he entered politics as a special advisor to his father when the latter was the governor of Riyadh Province. At this time, Mohammed began to move from one position to another, such as secretary-general of the Riyadh Competitive Council, special advisor to the chairman of the board for the King Abdulaziz Foundation for Research and Archives, and a member of the board of trustees for Albir Society in the Riyadh region. In October 2011, Crown Prince Sultan bin Abdulaziz died. Prince Salman began his ascent to power by becoming second deputy prime minister and minister of defence. He made Mohammed his private advisor.

==== Chief of the Court ====
In June 2012, Crown Prince Nayef bin Abdulaziz died. Mohammed moved up into the number two position in the hierarchy, as his father became the new crown prince and first deputy prime minister. On 2 March 2013, Chief of the Crown Prince Court Saud bin Nayef Al Saud was appointed governor of the Eastern Province, and Mohammed succeeded him as chief of the court. He was also given the rank of minister. On 25 April 2014, Mohammed was appointed state minister.

== Rise to power ==
=== Minister of Defence ===
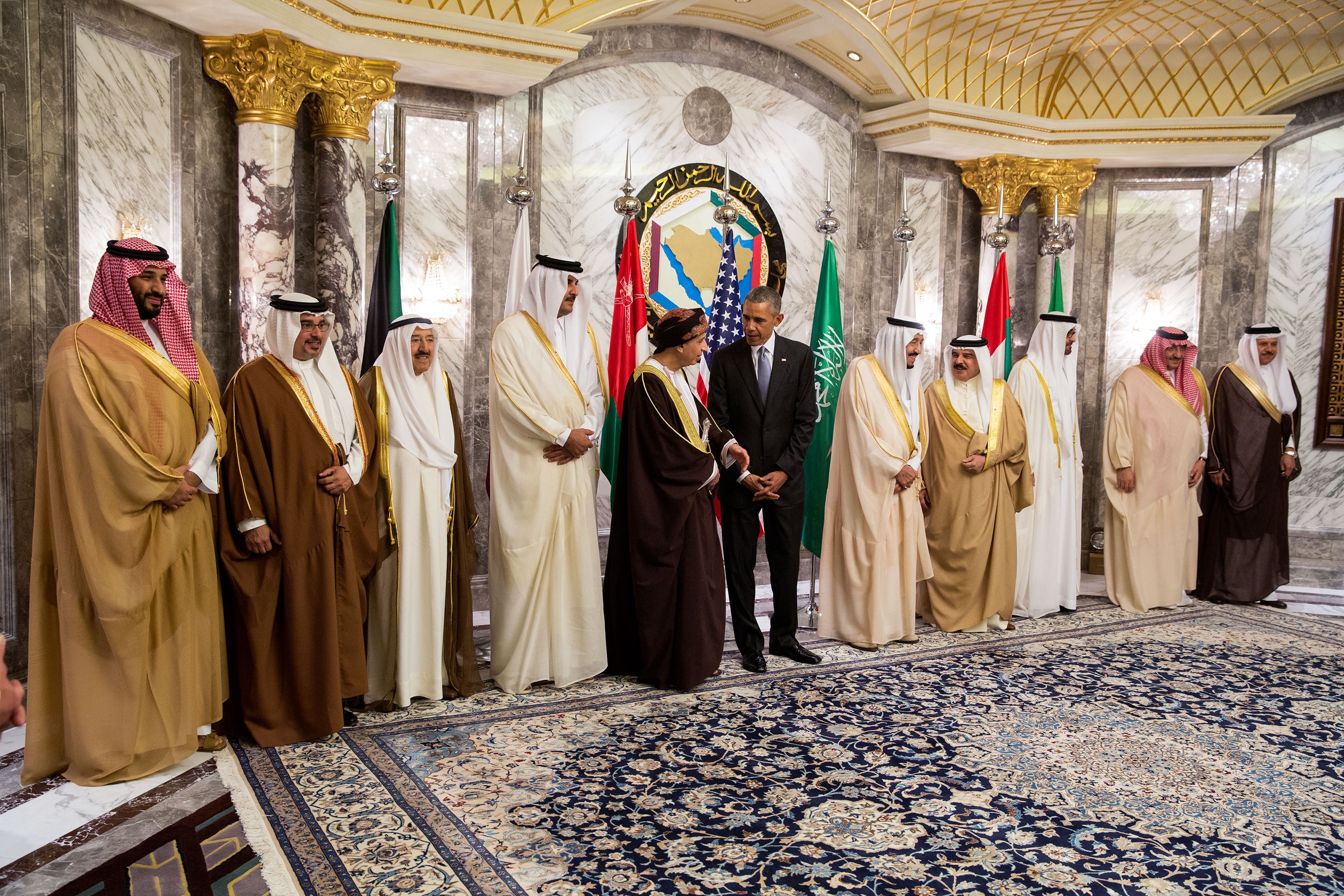
Mohammed with King Salman, U.S. president Barack Obama and other leaders at the GCC summit in Saudi Arabia on 21 April 2016

On 23 January 2015, King Abdullah died and Salman ascended the throne. Mohammed was appointed minister of defence and secretary general of the royal court. In addition, he retained his post as the minister of state.

The political unrest in Yemen (which began escalating in 2011) rapidly became a major issue for the newly appointed minister of defence, with Houthis taking control of northern Yemen in late 2014, followed by the resignation of President Abdrabbuh Mansur Hadi and his cabinet. Mohammed's first move as minister was to mobilise a pan-GCC coalition to intervene following a series of suicide bombings in the Yemeni capital Sana'a via air strikes against Houthis, and impose a naval blockade. In March 2015, Saudi Arabia began leading a coalition of countries allied against the Houthi rebels. While there was agreement among those Saudi princes heading security services regarding the necessity of a response to the Houthis' seizure of Sana'a, which had forced the Yemeni government into exile, Mohammed launched the intervention without full coordination across security services. Saudi National Guard minister Mutaib bin Abdullah Al Saud, who was out of the country, was left out of the loop of operations. While Mohammed saw the war as a quick win on Houthi rebels in Yemen and a way to put President Hadi back in power, it became a long war of attrition.

In April 2015, King Salman appointed his nephew Muhammad bin Nayef as crown prince and his son Mohammed as deputy crown prince. In late 2015, at a meeting between his father and Barack Obama, Mohammed bin Salman broke protocol to deliver a monologue criticising US foreign policy. When he announced an anti-terrorist military alliance of Islamic countries in December 2015, some countries involved said they had not been consulted.

Regarding his role in the military intervention, Mohammed gave his first on-the-record interview on 4 January 2016 to The Economist, which had called him the "architect of the war in Yemen". Denying the title, he explained the mechanism of the decision-making institutions actually holding stakes in the intervention, including the council of security and political affairs and the ministry of foreign affairs from the Saudi side. He added that the Houthis usurped power in Sana'a before he was minister of defence.

In response to the threat from ISIL, Mohammed established the Islamic Military Counter Terrorism Coalition (IMCTC), a Saudi-led Islamic alliance against terrorism, in December 2015. The IMCTC's first meeting took place in Riyadh in November 2017 and involved defence ministers and officials from 41 countries.

=== Crown prince ===
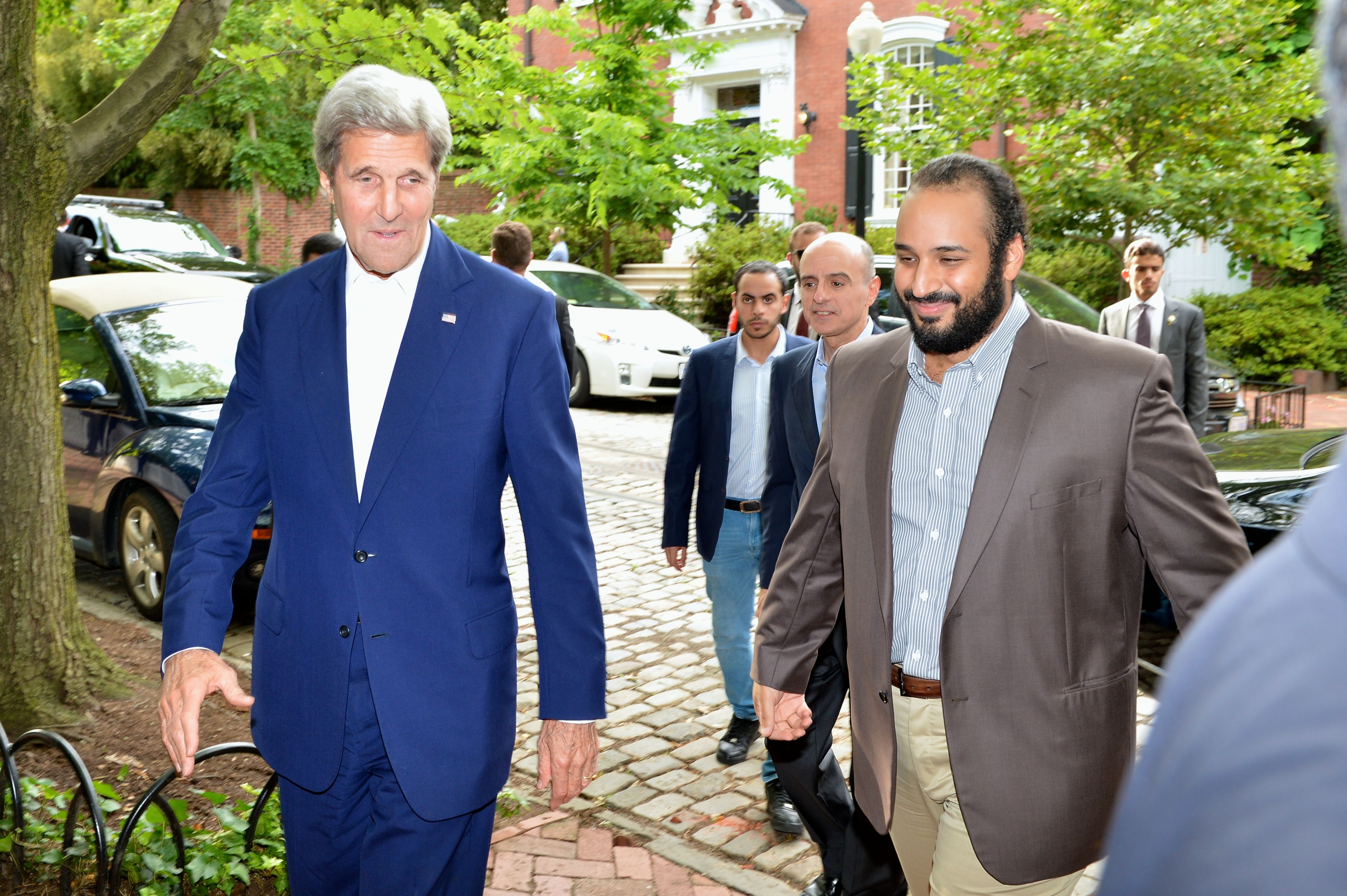
With US secretary of state John Kerry (left) and Saudi foreign minister Adel al-Jubeir, 13 June 2016. This is one of the few images of MBS without the shemagh being worn.

Mohammed was appointed crown prince on 21 June 2017, following the King's decision to depose Muhammad bin Nayef and make his own son the heir to the throne. The change of succession had been predicted in December 2015 by a public memo published by the German Federal Intelligence Service, which was subsequently rebuked by the German government.

On the day bin Salman became crown prince, US president Donald Trump called to congratulate him. Trump and Mohammed pledged "close cooperation" on security and economic issues and discussed the need to cut off support for terrorism, the diplomatic dispute with Qatar, and the push for peace between Israel and the Palestinians. Mohammed told The Washington Post in April 2017 that without America's cultural influence on Saudi Arabia, "we would have ended up like North Korea."

=== 2017 purge ===
In May 2017, Mohammed launched a purge against competing Saudi business and political elites in an anti-corruption campaign. He said, "no one will survive in a corruption case—whoever he is, even if he's a prince or a minister". In November 2017, he ordered some 200 wealthy businessmen and princes to be placed under house arrest in The Ritz-Carlton, Riyadh. On 4 November 2017, the Saudi press announced the arrest of the Saudi prince and billionaire Al-Waleed bin Talal, a frequent English-language news commentator and a major shareholder in Citi, News Corp and Twitter, as well as over 40 princes and government ministers on corruption and money laundering charges. Others arrested or fired in the purge included Prince Mutaib bin Abdullah, head of the Saudi Arabian National Guard; Minister of Economy and Planning Adel Fakeih; and the commander of the Royal Saudi Navy, Admiral Abdullah bin Sultan bin Mohammed Al-Sultan.

Those arrested in the Ritz Carlton were the subject of what became called "the night of beating". Most were beaten, and some were tied to walls in stress positions as part of torture by Saudi agents. The interrogators knew very little outside of the victims' assets within Saudi Arabia and wanted to know more about their off-shore holdings, while the victims did not know why they were detained. The detainees were threatened with blackmail. At one point, the interrogators told the victims to contact their bank managers in Geneva and elsewhere and ask for large sums of money, and were surprised due to their inexpertise that the assets were not entirely in cash. Swiss banks identified some of the transactions as under duress and were able to stop some of them. During the proceedings, there was no due process nor plea bargains. US officials described the actions as "coercion, abuse, and torture". Detainees were denied sleep, had their heads covered, and were beaten. Seventeen had to be hospitalised. After many days, the remaining detainees were moved to Al-Ha'ir Prison, while some released are banned from travelling abroad.

The purge helped centralise political powers in the hands of bin Salman and undermine the pre-existing structure of consensus-based governance among Saudi elites. The arrests resulted in the final sidelining of the faction of King Abdullah, and bin Salman's consolidation of control of all three branches of the security forces. It also cemented bin Salman's supremacy over business elites in Saudi Arabia and resulted in a mass seizure of assets by the bin Salman regime.

Trump expressed support for the move, tweeting "Some of those they are harshly treating have been 'milking' their country for years!" French president Emmanuel Macron, who visited Riyadh days after the purge, offered no comment, saying "this is not the role of a president, and similarly I would not expect a leader of a foreign country to come and infringe on domestic matters."

On 30 January 2019, the Anti-Corruption Committee's work was declared complete. As many as 500 people were rounded up in the sweep. Saudi Arabian banks froze more than 2,000 domestic accounts as part of the crackdown. According to The Wall Street Journal, the Saudi government targeted cash and assets worth up to $800 billion. The Saudi authorities claimed that amount was composed of assets worth around $300 billion to $400 billion that they can prove was linked to corruption.

=== Prime Minister ===
On 27 September 2022, Mohammed was appointed as Prime Minister of Saudi Arabia by King Salman. Traditionally, the king has held the title of prime minister.

== Administration ==
=== Ideology ===
Mohammed's ideology has been described as nationalist and populist, with conservative attitudes towards politics, and a liberal stance on economic and social issues. It has been heavily influenced by the views of his former adviser Saud al-Qahtani and the ruler of Abu Dhabi, Mohammed bin Zayed. His style of ruling has been described as extremely brutal by journalist Rula Jebreal and authoritarian by Jamal Khashoggi and Theodor Winkler. Mohammed bin Salman has also been championing an Arab nationalist ideology domestically and through foreign policy; with a focus on opposing Islamist movements.

=== Authoritarianism ===
Mohammed heads a repressive authoritarian government in Saudi Arabia. Human rights activists and women's rights activists in Saudi Arabia have faced abuse and torture by the regime. Critics, journalists and former insiders are tortured and killed. The government has targeted Saudi dissidents who are located abroad. Jamal Khashoggi, a columnist of The Washington Post, was murdered by the regime. Mohammed has justified the mass arrests of human rights activists as being as necessary for enacting reforms in Saudi Arabia and for establishing a state based on Arab nationalism.

Mohammed has increasingly consolidated power in Saudi Arabia during his tenure as leader. He significantly restricted the powers of the Saudi religious police. On 29 January 2015, Mohammed was named the chair of the newly established Council for Economic and Development Affairs, replacing the disbanded Supreme Economic Commission. In April 2015, Mohammed was given control over Saudi Aramco by royal decree following his appointment as deputy crown prince.

== Domestic policies ==
=== Religious policy ===
According to David Ottaway of the Wilson Center, "[o]f all [Mohammed's] domestic reforms", the most "consequential" has been his work limiting the influence of Saudi Wahhabi clergy, "who still command millions of followers in the country and beyond". Mohammed's inviting of "a constant stream of Western male and female singers, bands, dancers and even American female wrestlers" to perform in Saudi Arabia is in complete conflict with religious conservatives who have spoken "against the opening up of the kingdom to secular Western culture". Under Mohammed, the Saudi government has promoted a new Saudi identity and nationalist history that downplays religious heritage and restricts Islamic influence in the cultural sphere. Journalist Graeme Wood writes, "it is hard to exaggerate how drastically this sidelining of Islamic law will change Saudi Arabia." Gabriella Perez argues that the new social changes implemented by Mohammed are oriented towards secularist repression, with the potential to adversely impact freedom of religion in the country.

==== Restrictions on religious police ====
In 2016, Mohammed took steps to drastically curtail the powers of the "Committee for the Promotion of Virtue and the Prevention of Vice" (CPVPV), or Islamic religious police. The "feared" CPVPV, which had thousands of officers on the streets and powers to arrest, detain, and interrogate those suspected of violating sharia, was banned "from pursuing, questioning, asking for identification, arresting and detaining anyone suspected of a crime". The cinema industry was reinstated, social liberties were expanded, gender mixing and dating have been normalised by the state in the public sphere. Schmidt-Feuerheerd argues that the new state policies are also accompanied by an increasing clampdown on political and religious activities independent of the government.

==== Changes to legal system ====
Mohammed has stated that "in Islamic law, the head of the Islamic establishment is wali al-amr (Arabic: وَلِيّ الأمر ), the ruler. While Saudi rulers "have historically stayed away from religion", and "outsourced" issues of theology and religious law to "the big beards", traditionally conservative and orthodox religious scholars, Mohammed has "a law degree from King Saud University" and "flaunts his knowledge and dominance over the clerics", according to Graeme Wood. He is "probably the only leader in the Arab world who knows anything about Islamic epistemology and jurisprudence", according to American historian Professor Bernard Haykel. In an interview televised in Saudi Arabia on 25 April 2021, Mohammed criticised the devotion of Saudi religious leaders to Wahhabi doctrines "in language never before used by a Saudi monarch", saying "there are no fixed schools of thought and there is no infallible person", and that fatwas "should be based on the time, place and mindset in which they are issued", rather than regarded as immutable.

As of early 2021, Mohammed has "ordered a codification of Saudi laws that would end the power of individual Wahhabi judges to implement" their own interpretation of Sharia. According to Wood, many conservative clerics strongly appear to have succumbed to "good old-fashioned intimidation" by the government to reverse their religious positions and supporting the government line on issues such as "the opening of cinemas and mass layoffs of Wahhabi imams".

==== Abaya ban ====
In December 2022, Saudi Arabia's Education and Training Evaluation Commission (ETEC) declared a governmental ban on Muslim female students from wearing the traditional abaya clothing to examination centres, insisting that students should wear only school uniforms. A later clarification from ETEC reported by The Milli Chronicle stated that the ban on abayas was restricted only for all-female examination centres run by the ETEC.

=== Economic policy ===
==== Vision 2030 ====
Mohammed took the leadership in the restructuring of Saudi Arabia's economy, which he officially announced in April 2016 when he introduced Vision 2030, the country's strategic orientation for the next 15 years. Vision 2030 plans to reform Saudi Arabia's economy towards a more diversified and privatised structure.

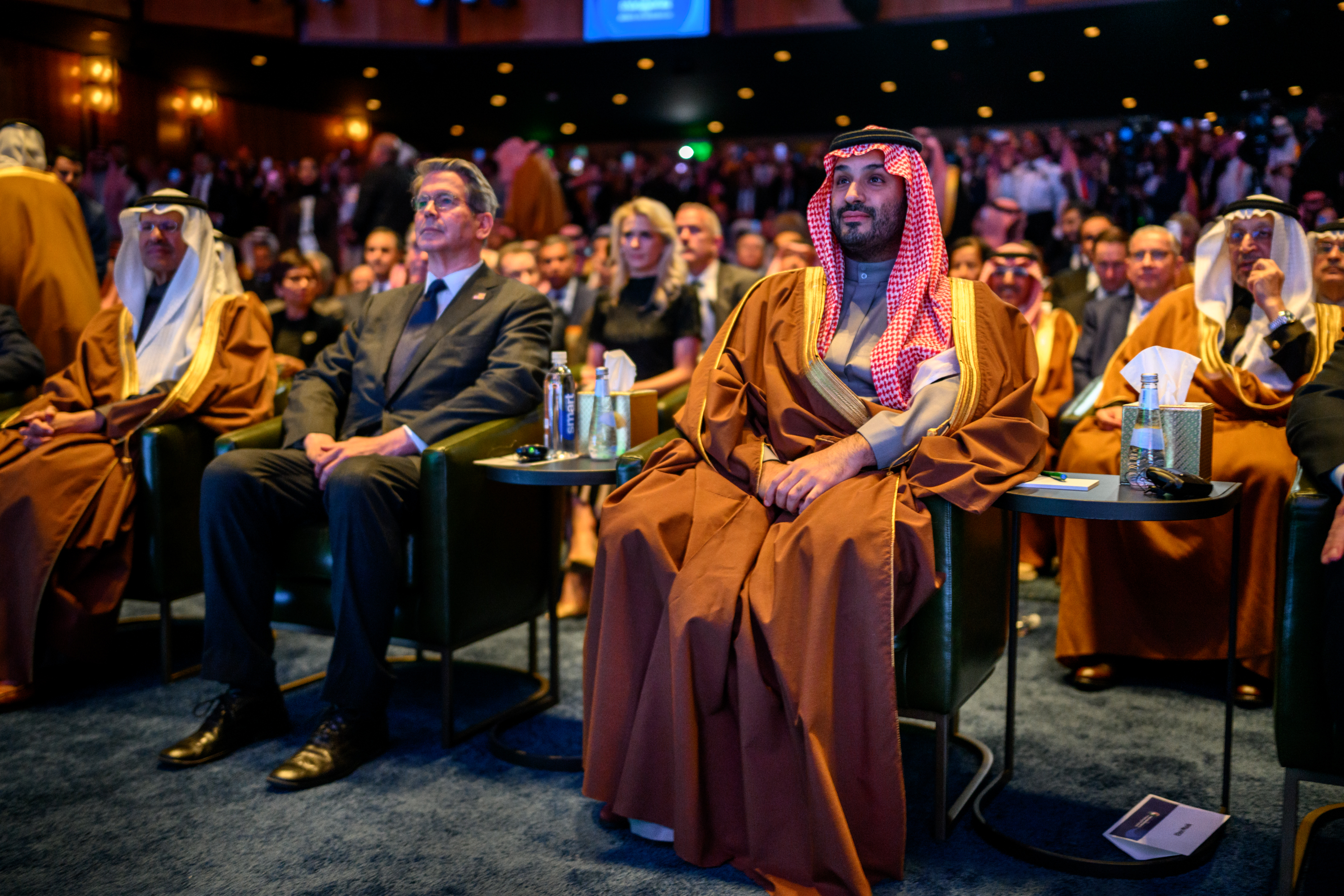
Mohammed at the U.S.-Saudi Investment Forum in Washington, D.C. on 19 November 2025

In October 2017, Mohammed announced plans for the creation of Neom, a linear city powered by renewable energy sources, covering an area of 26,000 square kilometres on Saudi Arabia's Red Sea coast, extending into Jordan and Egypt. Bin Salman's project was widely criticised as unrealistic. Neom's construction entailed substantial environmental harm and human rights violations, with expatriate employees describing abusive working conditions and members of the local Howeitat tribe protesting against their forced expulsion. In 2024, the project was reported to have been substantially scaled back from its original plan. An internal audit of the megaproject found extensive problems, including "evidence of deliberate manipulation", by the managers of the project. By 2025, new contracts for Neom dried up and there was no mention of Neom in Saudi Arabia's pre-budget statement for 2026.

The Neom announcement followed plans to develop a 34,000 square kilometre area across a lagoon of 50 islands on Saudi Arabia's Red Sea coastline into a luxury tourism destination with laws on a par with international standards. In a further effort to boost the tourism industry, in November 2017 it was announced that Saudi Arabia would start issuing tourist visas for foreigners, beginning in 2018.

In the last week of September 2018, Mohammed inaugurated the much-awaited $6.7bn high-speed railway line connecting Mecca and Medina, the two holiest cities of Islam. The Haramain Express is 450 km line travelling up to 300 km/h that can transport around 60 million passengers annually. The commercial operations of the railway began on 11 October 2018.

==== Saudi petroleum industry ====
Saudi Arabia, OPEC's largest producer, has the second-largest amount of oil reserves in the world. On 28 September 2021, Joe Biden's national security adviser, Jake Sullivan, met with Mohammed in Saudi Arabia to discuss the high oil prices. In October 2022 in protest of Saudi Arabia cutting oil production, US National Security Council spokesman John Kirby said Saudi Arabia knew the cut would "increase Russian revenues and blunt the effectiveness of sanctions" and accused Saudi Arabia of "coercing" other oil producing countries to agree. The record-high energy prices were driven by a global surge in demand as the world quit the economic recession caused by COVID-19, particularly due to strong energy demand in Asia.

The relations between Russia and Saudi Arabia evolved under Mohammed, granting the two nations the ability to coordinate in oil export decisions.

==== Sport sector ====
Mohammed has presided over unprecedented spending on sport since becoming Saudi Arabia's de facto ruler in 2017. He has also been assiduous in striking deals to bring top sports events to Saudi, including the FIFA Club World Cup in 2034 and the Asian Games in 2029. In 2023, Mohammed said this approach is central to the country's goal of becoming one of the world's top 10 tourist destinations, stating: "When you want to diversify an economy you have to work in all sectors: mining, infrastructure, manufacturing, transportation, logistics all this… Part of it is tourism and if you want to develop tourism part of it is culture, part of it is your sport sector, because you need to create a calendar."

=== Domestic reforms ===
Mohammed established an entertainment authority that began hosting comedy shows, professional wrestling events, and monster truck rallies. In 2016, he shared his idea for "Green cards" for non-Saudi foreigners with Al Arabiya journalist Turki Aldakhil. In 2019 the Saudi cabinet approved a new residency scheme (Premium Residency) for foreigners. The scheme will enable expatriates to permanently reside, own property and invest in the Kingdom.

The first measures undertaken in April 2016 included new taxes and cuts in subsidies, a diversification plan, the creation of a $2 trillion Saudi sovereign wealth fund, and a series of strategic economic reforms called the National Transformation Programme. Mohammed's plans to raise capital for the sovereign wealth fund included selling off shares of Saudi Aramco, the state-owned petroleum and natural gas company, with the capital to be re-invested in other sectors such as to implement the diversification plans. In October 2017, the plan for Aramco's IPO listing was criticised by The Economist, which called it "a mess". Mohammed slashed the state budget, freezing government contracts and reducing the pay of civil employees as part of drastic austerity measures.

In April 2017, Mohammed announced a project to build one of the world's largest cultural, sports and entertainment cities in Qiddiya City, southwest of Riyadh. The plans for a 334-square kilometre city include a safari and a Six Flags Qiddiya City theme park.

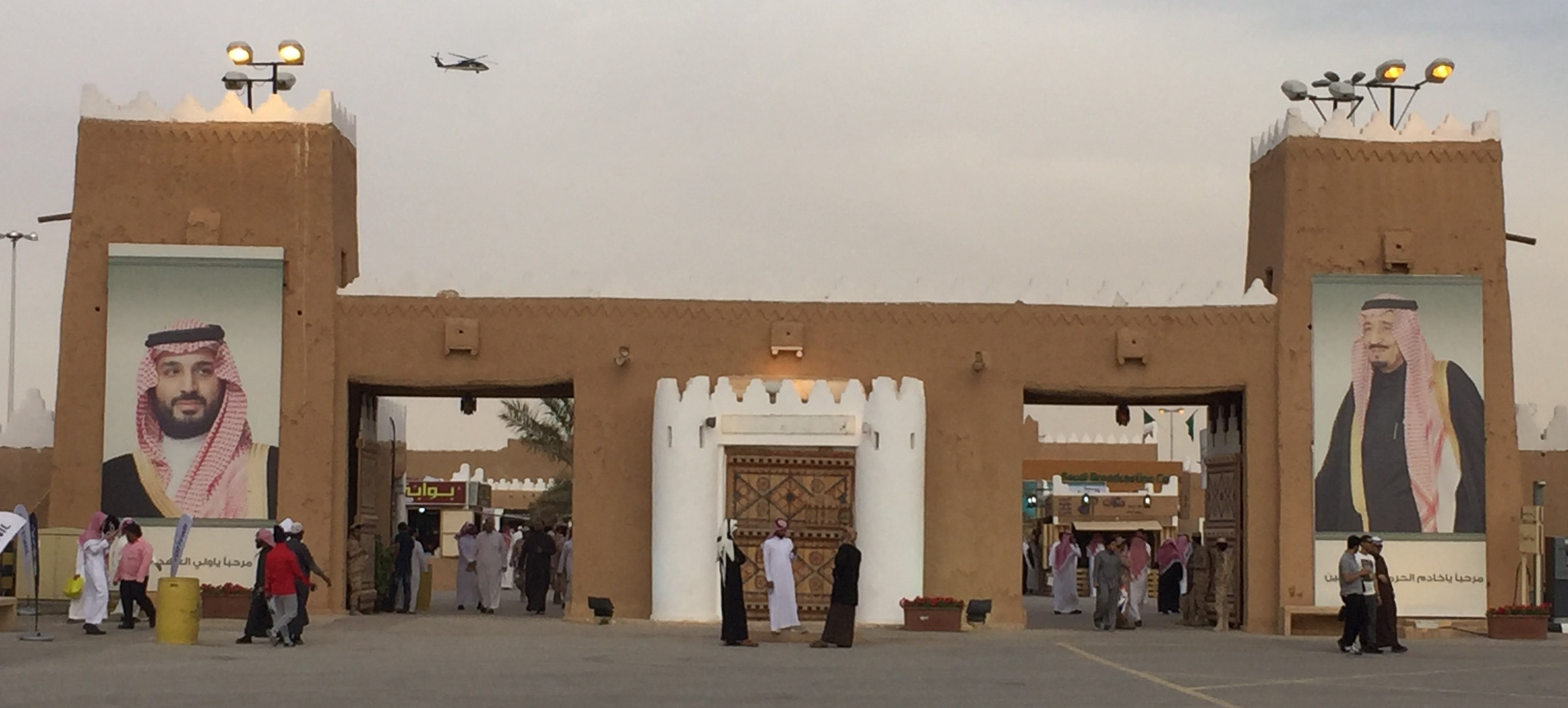
Portraits of King Salman and Prince Mohammed at the Jenadriyah festival

In October 2017, Mohammed said that the ultra-conservative Saudi state had not been "normal" for the past 30 years, blaming rigid doctrines that had governed society in a reaction to the Iranian Revolution, which successive leaders "didn't know how to deal with". He stated that he aimed to have Saudi Arabia start "returning to what we were before—a country of moderate Islam that is open to all religions and to the world". This amounted to telling the country's clerics that the deal the royal family struck with them after the Grand Mosque seizure was to be renegotiated. Building an industrial culture was seen as incompatible with Wahhabism. The Wahhabis were committed to fixed social and gender relationships. These were consistent with an economy built on oil sales, but industrialisation requires a dynamic culture with social relations constantly shifting. The regime's commitment to "moderate Islam" and secularisation drive through repressive methods has been questioned.

Further cultural transformations followed in December 2017 with Saudi Arabia's first public concert by a female singer, and in January 2018 a sports stadium in Jeddah became the first in the Kingdom to admit women. In April 2018, the first public cinema opened in Saudi Arabia after a ban of 35 years, with plans to have more than 2,000 screens running by 2030.

In an interview with a CBS 60 Minutes that aired on 29 September 2019, Mohammed invited people to visit the kingdom to see the transformation, asking for people to meet Saudi citizens for themselves.

On 26 April 2020, the Supreme Judicial Council of Saudi Arabia abolished flogging as a punishment in the country, stating that the decision was "an extension of the human rights reforms introduced under the direction of King Salman and the direct supervision of Crown Prince Mohammed bin Salman". The following day, the Human Rights Commission of Saudi Arabia reported the enactment of a royal decree abolishing the death penalty for crimes committed by minors.

=== Human rights ===
Early in his leadership tenure, Mohammed sought to cultivate an image of Saudi Arabia as implementing various reforms. Human rights groups say that repression has worsened under his tenure. According to human rights groups, arrests of human rights activists have risen under Mohammed. He has reportedly created the Tiger Squad, a team of assassins that act as a death squad, to target Saudi critics inside and outside Saudi Arabia. Among those detained in a wave of arrests in September 2017 were Abdulaziz al-Shubaily, a founding member of the Saudi Civil and Political Rights Association (ACPRA); Mustafa al-Hassan, an academic and novelist; and Essam al-Zamel, an entrepreneur. Ahead of the lifting of the ban on women driving in June 2018, 17 women's rights activists were arrested, including the women to drive and anti-male guardianship campaigner Loujain al-Hathloul. Eight of the 17 were subsequently released. Hatoon al-Fassi, an associate professor of women's history at King Saud University, was arrested shortly afterwards.

In August that year, the human rights activist Israa al-Ghomgham and her husband, both arrested in 2015, were put under legal threat of beheading. Human Rights Watch warned that the al-Ghomgham case set a "dangerous precedent" for other women activists currently detained. HRW's Middle East director Sarah Leah Whitson said, "Any execution is appalling, but seeking the death penalty for activists like Israa al-Ghomgham, who are not even accused of violent behaviour, is monstrous. Every day, the Saudi monarchy's unrestrained despotism makes it harder for its public relations teams to spin the fairy tale of 'reform' to allies and international business." On 23 April 2019, 37 people, mostly Shia human rights activists involved in the Qatif conflict, were executed in one of the largest mass executions of the minority sect in the kingdom's history.

In August 2019, Loujain al-Hathloul's brother Walid informed the media that his sister was offered release on the condition that she deny the human rights abuses committed against her in Saudi prison. Walid wrote on Twitter that the Saudi state security laid a proposal for Loujain to sign a document and appear on camera to deny that she had been tortured and sexually harassed in jail. He stated that Loujain mentioned to the family that she had been whipped, beaten, electrocuted in a chair, and harassed by masked men, who would wake her up in the middle of the night to shout threats at her in cell. Walid also tweeted that Loujain refused the offer proposed by Saudi authorities and "immediately ripped the document".

In response to foreign criticism and women's rights activism, Mohammed has implemented modest reforms to improve women's rights in Saudi Arabia. In September 2017, he implemented the women to drive movement's multi-decade demand to lift the ban on female drivers. He legislated against some elements of Saudi Arabia's Wali system, also a topic of a decades-long campaign by women's rights activists. In response to the Saudi anti male-guardianship campaign, the Saudi government enacted a law that allows women above 21 years old to obtain passports and travel abroad without needing the permission of their male guardians. In February 2018, it became legally possible for Saudi women to open their own business without a male's permission. According to the Saudi Information Ministry, as of March 2018, mothers in Saudi Arabia became authorised to retain immediate custody of their children after divorce without having to file any lawsuits.

In February 2017, Saudi Arabia appointed its first woman to head the Saudi Stock Exchange.

==== Arrest of Muhammad bin Nayef ====
Muhammad bin Nayef was arrested on 6 March 2020, along with his half-brother Nawwaf bin Nayef and King Salman's brother Ahmed bin Abdulaziz. The three princes were charged with treason. The Saudi government claimed the princes were trying to overthrow Mohammed bin Salman.

==== Accusations of poisoning attempt against King Abdullah ====
In 2021, the former Saudi intelligence official Saad al-Jabri said in an interview with CBS that Mohammed bin Salman mentioned to Interior Minister Muhammad bin Nayef Al Saud plans to kill King Abdullah in 2014. This would allow Mohammed's father to take the throne. Al-Jabri has called Mohammed "a psychopath, killer ... with infinite resources, who poses threat to his people, to the Americans and to the planet". Mohammed has rejected all allegations; the Saudi embassy called al-Jabri "a discredited former government official with a long history of [fabrication]".

== Foreign policy ==
=== Interventions in Syria and Yemen ===
Some have called Mohammed the architect of the war in Yemen. On 10 January 2016, The Independent reported that "the BND, the German intelligence agency, portrayed...Saudi defence minister and Deputy Crown Prince Mohammed bin Salman...as a political gambler who is destabilising the Arab world through proxy wars in Yemen and Syria." German officials reacted to the BND's memo, saying the published statement "is not the position of the federal government".

Mohammed leads the Saudi-led intervention in Yemen against the Houthi rebels, who in 2015 seized Sana'a and ousted the Saudi-backed Hadi government, ending multilateral efforts towards a political settlement following the 2011 Yemeni uprising. Coalition airstrikes during the intervention have resulted in thousands of civilians killed or injured, prompting accusations of war crimes in the intervention. Following a Houthi missile attack against Riyadh in December 2017, which was intercepted by Saudi air defence, airstrikes killed 136 Yemeni civilians and injured 87 others in eleven days. In August 2018, the United Nations reported that all parties in the conflict were responsible for human rights violations and for actions which could be considered war crimes.

The war and blockade of Yemen has cost Saudi Arabia tens of billions of dollars, further aggravated the humanitarian crisis in the country and destroyed much of Yemen's infrastructure, but failed to dislodge the Shiite Houthi rebels and their allies from the Yemeni capital. More than 50,000 children in Yemen died from starvation in 2017. From 2015 to May 2019 the number of total deaths of children is said to be approximately 85,000. The famine in Yemen is the direct result of the Saudi-led intervention and blockade of the rebel-held area. In October 2018, Lise Grande, the United Nations Humanitarian Coordinator for Yemen, warned that 12 to 13 million Yemenis were at risk of starvation if the war continued for another three months. On 28 March 2018, Saudi Arabia, along with its coalition partner the UAE, donated US$930 million to the United Nations which, according to UN secretary-general António Guterres, "...(will) help to alleviate the suffering of millions of vulnerable people across Yemen". The funds cover almost one-third of the $2.96 billion required to implement the UN's 2018 Yemen Humanitarian Response Plan. Following the Houthi missile attack against Riyadh in December 2017, which was intercepted by Saudi air defence, Mohammed retaliated with a ten-day barrage of indiscriminate airstrikes against civilian areas in Yemen held by Houthi forces, killing dozens of children.

Following the assassination of Jamal Khashoggi, the United States Senate Committee on Foreign Relations approved a resolution to impose sanctions on people blocking humanitarian access in Yemen and suspend arms sales to Saudi Arabia. Senator Lindsey Graham said the Saudi Arabia–United States relationship "is more of a burden than an asset". He also said, "The crown prince [of Saudi Arabia] is so toxic, so tainted, so flawed."

Andrew Smith, of Campaign Against Arms Trade (CAAT), said that British foreign secretaries Boris Johnson and Jeremy Hunt "have played an utterly central and complicit role in arming and supporting the Saudi-led destruction of Yemen". Hunt's Conservative leadership campaign was partly funded by a close associate to Mohammed.

On 16 August 2020, a lawsuit filed by a former top intelligence official, Saad al-Jabri, revealed that in 2015 Mohammed secretly called for Russia to intervene in Syria at a time when Bashar al-Assad's regime was close to falling apart. The Saudi monarchy had been supporting anti-Assad rebels, including Ahrar al-Sham, while Russian and Syrian forces were bombing rebel-held cities in support of Assad, killing tens of thousands of Syrian civilians in the process. Western diplomats say that Mohammed was strongly influenced by Emirati politician Sheikh Mohammed bin Zayed Al Nahyan (who later became ruler of Abu Dhabi). The UAE was pushing for the idea of helping Russia stabilise Syria and enabling the Assad regime in the country. In 2017 it was reported that Saudi Arabia provided weapons to Syrian opposition groups, fighting against the Assad regime. Conflict Armament Research (CAR) reported that these weapons frequently ended up in the hands of the Islamic State members. In 2018, Mohammed reportedly wanted the US military presence to maintain in Syria, despite Donald Trump's declaring the withdrawal of American forces from the war-torn country.

In March 2023, Saudi Arabia began talks to bring Syria back into the Arab League, and provided economic support after the 2023 Turkey–Syria earthquake on 6 February. In May 2023, Syrian president Bashar al-Assad attended the Arab League summit in Jeddah where he was received by Mohammed.

=== Relations with Israel ===
In December 2017, Mohammed criticised the United States' decision to recognise Jerusalem as the capital of Israel. In 2018, he voiced his support for a Jewish homeland of Israel, the first time that a senior Saudi royal has expressed such sentiments publicly. In September 2019, Mohammed condemned Israeli Prime Minister Benjamin Netanyahu's plans to annex the eastern portion of the West Bank known as the Jordan Valley. In 2020, Mohammed met with Netanyahu and Israeli head of the Mossad Yosi Cohen in Neom. The United States had been pushing for Israel's normalisation for some years, calling (in this context) the Abraham Accords the "deal of the century", but Riyadh rejected reports of progress. In 2023, there were ongoing U.S. lead negotiations to establish diplomatic relations between Saudi Arabia and Israel. Mohammed also said that his country was moving steadily closer to normalising relations with Israel as part of the Abraham Accords. Due to the Gaza war, Mohammed called for a global arms embargo against Israel. Amid the Gaza war, according to reporting by The Atlantic, Mohammed told U.S. Secretary of State Antony Blinken in January 2024 that he was open to Saudi normalisation with Israel, adding, "Do I care personally about the Palestinian issue? I don't, but my people do."

Surveys in the early stages of the Gaza war showed that over 90 percent of Saudis citizens believed that the Arab states should break off their relations with Israel. In August 2024, Mohammad discussed his fears of facing assassination due to his support for establishing and normalising Saudi-Israel ties, and the threats he received. He believed for any deal, it was important to include a true path to the State of Palestine, keeping in mind the current Israel-Palestine war. Following the events in Gaza and Israel's attacks in Lebanon and Syria on 17 and 18 September 2024, Mohammad declared during the annual address to the Shura Council on 19 September 2024, that Saudi Arabia would not normalise relations with Israel until Palestine is recognised as a state with East Jerusalem as its capital. At the Riyadh Summit on 11 November 2024, Mohammed condemned Israel's actions in Gaza as a "collective genocide" and called on Israel to respect Iran's sovereignty. According to Bernard Haykel of Princeton University, Al Saud admires Israel's economic and technological success, and seeks mutual recognition with a focus on high-tech coordination.

=== Relations with Russia ===
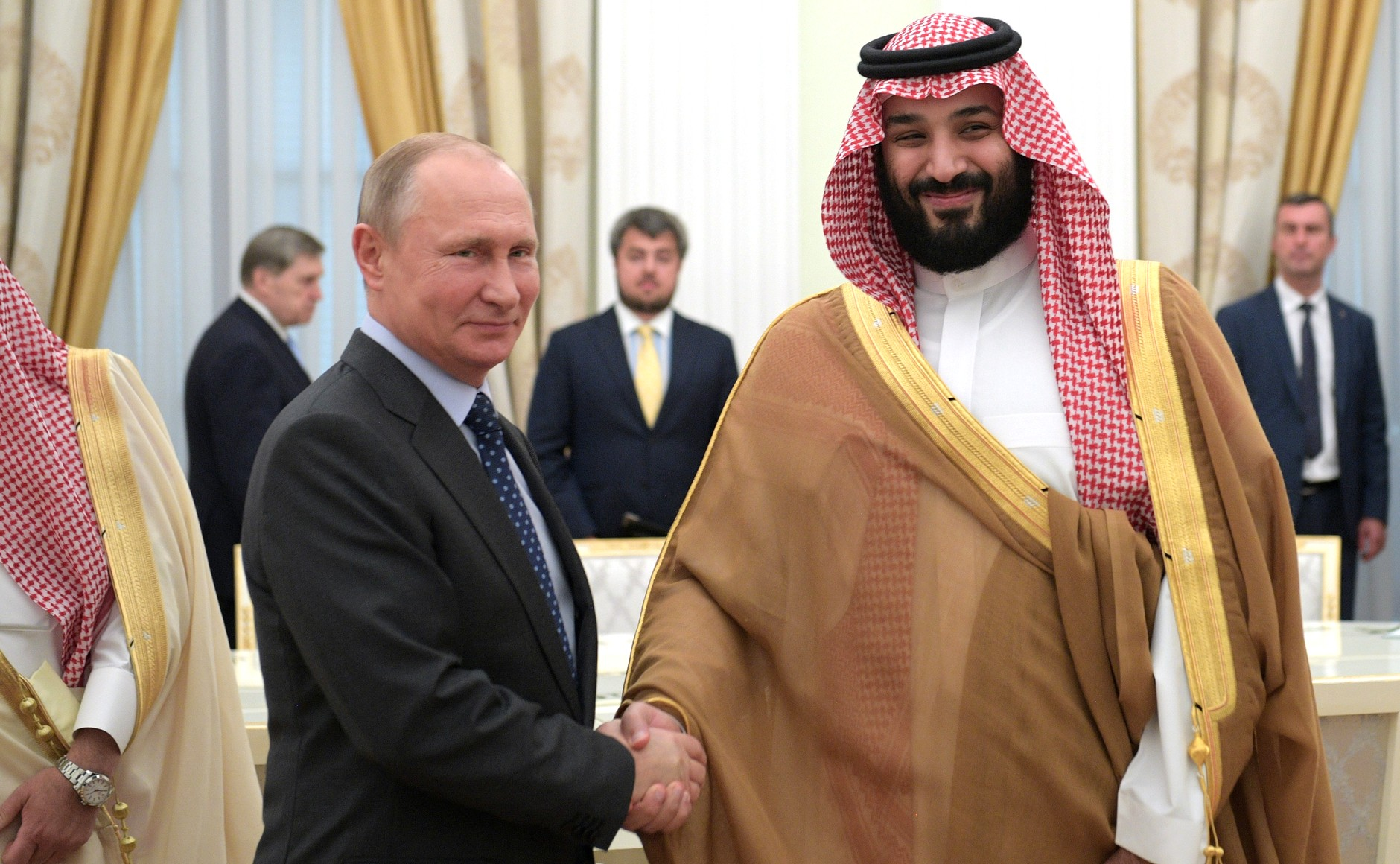
Mohammed with Russian president Vladimir Putin (left) in Moscow on 14 June 2018

Under Mohammed's leadership, Saudi Arabia strengthened its relationship with Russian president Vladimir Putin. In 2016, Mohammed signed an agreement to cooperate with Russia in global oil markets. After Mohammed was accused of murdering Jamal Khashoggi, Putin was one of few world leaders to publicly embrace the prince. Russia has also abstained from criticising Saudi-led intervention in Yemen and has supported the United Nations arms embargo against the Houthis in the Security Council. In 2021, Mohammed signed a military cooperation agreement with Russia.

Amidst Western isolation following Russia's invasion of Ukraine, Mohammed strengthened his personal relationship with Vladimir Putin and expanded Saudi-Russia relations. Russia and Saudi Arabia have since been co-operating through the OPEC to cut oil output and increase oil prices. In September 2022, five British and two American POWs captured in Ukraine were released by Russia through Saudi mediation. Russia's new foreign policy concept unveiled in 2023 has given priority to enhancing friendly relations with Saudi Arabia. In December 2023, Putin visited Saudi Arabia and met with Mohammed.

Mohammed hosted Ukrainian president Volodymyr Zelenskyy in Riyadh on 10 March 2025, ahead of U.S.-Ukraine talks. Saudi Arabia has positioned itself as a mediator in global conflicts, including Ukraine and earlier U.S.-Russia negotiations,.

=== Relations with Iran ===
Following Masoud Pezeshkian's victory in the 2024 Iranian presidential election, King Salman and Mohammed sent congratulatory messages. According to the Saudi Press Agency (SPA), Mohammed emphasized his "keenness on developing and deepening relations" and expressed a desire to serve the "mutual interests" of both countries. Pezeshkian and Mohammed significantly strengthened diplomatic ties, reaching what Mohammed described as a "historic turning point." In late January 2026, Pezeshkian and Mohammed held a critical phone call to discuss regional stability following the arrival of a U.S. aircraft carrier in the region. Mohammed emphasized that Saudi Arabia would not allow its territory or airspace to be used for military actions against Iran.

According to The Washington Post, Mohammed conducted multiple phone calls with U.S. President Trump urging him to attack Iran, stating that "Iran would become stronger and more dangerous if Washington did not strike immediately". The Washington Post reported that Trump's decision to attack Iran on 28 February 2026 came after the Saudi Arabian and Israeli governments lobbied him repeatedly to make the move. Saudi Arabia has officially denied reports that Mohammed privately urged Trump to launch military strikes against Iran. On 15 March 2026, The New York Times reported that Mohammed had urged Trump to "keep hitting the Iranians hard."

=== Relations with Turkey ===
In March 2018, Mohammed referred to Turkey as part of a "triangle of evil" alongside Iran and the Muslim Brotherhood. However, Mohammed later led a reconciliation with Turkey in 2022, leading to improved relations between the countries. In July 2023, the Crown Prince and Turkish president Recep Tayyip Erdoğan agreed to a major deal for Saudi Arabia to purchase Turkish Baykar Bayraktar Akıncı drones.

=== Relations with the United States ===
==== Relations with the first Trump administration ====
In August 2016, Donald Trump Jr., the son of US presidential candidate Donald Trump, had a meeting with an envoy representing Mohammed bin Salman and the crown prince of Abu Dhabi, Mohammed bin Zayed. The envoy offered help to the Trump campaign. The meeting included Joel Zamel, an Israeli social media expert, Lebanese-American businessman George Nader, and Blackwater founder Erik Prince.

Upon Trump's election, support for Mohammed bin Salman was described as one of the few issues where rival White House advisers Jared Kushner and Steve Bannon agreed. Mohammed, then deputy crown prince, was subsequently invited to the White House and given the treatment typically afforded to foreign heads of state by diplomatic protocol. He subsequently defended the Trump administration's travel ban for nationals of 7 Muslim-majority countries, stating that "Saudi Arabia does not believe that this measure is targeting Muslim countries or the religion of Islam". Kushner also inquired as to how the US could support Mohammed in the succession process. After Mohammed became crown prince, Trump reportedly said, "We've put our man on top". Trump initially supported the Saudi-led blockade of Qatar, despite opposition from US secretary of state Rex Tillerson and Secretary of Defense James Mattis, though he later changed his position. Mohammed later reportedly claimed Kushner had provided intelligence assistance on domestic rivals to Mohammed during the 2017–2019 Saudi Arabian purge, which Trump had personally expressed support for. The Trump administration also firmly supported Mohammed during global backlash following the assassination of Jamal Khashoggi.

==== Relations with the Biden administration ====
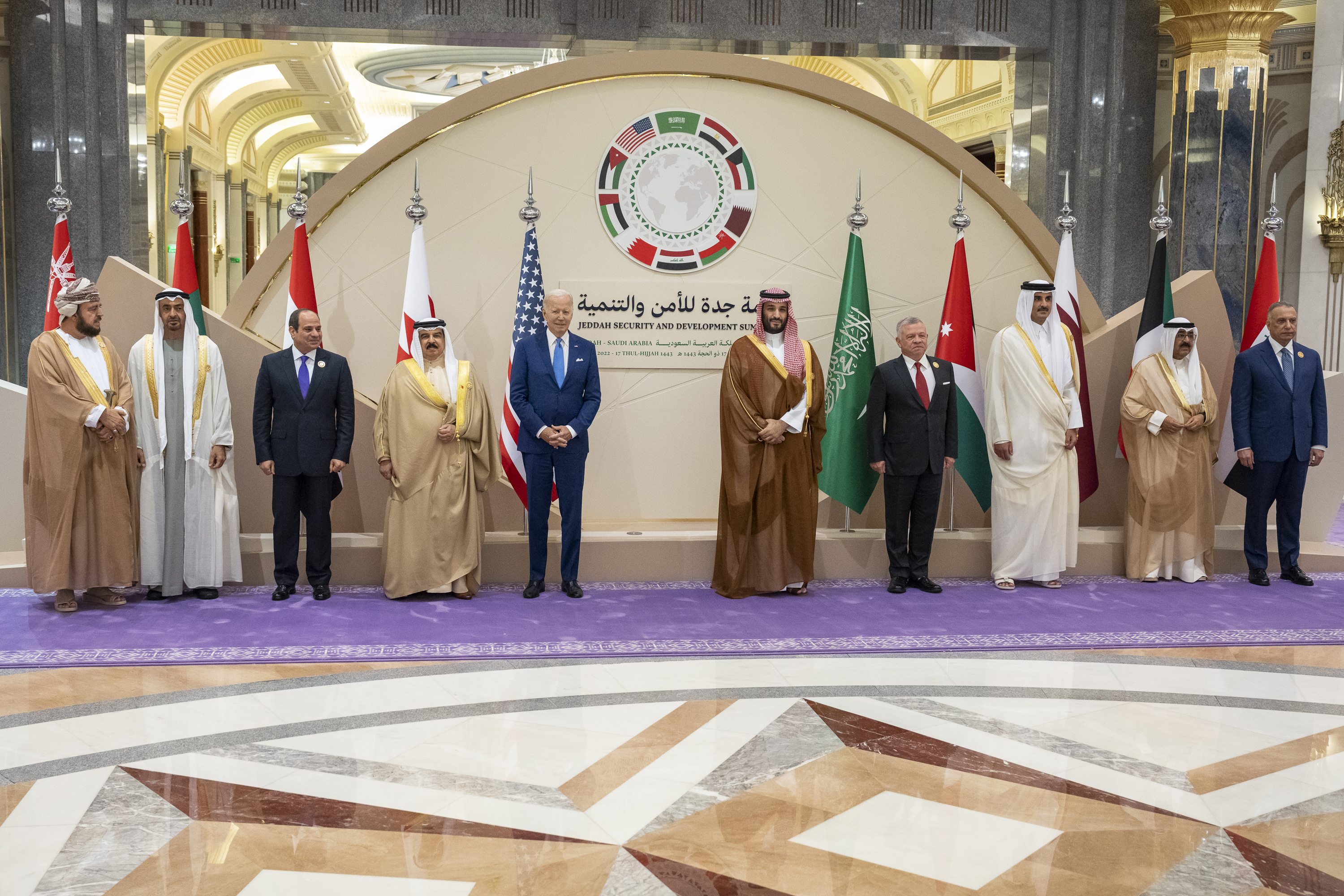
Mohammed with Arab leaders, U.S. president Joe Biden at the GCC+3 summit in Jeddah on 16 July 2022

In 2019, during the Trump administration, Joe Biden criticised Mohammed, describing him as a pariah due to the 2018 killing of Jamal Khashoggi. In July 2021, six months into the Biden presidency, Saudi deputy defence minister Khalid bin Salman Al Saud (Mohammed's brother) visited the United States. It was the first meeting between senior US and Saudi officials after Jamal Khashoggi was murdered in 2018. In September 2021, Biden's national security adviser Jake Sullivan met with Mohammed. In the meeting, Mohammed reportedly ended up shouting at Sullivan after he raised the killing of Khashoggi.

US-Saudi trade relations has also sunk drastically from a height of 76 billion dollars in 2012 to just about 29 billion dollars in 2021. After Russia invaded Ukraine in 2022, Saudi Arabia declined US requests to increase oil production and thus undercut Russia's war finances. The Wall Street Journal wrote in April 2022 that the US-Saudi relationship was at "its lowest point in decades". In April 2022, CIA director William Burns traveled to Saudi Arabia to meet with Mohammed, asking him to increase the country's oil production. They also discussed Saudi weapons purchases from China.

Relations between the United States and Saudi Arabia became weak after OPEC+ announced a cut in oil production by two million barrels a day. The US government was angered by the move, accusing Saudi Arabia of siding with Russia in its war against Ukraine. The Saudi government denied these claims, claiming that the move was not politically motivated but to bring stability in global oil markets. The Saudi government also declined a US request to postpone an OPEC decision until after the 2022 United States elections, leading Biden to threaten "consequences" against Saudi Arabia.

Saudi Arabia's relations with the Biden administration were strained, especially after Mohammed's refusal to increase oil production in the wake of the Russian invasion of Ukraine. However, relations warmed with Biden's official visit to Saudi Arabia, The Pentagon's approval of a $500m arms deal, a bipartisan group visit of US senators to Saudi Arabia, and relaxing restrictions on offensive weapons sales.

==== Relations with the second Trump administration ====
Mohammed with U.S. president Donald Trump at the White House on 18 November 2025

From 13 to 16 May 2025, Donald Trump undertook his first major international trip of his second term, visiting Saudi Arabia, Qatar, and the United Arab Emirates. Trump and Mohammed signed a "strategic economic partnership" agreement. The visit elevated Mohammed's standing within the Saudi government as King Salman, who did not appear during the Saudi visit, has largely receded from public view. In contrast to the 2017 Riyadh summit, Mohammed greeted Trump at King Khalid International Airport, rather than Salman.

=== Relations with Qatar ===
On 5 June 2017, Saudi Arabia under Mohammed spearheaded a diplomatic crisis with Qatar together with the United Arab Emirates, Bahrain and Egypt, with the countries severing diplomatic relations with Qatar and effectively imposing a blockade on the country. The countries cited Qatar's alleged support for terrorism as the main reason for the actions, also citing Al Jazeera and Qatar's relations with Iran. Reuters reported that Mohammed "said the dispute with Qatar could be long-lasting, comparing it to the US embargo against Cuba imposed 60 years before, but played down its impact, dismissing the Gulf emirate as "smaller than a Cairo street". In August 2018, a report by The Intercept cited unnamed sources claiming that former US secretary of state Rex Tillerson had in June 2017 intervened to stop a Saudi-Emirati plan to invade Qatar, resulting in increased pressure from Saudi Arabia and the UAE for his removal from office.

On 4 January 2021, Qatar and Saudi Arabia agreed to a resolution of the crisis brokered by Kuwait and the United States, which stated that Saudi Arabia will reopen its border with Qatar and begin the process for reconciliation. An agreement and final communiqué signed on 5 January 2021 following a GCC summit at Al-'Ula marks the resolution of the crisis.

=== Resignation of Saad Hariri ===
In November 2017, Mohammed forced Lebanese prime minister Saad Hariri to resign when he visited Saudi Arabia. Mohammed believed that Hariri was in the pocket of Iran-backed Hezbollah, which is a major political force in Lebanon. Hariri eventually was released, went back to Lebanon and annulled his resignation.

=== Relations with Canada ===
Canada and the Kingdom of Saudi Arabia have had a generally cordial relationship marred by periods of diplomatic tension. Both countries, however, share robust economic ties: Saudi Arabia is Canada's largest trading partner in the Middle East, and is also one of the largest recipients of Canadian military equipment. In February 2014, the Saudi government had purchased Canadian armaments worth CA$15 billion in total. Until August 2018, there were over 16,000 Saudi students enrolled in Canadian schools on government scholarships.

Since 2018, bilateral relations have gradually soured since a high-profile diplomatic spat began over the Canadian government's public condemnation of the Saudi government's human rights abuses. Canada had called for the immediate release of Saudi activist Raif Badawi and his sister Samar Badawi on 5 August 2018 after they were arrested by Saudi authorities on varying charges. In response, the Canadian government was accused of interfering in Saudi Arabia's internal affairs; the Canadian ambassador in Riyadh was declared persona non grata and expelled from the country, having been given 48 hours to leave. The Saudi ambassador in Ottawa was also recalled, and the Saudi government suspended all new trade (excluding oil sales) with Canada, terminated all flights and services of Saudia to Toronto, and cancelled the scholarships of thousands of Saudi students in Canada.

Chrystia Freeland, Canada's minister of foreign affairs, issued a statement via Twitter on 2 August 2018 expressing Canada's concern over the recent arrest of Samar Badawi, a human rights activist and sister of imprisoned Saudi blogger Raif Badawi, and called for the release of human rights activists. In response to Canada's criticism, Saudi Arabia expelled Canada's ambassador and froze trade with Canada. The Toronto Star reported that the consensus among analysts indicated that the actions taken by Mohammed were a "warning to the world — and to Saudi human rights activists — that his Saudi Arabia is not to be trifled with". The diplomatic ties were restored on 24 May 2023.

=== Relations with China ===
Relations between China and Saudi Arabia have deepened under the leadership of Mohammed; since he became crown prince in 2017, trade between the two countries have increased from $51.5 billion to $87.5 billion in 2021. In February 2019, Mohammed defended China's policies in Xinjiang, where more than 1 million Uyghurs were put into re-education camps, saying "China has the right to carry out anti-terrorism and de-extremisation work for its national security.". A spokesperson for the Muslim Council of Britain, called Mohammed's remarks "disgusting" and a defence of "the use of concentration camps against Uighur Muslims". China has been Saudi Arabia's largest economic partner since 2014 and Saudi Arabia is the biggest source of China's oil imports. In 2019, Chinese officials announced plans to incorporate Saudi Vision 2030 into the Belt and Road Initiative, and expand economic, cultural, strategic and military co-operation.

Since 2021, China has been assisting in Saudi Arabia's ballistic missile programme by transferring technology and making joint ventures for missile production. Mohammed hosted Chinese president Xi Jinping in Riyadh for talks on 7–10 December 2022. During the visit, Xi met with numerous Arab leaders, including members of the Gulf Cooperation Council. Xi also signed numerous commercial deals with Saudi Arabia and formally elevated the relationship to comprehensive strategic partnership, highest level in China's formal ranking of relations with other countries. The deal also expanded military and security ties, with both sides agreeing for joint production of UAV systems in Saudi Arabia. Describing the GCC summit as a "milestone event" in the history of Sino-Arab friendship, Xi urged the Gulf countries to start making oil transaction through Renminbi, a move widely seen as China's efforts to establish Renminbi as a world currency.

During the 2022 Airshow China held in Zhuhai, Saudi Arabia and China concluded arms deal worth $4 billion. Under the contract, Saudi Arabia purchased hundreds of Chinese drones, ballistic missiles, Silent Hunter DEWs in addition to technology transfer that enables indigenous manufacturing of various armaments. On 10 March 2023, Saudi Arabia and Iran agreed to restore diplomatic ties cut in 2016 after a deal brokered between the two countries by China following secret talks in Beijing.

=== Intimidation of Saad al-Jabri ===
On 9 July 2020, four United States senators urged President Trump to secure the freedom of Saad al-Jabri's children Omar and Sarah, calling it a "moral obligation" to support a man who aided the US intelligence for years and had close ties with key members of the Saudi royal family. The Saudi government detained Omar and Sarah in March 2020 and, to date, their whereabouts remain unknown. Saudi Arabia had issued an extradition request and Interpol notices to bring back Saad al-Jabri, who was the US anti-terrorism contact in the Middle East and was staying in Canada since 2018. The Interpol notice against al-Jabri was removed, citing that he was a political opponent of Mohammed.

In August 2020, al-Jabri filed a federal lawsuit in Washington, DC, alleging that Mohammed dispatched a "Tiger Squad" to Canada during October 2018 to assassinate al-Jabri, who was the closest adviser to Mohammed's chief rival, Muhammad bin Nayef. The squad was identified and returned by Canadian authorities. Following the lawsuit, the US District Court for the District of Columbia issued the summons against Mohammed bin Salman, along with 11 other people. The summons stated that a judgement would be taken by default against the concerned parties if they fail to respond. Documents filed to the court revealed that Mohammed was served the lawsuit on 22 September 2020 at 4:05 p.m. ET via WhatsApp, and twenty minutes later the message was marked as "read".

=== Hack of Jeff Bezos's phone ===
In March 2019, Gavin de Becker, a security specialist working for Jeff Bezos, accused Saudi Arabia of hacking Bezos's phone. Bezos was the owner of The Washington Post, the leader of the company Amazon, and the world's richest man at the time.

In January 2020, the results of FTI Consulting's forensic investigation of Bezos' phone were made public. The company concluded with "medium to high confidence" that Bezos' phone was hacked by a multimedia message sent in May 2018 from Mohammed's WhatsApp account, after which the phone begun transmitting dramatically higher amounts of data. The report points to circumstantial evidence: first, a November 2018 message from Mohammed to Bezos includes an image resembling the woman Bezos was having an affair with, despite the affair not being public knowledge at the time; second, a February 2019 text from Mohammed to Bezos urges Bezos not to believe everything, after Bezos was briefed on the phone regarding an Internet campaign against him conducted by Saudis.

United Nations special rapporteurs Agnès Callamard and David Kaye reacted that the alleged hack suggests that Mohammed participated "in an effort to influence, if not silence, The Washington Post's reporting on Saudi Arabia". They declared that the alleged hacking was relevant to the issue of whether Mohammed was involved in the killing of Jamal Khashoggi, who worked for The Washington Post.

=== Environmentalism ===
Under Mohammed's leadership, Saudi Arabia has lobbied to weaken global carbon emissions-reduction agreements. Mohammed has made commitments about Saudi Arabia reaching net zero emissions but they are based primarily on unproven carbon capture and storage technologies.

== Controversies ==
=== Assassination of Jamal Khashoggi ===
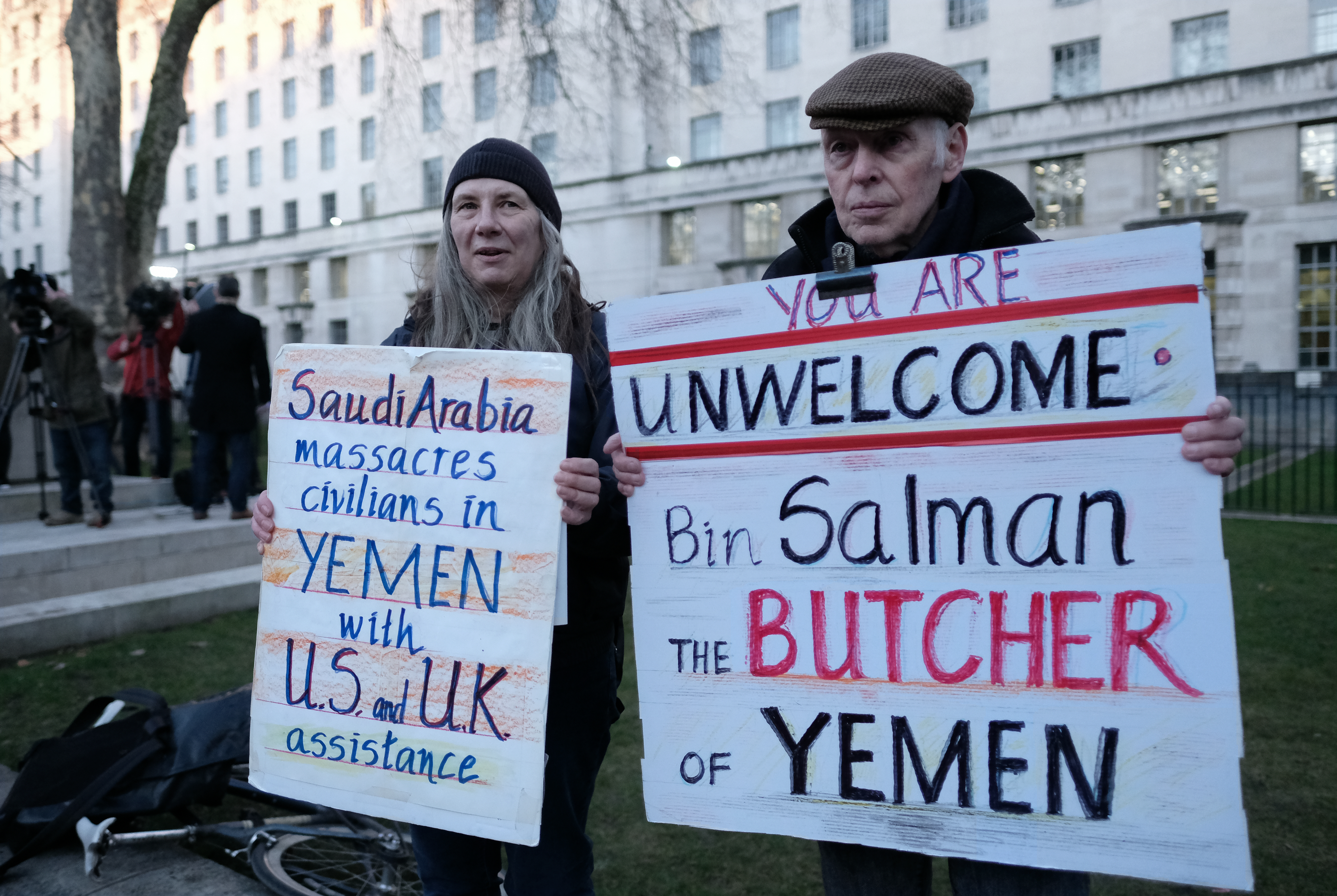
Protest in London against Mohammed's state visit to the United Kingdom on 7 March 2018

In October 2018, Saudi journalist Jamal Khashoggi, a critic of Mohammed, went missing after entering the Saudi consulate in Istanbul. Turkish officials reportedly ascertained that Khashoggi was murdered at the consulate, claiming to have specific video and audio recordings proving that he was first tortured and then murdered, and that a medical forensics expert was part of the 15-man Saudi team seen entering and leaving the consulate at the time of the journalist's disappearance. Saudi Arabia denied the accusations and 13 days later Mohammed invited Turkish authorities to search the building as they "have nothing to hide". Saudi officials said they are "working to search for him". The Washington Post reported that Mohammed had earlier sought to lure Khashoggi back to Saudi Arabia and detain him.

According to Middle East Eye, seven of the fifteen men suspected of killing Khashoggi are members of Mohammed's personal bodyguard. John Sawers, a former head of the British MI6, stated that in his judgment of the evidence it is "very likely" that Mohammed ordered the killing of Khashoggi.

In the aftermath of Khashoggi's death, multiple commentators referred to Mohammed as "Mister Bone Saw", a play on the initials MBS. The name refers to the alleged use of a bone saw to dispose of Khashoggi's remains.

Mohammed has denied any involvement in the murder and blamed the assassination on rogue operators. However, Western investigators and observers are not convinced and assert this could not have happened without Mohammed's knowledge or approval. Donald Trump described the Saudi response to the killing as "one of the worst in the history of cover-ups." Trump also claims that Mohammed at least knew about the plan, saying that "the prince is running things over there more so at this stage."

After the murder, Mohammed's close confidant Ahmad Asiri was sacked, as was former advisor Saud al-Qahtani.

The recording of Khashoggi's killing collected by Turkish intelligence reportedly reveals that one of the members of the kill team instructed someone over the phone to "tell your boss, the deed was done." American intelligence officials conclude that "boss" was a reference to the Crown Prince. The person who made the call was identified as Maher Abdulaziz Mutreb, a security officer who is frequently seen travelling with the prince.

Seven weeks after Khashoggi's death, Saudi Arabia, in order to "distance ... Crown Prince Mohammed bin Salman, from the grisly murder" stated it would pursue the death penalty for five suspects charged with "ordering and executing the crime".

On 16 November 2018, it was reported that the US Central Intelligence Agency (CIA) had concluded with "high confidence" that Mohammed ordered Khashoggi's murder. The CIA based its conclusion on several pieces of evidence, including an intercepted conversation in which Mohammed's brother Khalid offered Khashoggi assurances that it would be safe for the journalist to enter Saudi Arabia's consulate in Istanbul. Although the CIA reportedly had not determined whether Khalid had any foreknowledge of Khashoggi's ultimate fate upon entering the consulate, it thought that Khalid conveyed this message to Khashoggi at Mohammed's behest. In the CIA's analysis, the killing was most likely motivated by Mohammed's privately stated assumption that Khashoggi was an Islamist with problematic connections to the Muslim Brotherhood, a perception that differs markedly from the Saudi government's public remarks on Khashoggi's death.

On 4 December 2018, a group of United States senators were briefed by CIA director Gina Haspel on the murder of Khashoggi. After the briefing, the senators were more than certain that Mohammed played a major role in the killing. Senator Lindsey Graham said, "You have to be willfully blind not to come to the conclusion that this was orchestrated and organized by people under the command of MBS and that he was intrinsically involved in the demise of Mr. Khashoggi." Senator Bob Corker said that the prince "ordered, monitored, the killing" and "If he were in front of a jury, he would be convicted of murder in about 30 minutes." On 5 December 2018, UN Human Rights chief Michelle Bachelet asked for an international investigation to determine who was behind Khashoggi's murder.

A former Saudi intelligence chief and senior member of the Saudi royal family, Prince Turki Al-Faisal, dismissed the CIA's reported finding that Mohammed ordered the journalist's killing, saying that "The CIA has been proved wrong before. Just to mention the invasion of Iraq for example."

In March 2019, US senators accused Saudi Arabia for a number of repetitive misdeeds and criticised Mohammed, saying he has gone "full gangster". The senators said the list of human rights violations by Saudi Arabia is too long to comprehend the situation in the kingdom or even work with Mohammed.

In June 2019, a UN report entitled "Annex to the Report of the Special Rapporteur on extrajudicial, summary or arbitrary executions: Investigation into the unlawful death of Mr. Jamal Khashoggi" linked Mohammed to the assassination.

In a June 2019 article, The Guardian claimed that after Khashoggi's assassination, the media group became a target of hacking attempts made by a Saudi cybersecurity subdivision, as per an internal order document obtained by the group, with Saud al-Qahtani undersigned. According to an interview in a PBS documentary film recorded in December 2018 and parts released in September 2019, Mohammed bears responsibility for the killing of Khashoggi since it happened under his watch but he denies any knowledge of the murder in advance. He denied in an interview with CBS' 60 Minutes aired on 29 September 2019 any personal involvement in the killing, adding that "once charges are proven against someone, regardless of their rank, it will be taken to court, no exception made", but said that he had to take "full responsibility for what happened".

On 25 February 2021, the Office of the Director of National Intelligence issued a declassified report approved by Director Avril Haines. The report, "Assessing the Saudi Government's Role in the Killing of Jamal Khashoggi" stated that, "We assess that Saudi Arabia's Crown Prince Muhammad bin Salman approved an operation in Istanbul, Turkey to capture or kill Saudi journalist Jamal Khashoggi."

On 26 February 2021, the United Nations Special Rapporteur on extrajudicial, summary or arbitrary executions Agnès Callamard released a statement urging, "The United States Government should impose sanctions against the Crown Prince, as it has done for the other perpetrators targeting his personal assets but also his international engagements."

On 18 November 2022, due to his new role as the Saudi prime minister, Mohammed got US immunity over Khashoggi's murder. However, Biden's administration emphasised that this was not a determination of innocence.

=== Relationship with Jeffrey Epstein ===
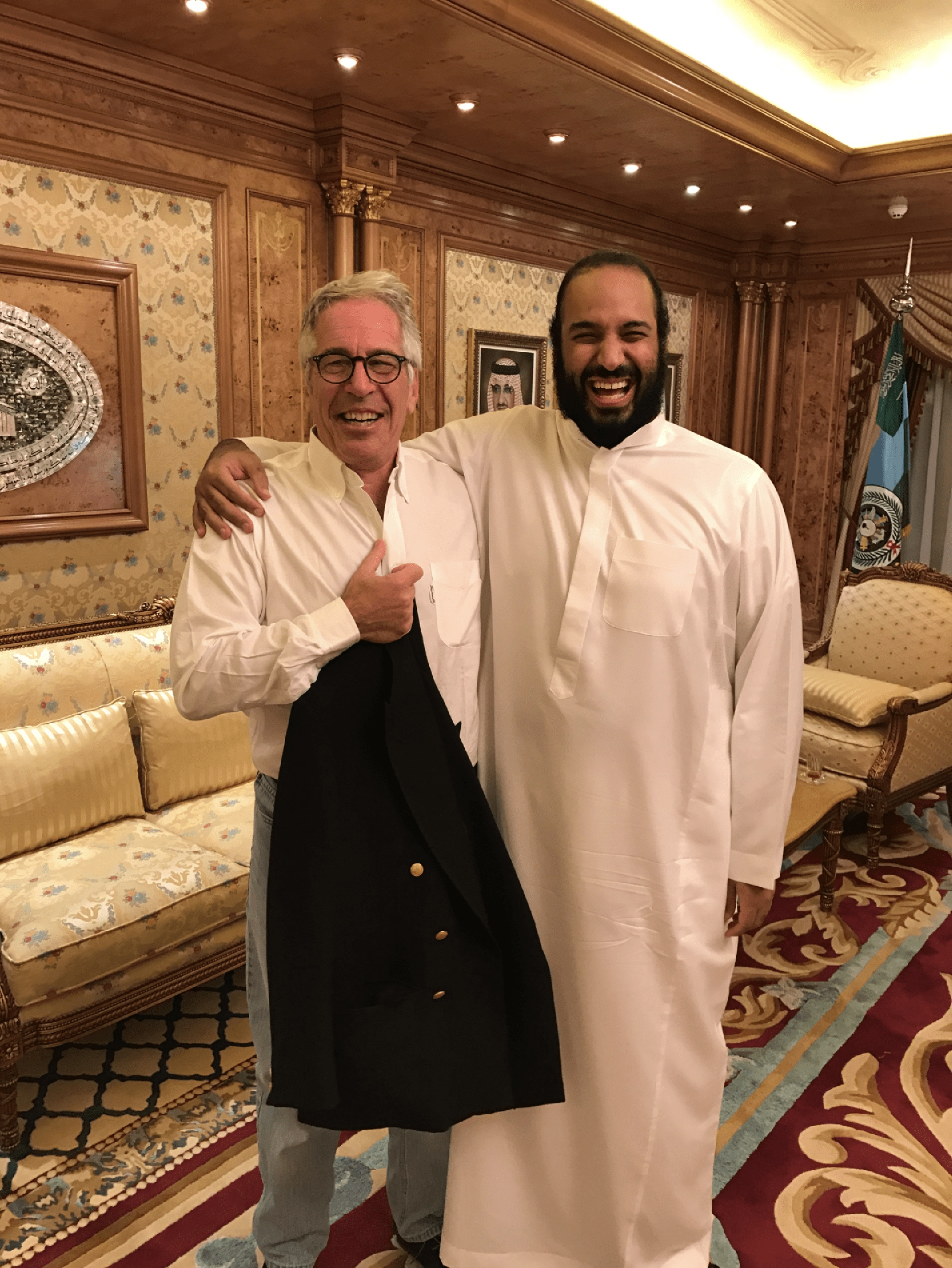
Jeffrey Epstein with Saudi Crown Prince Mohammed bin Salman in Riyadh between 2016 and 2017

Mohammed bin Salman was found in the Epstein files. In 2025, The New York Times published a frame picture of the Crown Prince found in Jeffrey Epstein's apartment. Epstein referenced his ties to MbS in emails exchanged with The New York Times reporter Thomas Landon. Epstein traveled to Saudi Arabia in 2016 to meet with MbS, after being in contact with Raafat al-Sabagh, one of his advisers.

== Personal life ==
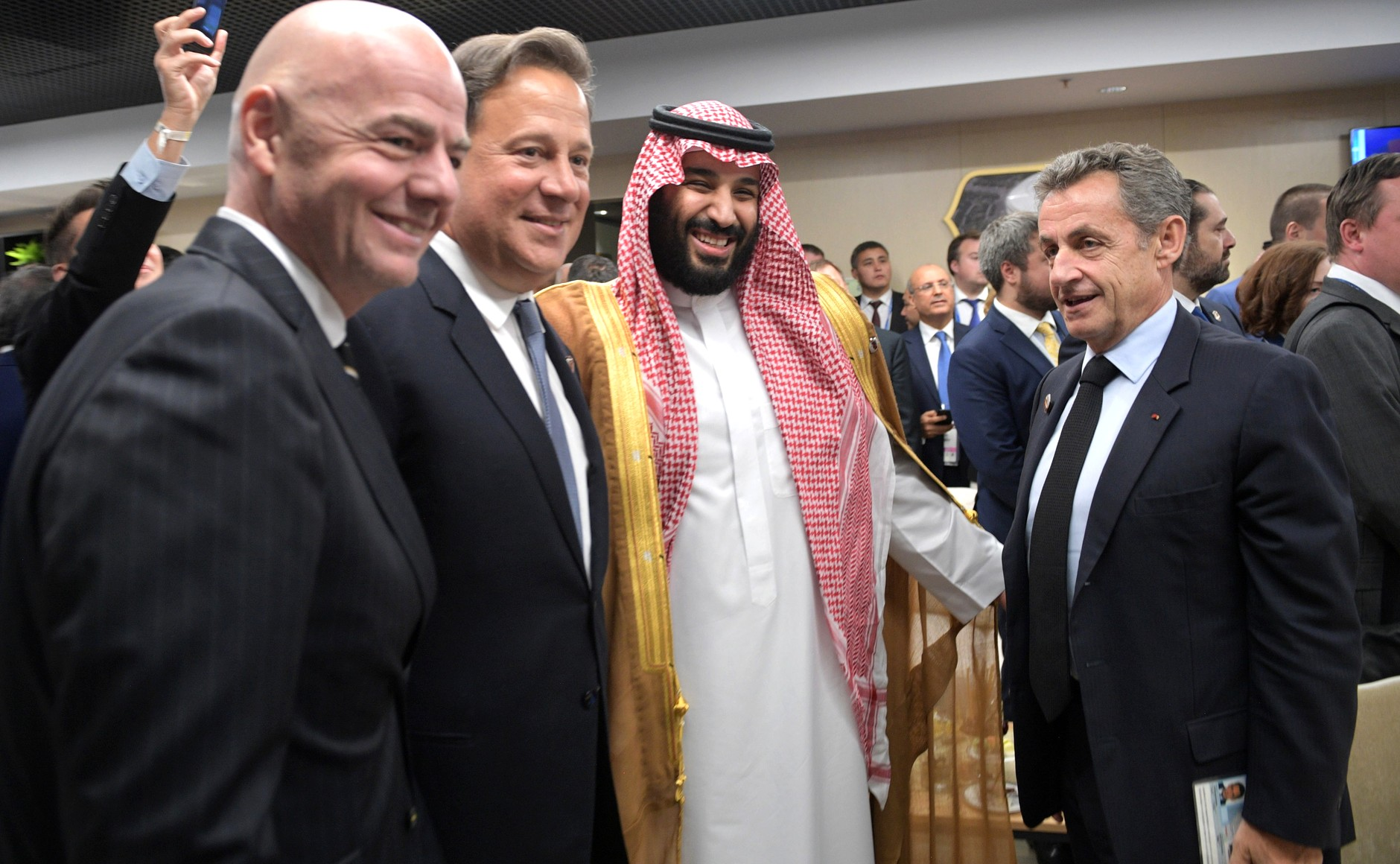
From left to right: FIFA president Gianni Infantino, Panamanian president Juan Carlos Varela, Mohammed bin Salman, and former French president Nicolas Sarkozy at the 2018 FIFA World Cup

On 6 April 2008, Mohammed married his first cousin Sara bint Mashour, a daughter of his paternal uncle Mashour bin Abdulaziz. The couple have five children; the first four were named after their grandparents, and the fifth one is named after their great-grandfather King Abdulaziz, the founder of Saudi Arabia. In 2022, The Economist reported that on at least one occasion, Mohammed beat Sara so severely that she required medical treatment.

In 2015, Mohammed purchased the Italian-built and Bermuda-registered yacht Serene from Russian vodka tycoon Yuri Shefler for €500 million. In 2015, he purchased the Château Louis XIV in France for over $300 million. In 2018, he was ranked by Forbes as the eighth most powerful person in the world, with a personal wealth of at least $25 billion, although his wealth was also estimated at $3.0 billion the same year.

In December 2017, a number of sources reported that Mohammed, using his close associate Prince Badr bin Abdullah bin Mohammed Al Farhan as an intermediary, had bought Salvator Mundi by Leonardo da Vinci; the sale in November at $450 million set a new record price for a work of art. This report has been denied by the auctioneer Christie's, the Saudi Arabian embassy, and the UAE government, which has announced that it is the actual owner of the painting. The painting has not been seen publicly since the auction, but is reported to be on Mohammed's yacht Serene. Bernard Haykel, a prominent historian who speaks regularly to Mohammed, said to the BBC that despite rumours that it is hanging "in the prince's yacht or palace", it is actually stored in Geneva and will be hung in a "very large" museum in the Riyadh that is yet been to be built as intended by him to be an "anchor object" that would attract tourists "just like the Mona Lisa does."

Mohammed has been an avid video gamer since childhood. He also enjoys hiking and diving in his spare time.

== Honours ==
In November 2026, Mohammed and King Salman of Saudi Arabia shared the top ranking on The 500 Most Influential Muslims list compiled by the Royal Islamic Strategic Studies Centre, alongside Pakistan's Prime Minister Shehbaz Sharif and Chief of Defence Forces Asim Munir, and Turkish President Recep Tayyip Erdogan.

Country	Collar	Order	Year	Ref.
Bahrain		Member Exceptional Class of the Order of Sheikh Isa bin Salman Al Khalifa	2018	
Tunisia		Grand Cordon of the Order of the Republic	2018	
Pakistan		Nishan-e-Pakistan	2019	
Oman		Civil First Class of the Order of Oman	2021	
UAE		Collar of the Order of Zayed	2021	
Jordan		Collar of the Order of Al-Hussein bin Ali	2022	
Ukraine	Order of Prince Yaroslav the Wise 1st 2nd and 3rd Class of Ukraine	First Class of the Order of Prince Yaroslav the Wise	2023	

== Ancestry ==
Ancestors of Mohammed bin Salman

16. Faisal bin Turki bin Abdullah Al Saud
8. Abdul Rahman bin Faisal Al Saud
17. Sara bint Mishari bin Abdulrahman bin Hassan Al Saud
4. Abdulaziz ibn Saud
18. Ahmed Al Kabir bin Mohammed bin Turki Al Sudairi
9. Sara bint Ahmed Al Sudairi
2. Salman bin Abdulaziz Al Saud
20. Mohammed bin Ahmed Al Kabir Al Sudairi
10. Ahmed bin Mohammed Al Sudairi
5. Hussa bint Ahmed Al Sudairi
22. Ali bin Mohammed Al Suwaidi
11. Sharifa bint Ali bin Mohammed Al Suwaidi
1. Mohammed bin Salman Al Saud
24. Hithlain Al Ajman
12. Sultan bin Hithlain
6. Falah bin Sultan
3. Fahda bint Falah Al Hithlain
14. Abdullah
7. Munira bint Abdullah

== See also ==
- List of current heirs apparent
- List of state leaders by age#Youngest serving state leaders

Political offices
Preceded by Muhammad bin Nayef Al Saud	First Deputy Prime Minister; 21 June 2017 – 27 September 2022	Vacant
Preceded by Muhammad bin Nayef Al Saud	Second Deputy Prime Minister; 29 April 2015 – 21 June 2017	Vacant
Preceded by Salman bin Abdulaziz Al Saud	Minister of Defence; 2015–2022	Succeeded by Khalid bin Salman Al Saud
Preceded by Khaled al-Tuwaijri	Chief of the Royal Court; 2015–2022	Succeeded by Fahd bin Mohammed bin Saleh Al-Issa
Preceded by Salman bin Abdulaziz Al Saud	Prime Minister of Saudi Arabia; 2022–present	Incumbent
Saudi Arabian royalty
Preceded by Muhammad bin Nayef	Deputy Crown Prince of Saudi Arabia; 2015–2017	Vacant
Preceded by Muhammad bin Nayef	Crown Prince of Saudi Arabia; 2017–present	Incumbent
