= Mohammad al-Tobaishi =

Mohammad al-Tobaishi was the former head of protocol at the royal court of the House of Saud.

== Head of protocol ==
Mohammad al-Tobaishi served as head of protocol under King Abdullah. He was removed from that position on 3 May 2013, but reinstated on 1 August 2013.

He continued to serve under King Salman until 5 May, 2015, when he was dismissed by royal order without further explaination. Prior to his dismissal, television footage that appeared to show al-Tobaishi slapping a photographer had been widely circulated on social media, generating online condemnation.

== Arrest ==
On 4 November 2017, Mohammad al-Tobaishi was arrested in Saudi Arabia in a "corruption crackdown" conducted by a new royal anti-corruption committee. This was done on authority of Crown Prince Mohammad Bin Salman.

Al-Tubaishi was reported released on 28 November 2017 after investigations were done and cleared.
