= 2017 Riyadh summit =

2017 U.S.-Saudi diplomatic meeting

Riyadh Summit 2017
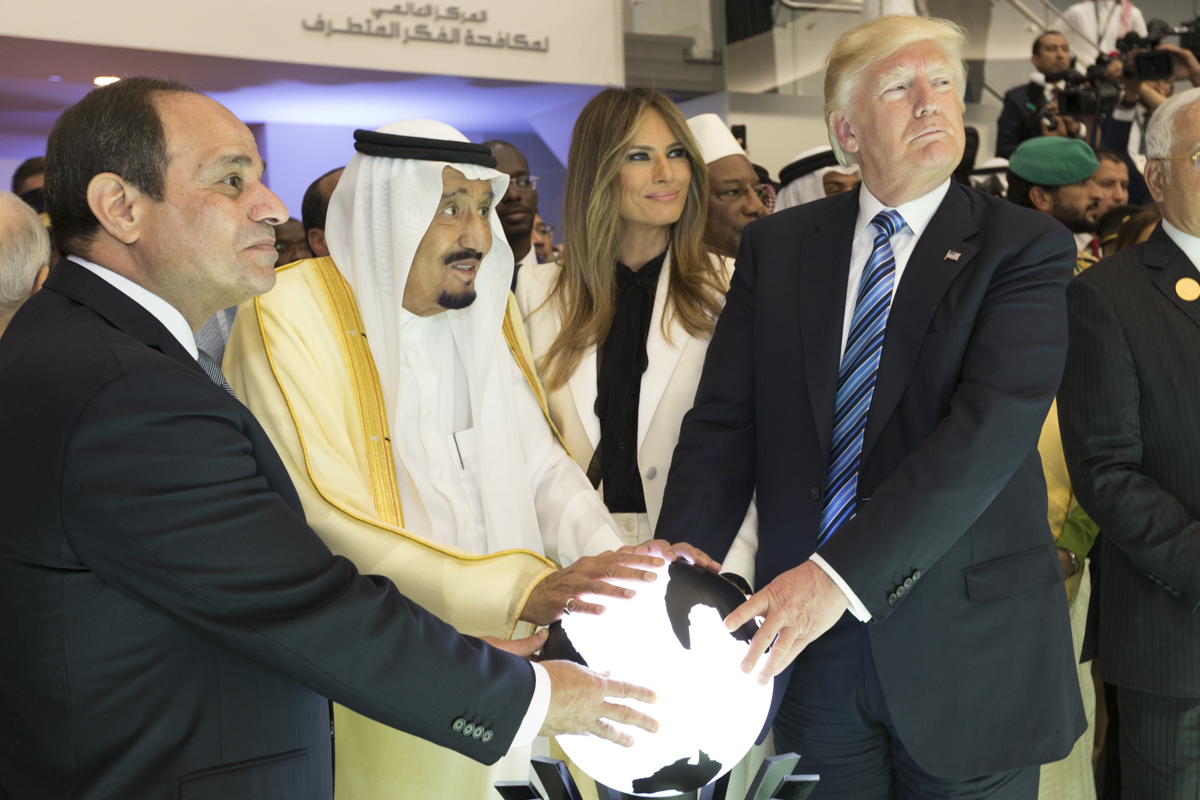
- King Salman, Presidents Trump and el-Sisi inaugurate the Global Center for Combating Extremism by touching an illuminated globe of the Earth.
- Host country: Saudi Arabia
- Date: May 20, 2017 – May 21, 2017
- Motto: Together, We Prevail
- Cities: Riyadh, Saudi Arabia
- Venues: The Ritz-Carlton, Riyadh; King Abdulaziz International Conference Center
- Participants: See below
- Chair: King Salman of Saudi Arabia
- Website: riyadhsummit2017.org

The 2017 Riyadh summit (Arabic: قمة الرياض 2017) was a series of three summits held on 20–21 May 2017 on the occasion of the visit of United States President Donald Trump to Saudi Arabia, his first trip overseas. The summit included one bilateral meeting, between the United States and Saudi Arabia, and two multilateral meetings, one between the members of the Gulf Cooperation Council and the other with Arab and Muslim countries. Leaders and representatives of 54 Arab and Muslim countries, all members of the Organisation of Islamic Cooperation, and the United States took part. Iran and Turkey boycotted the summit, and Syria was not invited.

== United States–Saudi Arabia summit ==
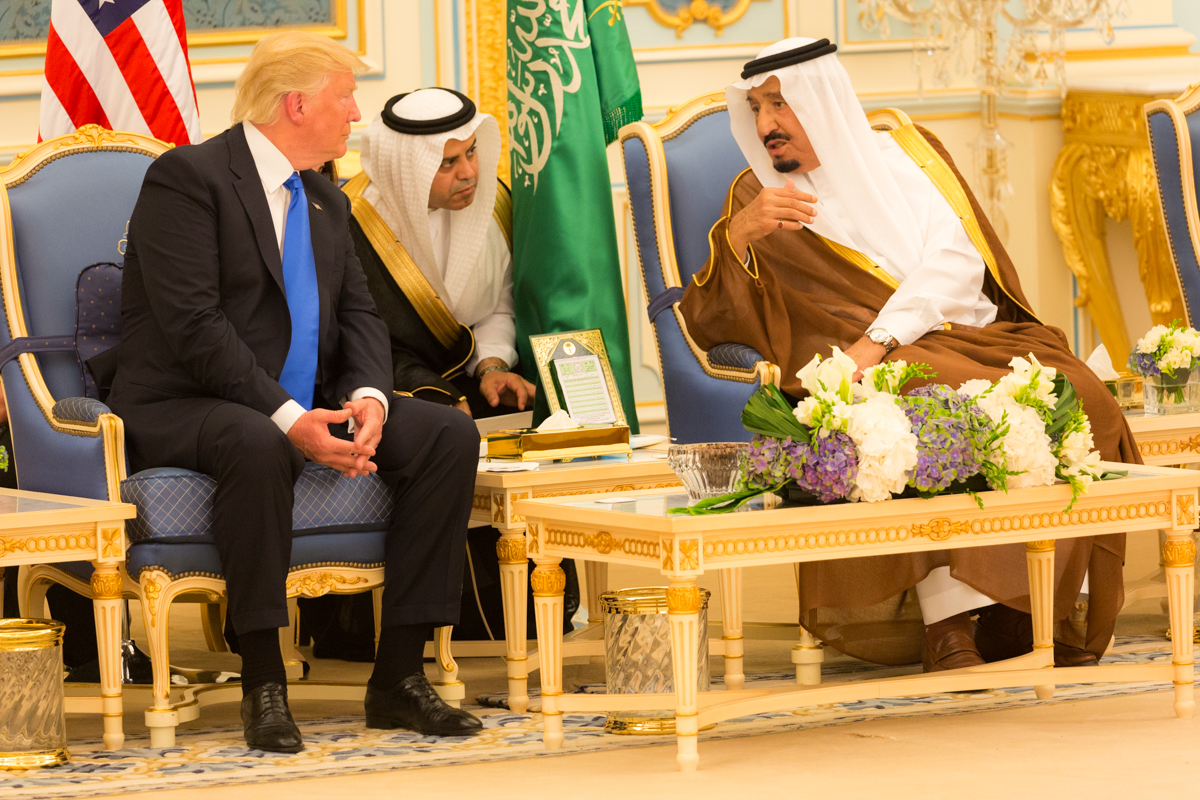
President Trump and King Salman talk during summit proceedings at the Al-Yamamah Palace in Riyadh on May 20.

President Trump made his first foreign trip to Saudi Arabia arriving at King Khalid International Airport on May 20, where he met with King Salman. Trump then traveled to the Murabba Palace, where the King awarded him the Collar of Abdulaziz Al Saud. Trump later visited the National Museum of Saudi Arabia. In the evening, Trump and the U.S. delegation took part in the traditional ardah sword dance.

=== Trade agreement and arms deal ===
On May 20, 2017, U.S. President Donald Trump signed a US$350 billion arms deal with the Kingdom of Saudi Arabia. The arms deal was the largest in world history. The transaction included tanks, combat ships missile defence systems, as well as radar, communications and cybersecurity technology. The transfer was widely seen as a counterbalance against the influence of Iran in the region. The arms transfer was described by news outlets as a "significant" and "historic" expansion of United States relations with Saudi Arabia.

== United States – Gulf Cooperation Council Summit ==
Trump met with GCC leaders the morning of May 21.

== Arab Islamic American Summit ==
Video of President Trump's speech at the Arab Islamic American Summit

King Salman and President Trump gave keynote addresses at the Arab Islamic American Summit. Trump called for Muslim leaders to "drive out" terrorism from their countries, and condemned Hamas and the Iranian government for their support of the government of Bashar al-Assad. Also speaking were President Abdel Fattah el-Sisi of Egypt, Emir Sabah Al-Ahmad Al-Jaber Al-Sabah of Kuwait, King Abdullah II of Jordan, President Joko Widodo of Indonesia, and Prime Minister Najib Razak of Malaysia.

At the close of the summit the leaders inaugurated the new Global Center for Combating Extremism in Riyadh, intended as a centre of excellence for fighting violent extremism which is conducive to terrorism, involving a number of international counter-extremism experts. To officially open the center King Salman, President Trump, and President el-Sisi placed their hands on a glowing orb in the shape of a globe, which was cause for mirth among the international media.

== Attendees ==
The map of the countries that participated in the summit

Key
| Summit co-chair |

| State | | Represented by | Title |
|---|---|---|---|
| (Afghanistan) | Afghanistan | Ashraf Ghani | President |
| (Albania) | Albania | Sami Shiba | Ambassador |
| (Algeria) | Algeria | Abdelkader Bensalah | President of the Council of the Nation |
| (Azerbaijan) | Azerbaijan | Ilham Aliyev | President |
| (Bahrain) | Bahrain | Hamad bin Isa Al Khalifa | King |
| (Bangladesh) | Bangladesh | Sheikh Hasina | Prime Minister |
| (Benin) | Benin | Patrice Talon | President |
| (Brunei) | Brunei | Hassanal Bolkiah | Sultan |
| (Burkina Faso) | Burkina Faso | Roch Marc Kabore | President |
| (Cameroon) | Cameroon | Lejeune Mbella Mbella | Minister of Foreign Affairs |
| (Chad) | Chad | Idriss Déby | President |
| (Comoros) | Comoros | Azali Assoumani | President |
| (Djibouti) | Djibouti | Ismaïl Omar Guelleh | President |
| (Egypt) | Egypt | Abdel Fattah el-Sisi | President |
| (Gabon) | Gabon | Ali Bongo Ondimba | President |
| (The Gambia) | Gambia | Adama Barrow | President |
| (Guinea) | Guinea | Alpha Condé | President |
| (Guinea-Bissau) | Guinea-Bissau | José Mário Vaz | President |
| (Guyana) | Guyana | David A. Granger | President |
| (Indonesia) | Indonesia | Joko Widodo | President |
| (Iraq) | Iraq | Fuad Masum | President |
| (Ivory Coast) | Ivory Coast | Alassane Ouattara | President |
| (Jordan) | Jordan | Abdullah II | King |
| (Kazakhstan) | Kazakhstan | Nursultan Nazarbayev | President |
| (Kuwait) | Kuwait | Sabah Al-Ahmad Al-Jaber Al-Sabah | Emir |
| (Kyrgyzstan) | Kyrgyzstan | Mukhammedkalyi Abylgaziev | First Deputy Prime Minister |
| (Lebanon) | Lebanon | Saad Hariri | Prime Minister |
| (Libya) | Libya | Fayez al-Sarraj | Prime Minister |
| (Malaysia) | Malaysia | Najib Razak | Prime Minister |
| (Maldives) | Maldives | Abdulla Yameen | President |
| (Mali) | Mali | Ibrahim Boubacar Keïta | President |
| (Mauritania) | Mauritania | Mohamed Ould Abdel Aziz | President |
| (Morocco) | Morocco | Nasser Bourita | Minister of Foreign Affairs |
| (Mozambique) | Mozambique | José Condungua Pacheco | Minister of Foreign Affairs |
| (Niger) | Niger | Mahamadou Issoufou | President |
| (Nigeria) | Nigeria | Mansur Dan Ali | Minister of Defence |
| (Oman) | Oman | Fahd bin Mahmoud al Said | Deputy Prime Minister |
| (Pakistan) | Pakistan | Nawaz Sharif | Prime Minister |
| (Palestine) | Palestinian Authority | Mahmoud Abbas | President |
| (Qatar) | Qatar | Tamim Bin Hamad Al Thani | Emir |
| (Saudi Arabia) | Saudi Arabia | Salman | King |
| (Senegal) | Senegal | Macky Sall | President |
| (Sierra Leone) | Sierra Leone | Ernest Bai Koroma | President |
| (Somalia) | Somalia | Mohamed Abdullahi Mohamed | President |
| (Sudan) | Sudan | Taha al-Hussein | Minister of State |
| (Suriname) | Suriname | Yldiz Pollack-Beighle | Minister of Foreign Affairs |
| (Tajikistan) | Tajikistan | Emomali Rahmon | President |
| (Togo) | Togo | Faure Gnassingbé | President |
| (Tunisia) | Tunisia | Beji Caid Essebsi | President |
| (Turkey) | Turkey | Mevlut Cavusoglu | Minister of Foreign Affairs |
| (Turkmenistan) | Turkmenistan | Raşit Meredow | Minister of Foreign Affairs |
| (Uganda) | Uganda | Henry Oryem Okello | State Minister of Foreign Affairs for International Affairs |
| (Uzbekistan) | Uzbekistan | Shavkat Mirziyoyev | President |
| (Yemen) | Yemen | Abdrabbuh Mansour Hadi | President |
| (United Arab Emirates) | United Arab Emirates | Mohammed bin Zayed Al Nahyan | Crown Prince of Abu Dhabi |
| (United States) | United States | Donald Trump | President |

=== Cancelled ===
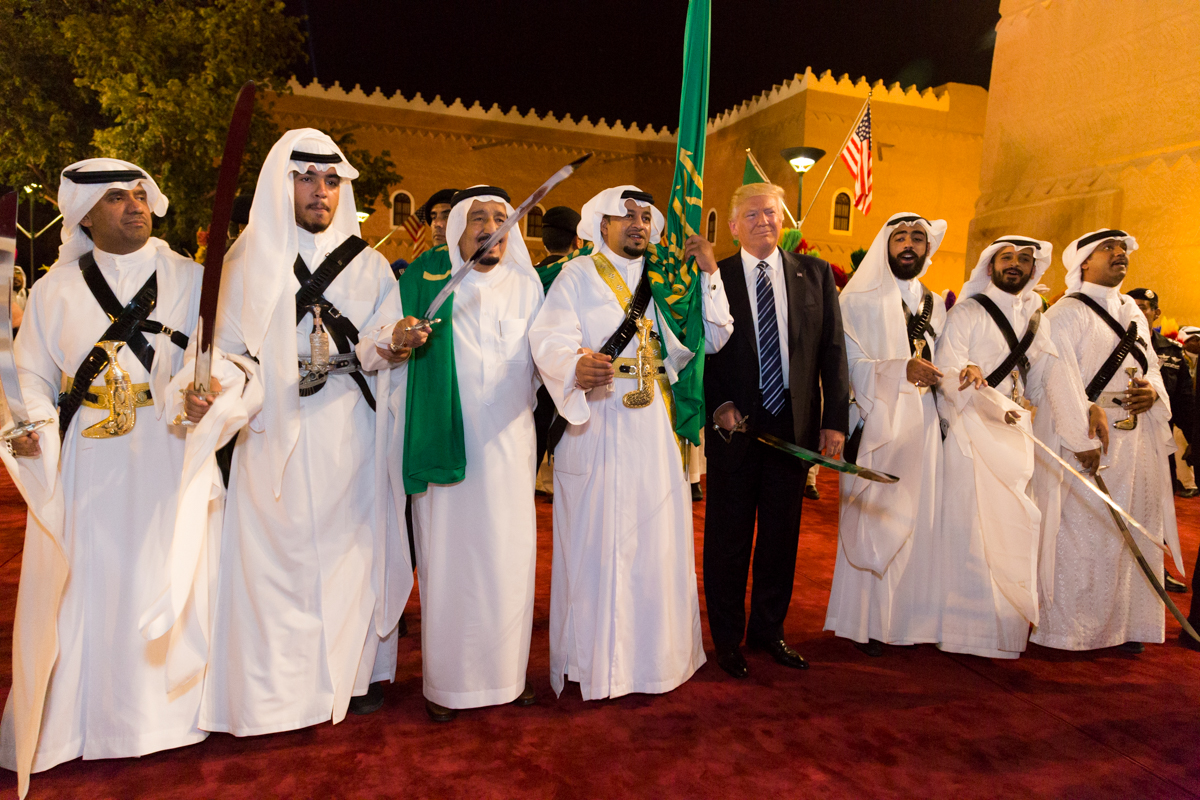
King Salman and President Trump take part in the traditional ardah dance at the Murabba Palace. The Iranian government would go on employ this as symbolic of US complicity for the Saudi-led group's actions in the Qatari crisis.

1. Morocco: King Mohammed VI was scheduled to attend but cancelled his plans a week prior to the summit for unspecified reasons.
2. Sudan: President Omar al-Bashir declined to attend after officials at the U.S. Embassy in Riyadh registered their objections to his planned attendance. President al-Bashir is wanted by the International Criminal Court for genocide, war crimes, and crimes against humanity.

== Aftermath ==
Emboldened by Trump's criticism of Iran, many Arab countries decided to take action against their perceived enemies. Bahrain began cracking down on its Shi'ite majority, killing 5 and arresting 286 people. Bahrain also shut down an independent newspaper and outlawed country's last opposition group.

On 5 June 2017, Saudi Arabia, UAE, Yemen, Egypt and Bahrain all announced they were cutting diplomatic ties with Qatar. Hamid Aboutalebi, deputy chief of staff of Iran's President Hassan Rouhani, tweeted, "What is happening is the preliminary result of the sword dance," referring to Trump's conduct at the Summit.

== Popular culture ==
An image of King Salman, U.S. President Trump, and Egyptian President el-Sisi touching an illuminated globe (see above) sparked a brief commotion on the Internet, particularly in Twitter. Users dubbed the globe "the Orb" and made reference to various popular culture objects, such as the Palantír from J. R. R. Tolkien's The Lord of the Rings series and "The Orb of Peace" from Star Wars: Episode I – The Phantom Menace. The Atlantic's James Parker later wrote that "Every presidency has iconic photographs. But there's nothing else like this one."

Noticing that Americans wanted to have their picture taken with the orb, the Saudi government gave it to the US embassy as a gift. The orb was initially put on display there, but ultimately put into storage.

== See also ==
- 2017 United States–Saudi Arabia arms deal
- Saudi Arabia–United States relations
- Islamic Military Counter Terrorism Coalition
- Impeachment inquiry into Donald Trump
- May 2025 visit by Donald Trump to the Middle East
