= Ritz-Carlton, Riyadh =

Hotel in Riyadh, Saudi Arabia

The Ritz-Carlton, Riyadh
- Location within Saudi Arabia

General information
- Location: Mekkah Road, AlHada Area، Al Hada, Riyadh 12912, Riyadh, Saudi Arabia
- Coordinates: 24.665646°N 46.628674°E
- Completed: 2011
- Affiliation: The Ritz-Carlton

Technical details
- Floor area: 62,000 square feet
- Grounds: 52 acres

Other information
- Number of rooms: 492

Website
- www.ritzcarlton.com/riyadh

The Ritz-Carlton, Riyadh (Arabic: فندق الريتز كارلتون بالرياض) is a luxury hotel in Riyadh, Saudi Arabia, which briefly served as a prison consequent to the 2017 Saudi Arabian purge.

== History ==
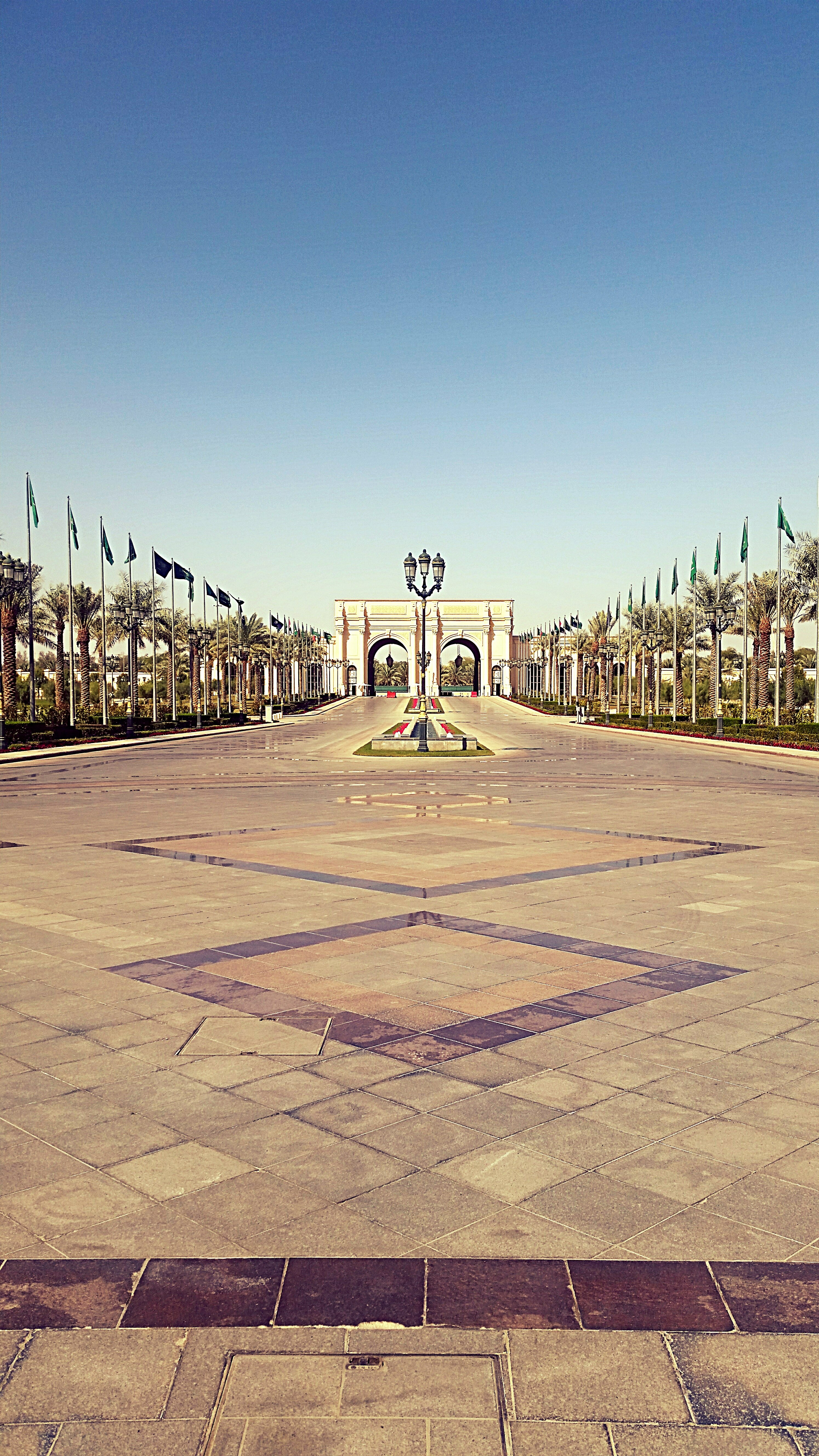
Hotel driveway

=== Prominent guests ===
Between 21–22 May 2017, President Donald Trump was a guest at the hotel as it hosted events for the 2017 Riyadh summit. He returned to the hotel for an overnight visit during his second term on 14-15 May, 2025 as the first stop on a four day visit to the Middle East.

Former President Barack Obama was a guest in 2014.

In October 2017, the hotel hosted the Future Investment Initiative with over 3,500 invitees.

=== Use as a detention center ===
From 4 November 2017 until February 2018, the hotel was closed to regular guests and become a detention center for those detained as part of the 2017 Saudi Arabian anti-corruption arrests. Guests staying at the hotel were notified that, “Due to unforeseen booking by local authorities which requires an elevated level of security, we are unable to accommodate guests until normal operations are restored.” Guests were ejected and no further bookings were accepted. A notice on the hotel's website read, "Due to unforeseen circumstances, the hotel’s internet and telephone lines are currently disconnected until further notice."
