= Mansour Al-Balawi =

Saudi Arabian businessman

- Born: 1964 (age 61–62); Jeddah, Saudi Arabia
- Title: Chairman of Al-Ittihad
- Term: June 2003 - November 2007

Mansour Al-Balawi (Arabic: منصور البلوي) (Full name: Mansour bin Hamdan bin Hamid al-Wayeou' al-Aradi al-Balawi, منصور بن حمدان بن حامد الوعيوع العرادي البلوي) (born 1964, Jeddah) is a Saudi businessman. He was the Chairman of Saudi sport club Al-Ittihad from 2003 to 2007, in a famous boom period where he contributed to the club's major domestic and international achievements. He is considered to be one of the richest people in Saudi Arabia, and has a variety of diverse companies and real estates which he inherited from his father.

== Biography ==
Mansour Al Balawi started his career at his father's companies. At a young age, he was a devoted football fan and had engaged in various sport activities. He joined Al-Ittihad as a member, and later became a board member under the chairmanship of Adnan Jamjoom. Al Balawi was elected the chairman of Al-Ittihad in June 2003. During his term, the club has made unprecedented achievements, most importantly winning the AFC Champions League two consecutive times, in 2004 and 2005.

Al Balawi resigned in November 25, 2007. The move was controversial and came shortly after Mohamed Kallon's decision to leave Al-Hilal in Riyadh to come to Jeddah and play for Al-Ittihad. In March 2021, it was rumored that he will run for chairmanship of Al Nasr but he denied it. Previously, he has mentioned in more than an occasion that he'll run again for Al-Ittihad's chairmanship, but never happened. Al-Balawai is an honorary member of nearly all prominent Saudi sport clubs, such as Al Nasr, Al Shabab, and Al Fateh. He is also an honorary member of Egyptian sport club Zamalek.

Al Balawi is part owner of SAB Holding (currently headed by his brother Sheikh Salah Al Bluewi). He also has investments in Egypt, including investments in Mövenpick resorts in Sharm El Sheikh.

On 4 November 2017, Al-Balway was arrested in Saudi Arabia in a "corruption crackdown" conducted by a new royal anti-corruption committee. Later he was released.

== Family ==
His father, Hamdan, was a businessman. His brother, Sheikh Salah Al Bluewi, is a businessman. His younger brother, Ibrahim Al-Balwai, was the chairman of Al-Ittihad from January 2015 to June 2016.
