= Human rights in Saudi Arabia =

Saudi Arabia is an absolute monarchy in which the king holds all legislative, executive, and judicial power. The concentration of authority in the monarchy has drawn international criticism for restrictions on political and civil liberties. Although the government has introduced social reforms in recent years, significant challenges remain regarding freedoms of expression, assembly, and political participation. The government is consistently ranked among the lowest-scoring countries in Freedom House's annual survey of political and civil rights. In 2023, it was ranked by the Varieties of Democracy Institute as the world's most authoritarian regime.

Saudi Arabia has for more than a decade retained the public relations firm Qorvis MSLGroup, a U.S. subsidiary of Publicis Groupe, to improve its international image. Human rights groups have accused the firm of helping the government whitewash its human rights record.

== Background ==
Saudi Arabia is an Islamic country which is based on Sharia. The 1992 Basic Law sets out the system of governance, rights of citizens, and powers and duties of the government, and it provides that the Quran and Sunnah (the traditions of Muhammad) serve as the country's constitution.

== Political Freedom ==
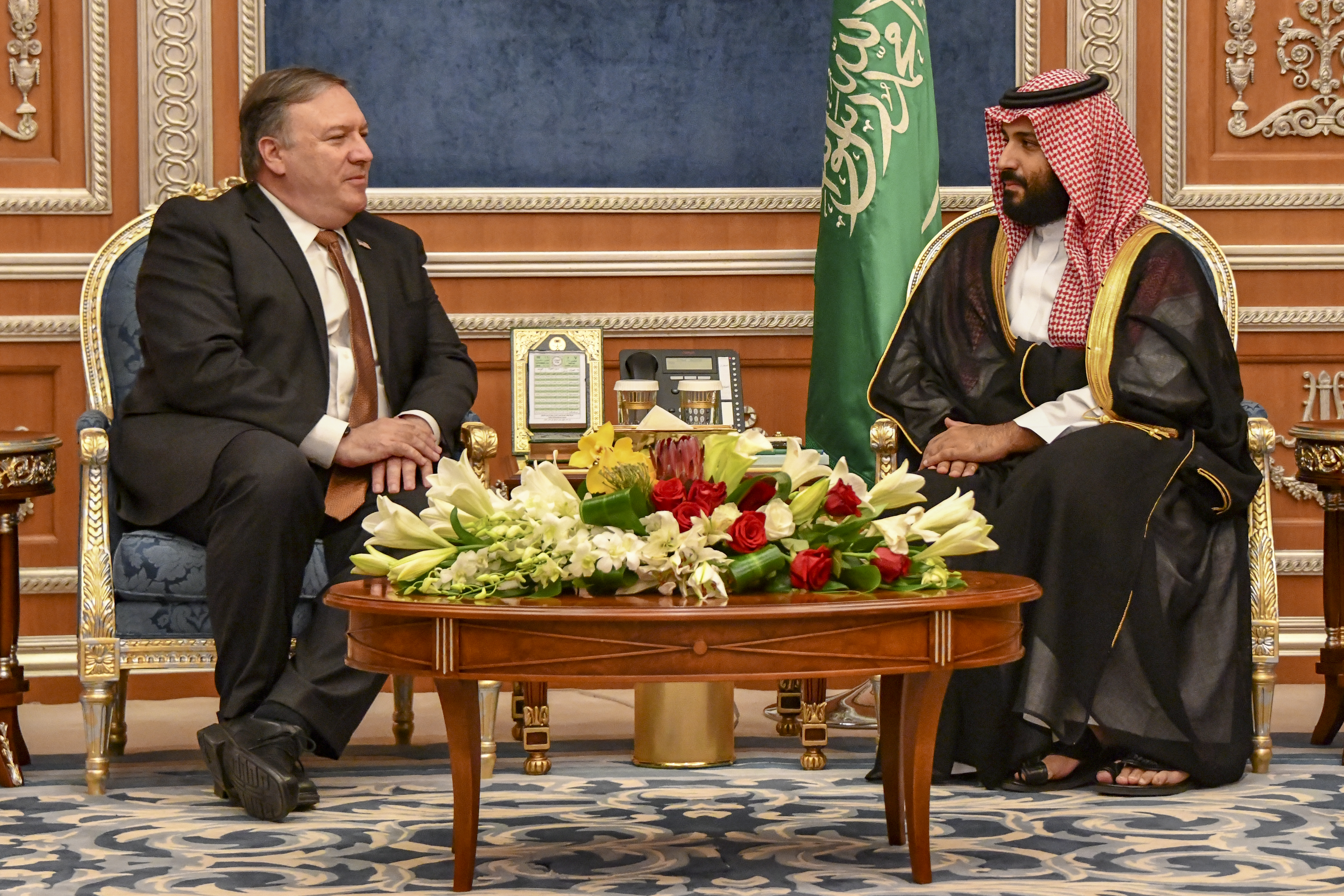
On 16 October 2018, Saudi Crown Prince Mohammad bin Salman met with U.S. Secretary of State Mike Pompeo to discuss the assassination of Jamal Khashoggi, who was a vocal critic of the Saudi regime.

The 1990s marked a slow period of political liberalization in the kingdom as the government created a written constitution, and the advisory Consultative Council, the latter being an appointed delegation of Saudi scholars and professionals who are allowed to advise the king. Some political dissidents were released from prison, after agreeing to disband their political parties. In 2005, adult male citizens were allowed to vote for some municipal seats, although plans for future elections, which may include adult women, have been put on hold indefinitely.

Political parties are banned, but some political dissidents were freed in the 1990s on the condition that they disband their political parties. Today, only the Green Party of Saudi Arabia remains, although it is an illegal organization. Trade unions are also banned, but the government has granted permission for Saudi citizens to form some private societies, which are allowed to do some humanitarian work within the kingdom.

Public demonstrations or any public act of dissent are forbidden. In April 2011, during the 2011–2012 Saudi Arabian protests, the kingdom made it a crime to publish any criticism harming the reputation of government or religious leaders, or which harms the interests of the state.

According to Human Rights Watch annual report 2016, Saudi Arabia continued to prosecute pro-reform activists and dissidents. Saudi Arabia's terrorism court sentenced Waleed Abu al-Khair, prominent activist, to 15 years. He was convicted on charges concerning his peaceful criticism of the human rights situation in his country. In July, authorities arrested Zuhair Kutbi, an activist, because of his discussion to a peaceful reform in media. In September 2015, all the founders of the banned Saudi Civil Political Rights Association (ACPRA) were jailed.

=== Political prisoners ===
Protests and sit-ins calling for political prisoners to be released took place during the 2011–2012 Saudi Arabian protests in many cities throughout Saudi Arabia, with security forces firing live bullets in the air on 19 August 2012 at a protest at al-Ha'ir Prison. As of 2012, recent estimates of the number of political prisoners in Mabahith prisons range from an estimate of zero by the Ministry of Interior to 30,000 by the UK-based Islamic Human Rights Commission and the BBC.

Allegedly, Khashoggi was not the only dissident on Saudi's list to be abducted. Another Saudi prince, Khaled bin Farhan al-Saud, living in exile in Germany, told The Independent that a similar kidnapping was planned against him by the Saudi authorities 10 days prior. "Over 30 times the Saudi authorities have told me to meet them in the Saudi embassy but I have refused every time. I know what can happen if I go into the embassy. Around 10 days before Jamal went missing they asked my family to bring me to Cairo to give me a cheque. I refused," said Saud. Five other royals, grandsons of King Abdul-Aziz, were detained, when they raised their voices about Khashoggi's disappearance.

In August 2018, a prominent Saudi cleric, Ahmed al-Amari, was detained by the Saudi authorities over the allegations of being associated with scholar and Saudi royal family critic Safar al-Hawali. Amari was held in solitary confinement since then. In January 2019, Amari died suffering a brain hemorrhage.

In November 2019, the Washington Post reported that about eight citizens of Saudi Arabia were detained within two weeks for making critical comments against the kingdom. Rights groups have condemned the act by calling it an escalation of an ongoing crackdown on dissent.

On 2 September 2020, the family of Saad al-Jabri revealed that Saudi Arabia had arrested Salem Almuzaini, the son-in-law of Saad al-Jabri, who accused Crown Prince Mohammed bin Salman of sending a hit squad to Canada to kill him.

On 28 December 2020, the Criminal Court in Riyadh sentenced a prominent Saudi women's rights activist to nearly two years in prison, drawing renewed attention to the kingdom's human rights abuses.

On 8 June 2021 Saudi court sentenced a Sudanese media personality and journalist, Ahmad Ali Abdelkader, 31, to four years in prison. This ruling against him came forth since his tweets and media interviews openly discussed and expressed support for Sudan's 2018-19 revolution, and criticized Saudi actions in Sudan and Yemen.

On 22 November 2021, Saudi authorities confirmed that they had detained Prince Salman (Ghazalan) Al Saud, and his father, Prince Abdulaziz bin Salman bin Muhammed, in an unofficial detention site without charges. The two men were arrested in January 2018 by a special Saudi security force, al-Saif al-Ajrab Brigade, as part of a broad purge of prominent royal family members, government officials, and influential business people, set up by Crown Prince Mohammed bin Salman. The father and son were disappeared in November 2020, and were held incommunicado until late October 2021. Abuses against the two men were documented, along with the conditions of their detention.

== Capital punishment ==
The death penalty is permitted in Saudi Arabia for such crimes as rape, murder, apostasy, sedition, sorcery, armed robbery, adultery and drug trafficking. While some of these crimes, such as premeditated murder, carry fixed punishments under Sharia law, other crimes such as drug-related offenses, are considered tazir, with neither the crime nor the punishment defined in Islam. In 2005, there were 191 executions; in 2006, 38; in 2007, 153; and in 2008, 102. Executions are usually carried out by beheading, although firing squads are sometimes used; Saudi Arabia is the only country in the world where beheading continues to be used as a method of execution.

A spokesman for the National Society for Human Rights, an organization which is funded by the Saudi monarchy, said that the number of executions is rising because crime rates are rising, that prisoners are treated humanely, and that the beheadings deter crime, saying, "Allah, our creator, knows best what's good for His people...Should we just think of and preserve the rights of the murderer and not think of the rights of others?"

Saudi Arabian police and immigration authorities routinely abuse people who are stopped or detained, especially workers from developing countries. Earlier in November 2013, the authorities received criticism for the way they have planned and handled the crackdown on illegal workers. Saudi authorities – in some cases with the help of citizens – rounded up many illegal workers and physically abused them.

On 23 April 2019, Saudi Arabia carried out mass executions of 37 imprisoned civilians who had been convicted mostly on the basis of confessions obtained under torture or written by the accused's torturers. Most of the executed belonged to the country's Shia minority.

In April 2020, the Saudi Supreme Court announced under a royal decree by King Salman that minors who commit crimes will no longer face the death sentence, but will be sentenced up to 10 years imprisonment in a juvenile detention facility.

In November 2021, sixteen British MPs and peers urged foreign secretary Liz Truss to intervene and stop Saudi Arabia from sentencing the Saudi scholar Hassan al-Maliki to death. Al-Maliki has been behind bars since 2017 on multiple charges, including "conducting interviews with western news outlets" and "owning books" that are unauthorized by the Saudi government. He was held incommunicado and in solitary confinement for three months. Labor MP Andy Slaughter said the treatment of the prominent academic was "totally incompatible with the reforms espoused by crown prince Mohammed bin Salman."

In November 2022, human rights organizations said Saudi Arabia resumed secret executions for drug offenses. In 2018, Crown Prince Mohammed bin Salman had vowed to "minimize" capital punishment. The regime had said that only those found guilty of a murder or of manslaughter will be sentenced to death. However, November 2022 reports revealed that the authorities executed 17 people in 10 days over non-violent drug charges. It included seven Saudis, four Syrians, three Pakistanis and three Jordanians. The executions, mainly by beheading with a sword, brought the total of executions for 2022 to at least 137. It exceeded the combined number of executions in 2020 and 2021. The UN was unsure how many more people were on a death row. However, the European Saudi Organisation for Human Rights (ESOHR) said nearly 54 more people, including eight minors, were on death row.

In 2025 Saudi Arabia has broken its record for executions for the second year in a row. At least 347 people were executed that year. This is higher than the 345 executions recorded in 2024, according to Reprieve, a campaign group based in the UK that monitors executions in Saudi Arabia and represents people on death row.

== Corporal punishment ==
One of about 30 countries in the world with judicial corporal punishment, Saudi Arabia permits amputations of hands and feet for robbery, and flogging was permitted until 2020 for lesser crimes such as "sexual deviance" and drunkenness. The number of lashes is not clearly prescribed by law and varies according to the discretion of judges, and ranges from dozens of lashes to several hundred, usually applied over a period of weeks or months. At least five defendants were sentenced to flogging of 1,000 to 2,500 lashes. In the 2000s, it was reported that women were sentenced to lashes for adultery; the women were actually victims of rape, but because they could not prove who the perpetrators were, they were deemed guilty of committing adultery. In 2004, the United Nations Committee Against Torture criticized Saudi Arabia for such amputations and floggings; the Saudi delegation decried this "interference" in its legal system and defended 1,400-year-old "legal traditions" held since the inception of Islam. In 2009, Mazen Abdul-Jawad was sentenced to 1,000 lashes and five years in prison for bragging on a Saudi TV show about his sexual exploits.

In 2014, Saudi blogger Raif Badawi's sentence was increased to 1,000 lashes and ten years' imprisonment after he was accused of apostasy in 2012. The lashes were due to take place over 20 weeks. The first round (50) were administered on 9 January 2015, but the second round has been postponed due to medical problems. The case was internationally condemned and put a considerable amount of pressure on the Saudi legal system.

In October 2015, UK pensioner and cancer victim Karl Andree, then 74, faced 360 lashes for home brewing alcohol. His family feared the punishment could kill him. However, he was released and returned home in November that year.

In 2016, a Saudi man was sentenced to 2,000 lashes, ten years in prison and a fine of 20,000 riyals (US$5,300) for making tweets critical of Islam, and denying the existence of God.

In September 2018, the official Twitter account of the Saudi Arabia prosecutors warned that people who share anything satirical on social media that "affects public order, religious values and public morals" would receive a five-year prison term and a fine of 3 million riyals (US$800,000). Several intellectuals, businessmen and activists were arrested on such charges.

In April 2020, the Saudi Supreme Court abolished the flogging punishment from its system and replaced it with jail time and fines.

== Torture ==
While Saudi Arabia's Criminal Procedure Code prohibits "torture" and "undignified treatment" (art. 2), in practice, torture and using torture to extract forced confessions of guilt remains common.

According to Amnesty International, security forces continued to torture and ill-treat detainees to extract confessions to be used as evidence against them at trial. According to the organization, 32 defendants accused of spying for Iran were subjected to torture and forced to confess. Detainees were held incommunicado and denied access to their families.

In 2018, a UN panel that visited Saudi Arabia on the kingdom's invitation to conduct an inspection, revealed that the country has been systematically using anti-terror laws to justify torture. The report found that Saudis, who have been exercising their right to freedom of expression peacefully and calmly in the kingdom, have been systematically persecuted by the authorities.

Walid Fitaihi, a physician born in Jeddah in 1964, returned to Saudi Arabia in 2006 after studying and working in the US for two decades. He was arrested at the Ritz-Carlton hotel in November 2017 and moved to Al-Ha'ir Prison south of the capital. The Ritz-Carlton was used to hold many of the prominent prisoners of the Saudi government in 2017, according to Saudi activists. Al Jazeera reported, Fitaihi told a friend that he was "blindfolded, stripped of his underwear and bound to a chair". The daily report also said that the Saudi government tortured him with electric shocks, "what appears to have been a single session of torture that lasted about an hour". Reports also said he was whipped so severely that he could not sleep on his back for days.

In August 2019, a news article released in The Independent reported that more than 100 female migrants of Bangladeshi descent and some 45 male migrants fled from Saudi Arabia following psychological and sexual harassment from employers.

On 19 November 2020, The Independent reported human rights violations endured by women's rights activists and political prisoners in Saudi Arabian jails, based on a report by the Grant Liberty organization. Reportedly, women's rights activists and political prisoners have been sexually assaulted, tortured, and killed in Saudi Arabian detention cells. According to the research, 20 prisoners were arrested for political crimes, five of whom had already been put to death, while the remaining 13 face the death penalty. The report was released days before Saudi Arabia hosted the 2020 G20 Summit, which had female empowerment prominently on its agenda.

== Freedom of press and communication ==
According to Human Rights Watch, Saudi Arabia continued to repress pro-reform activists and peaceful dissidents in 2017.

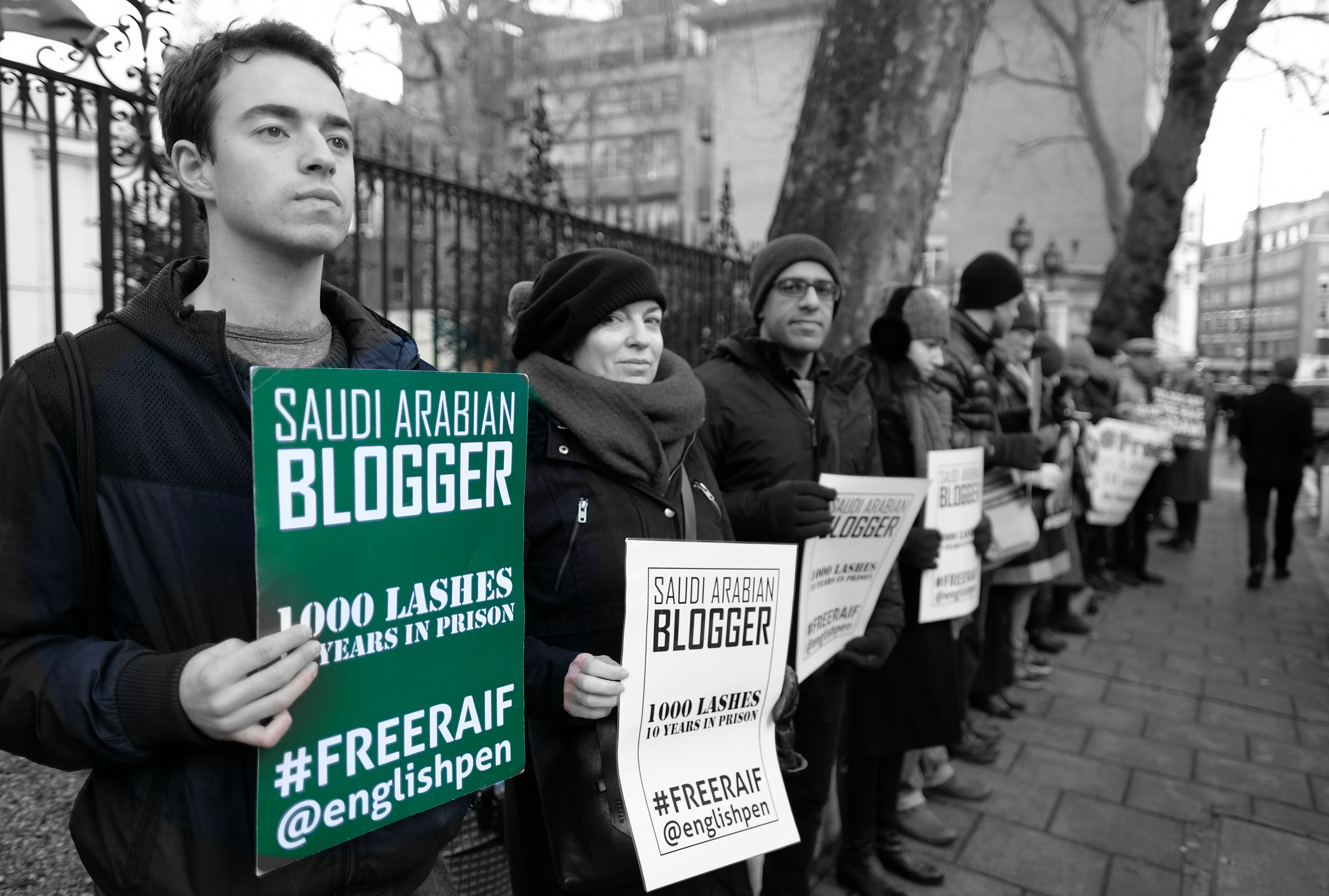
A protest outside the Saudi Arabian Embassy in London against detention of Raif Badawi, 13 January 2017

Speech, the press and other forms of communicative media, including television and radio broadcasting and Internet reception, are actively censored by the government to prevent political dissent and anything deemed, by the government, to be offensive to Wahhabi culture or Islamic morality.

In 2008, a prominent Saudi blogger and reformist, Fouad al-Farhan, was jailed for posting comments online that were critical of Saudi business, religious and media figures, signifying a move by the government to step up its censorship of the Internet within its borders. He was released on 26 April 2008.

Online social media has increasingly come under government scrutiny for dealing with the "forbidden" topics. In 2010 a Saudi man was fined and given jail time for his sexually suggestive YouTube video production. That same year another man was also jailed and ordered to pay a fine for boasting about his sex life on television.

D+Z, a magazine focused on development, reports that hundreds were arrested in order to limit freedom of expression. Many of these individuals were held without trial and in secret. The torture of these prisoners was also found to be prevalent.

On 17 December 2012, blogger Raif Badawi was charged with apostasy, which carries the death penalty. Badawi is the editor and co-founder of Free Saudi Liberals, a website for religious discussion. The organization Human Rights Watch has called for charges against him to be dropped. He had been sentenced to seven years in prison and 600 lashes for "insulting Islam", but this sentence was changed to 1,000 lashes, 10 years in prison, and additionally a fine of 1,000,000 Saudi riyals. The lashes are due to be administered every Friday for 20 weeks, 50 lashes at a time, but have not continued past the first flogging. The second flogging has been postponed more than twelve times; previous postponements were for health reasons, but the reason behind the most recent postponement is unknown.

Saudi novelist and political analyst Turki al-Hamad was arrested 24 December 2012 after a series of tweets on religion and other topics. The arrest was ordered by Saudi Interior Minister Prince Muhammad bin Nayef; however the charges against al-Hamad were not announced. He has since been freed.

In 2014 and 2015, a team of Saudi agents allegedly infiltrated Twitter and stole proprietary and sensitive personal data from the American social media platform, in order to unmask anonymous dissidents of Saudi Arabia.

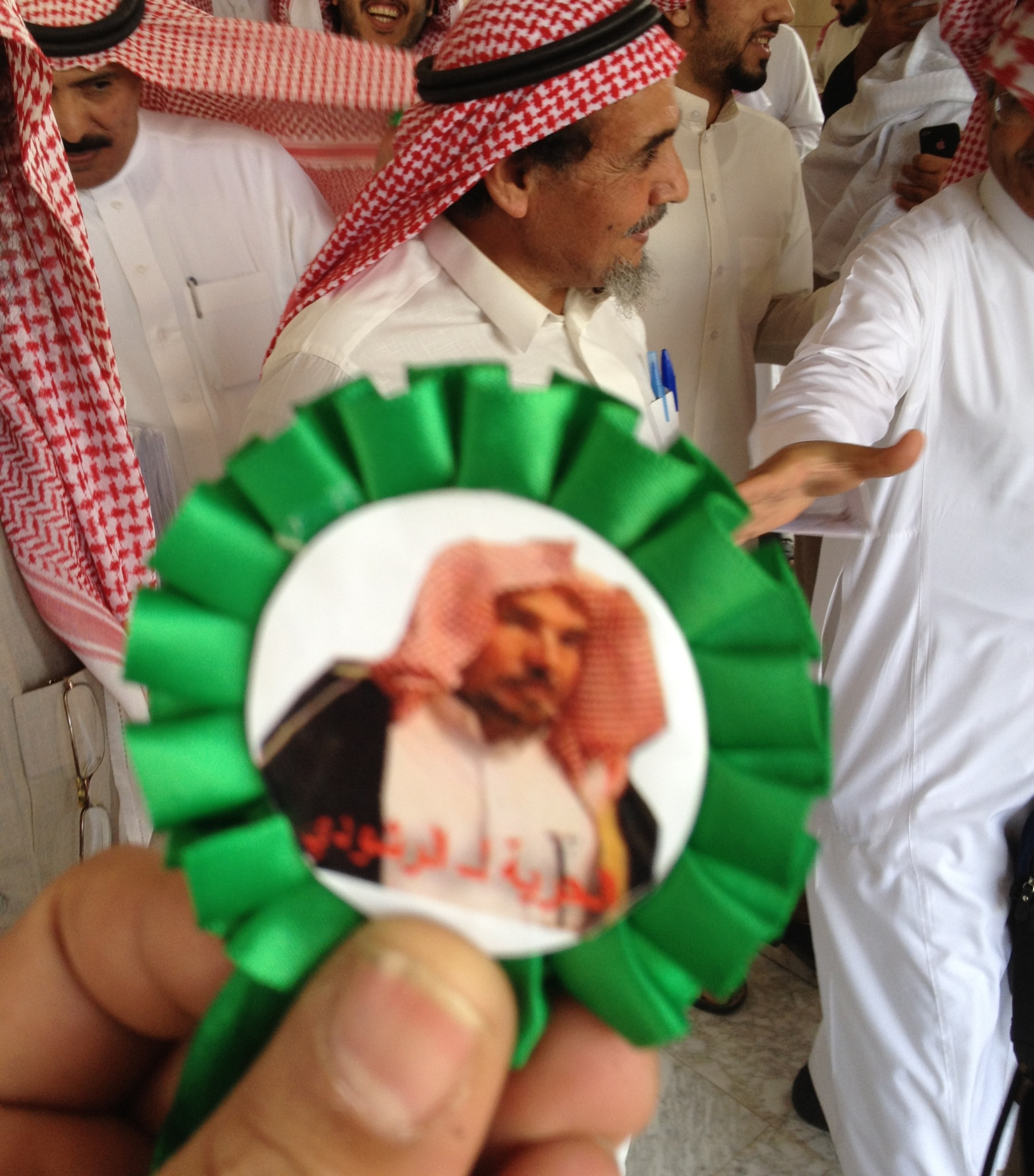
Abdullah al-Hamid was imprisoned seven times for supporting the establishment of a constitutional monarchy in Saudi Arabia. He had been serving an 11-year jail sentence from 2013 until his death in April 2020.

In July 2015, Waleed Abulkhair, a prominent human rights lawyer, founder of Monitor of Human Rights in Saudi Arabia and recipient of 2012 of the Palm prize for human rights, was sentenced to 15 years of prison by a special criminal court in Riyadh for vague offenses such as "setting up an unlicensed organization".

On 17 November 2015, Ashraf Fayadh, a Palestinian poet and contemporary artist, was sentenced to death for committing apostasy. Fayadh was detained by the country's religious police in 2013 in Abha, in southwest Saudi Arabia, and then rearrested and tried in early 2014. He was accused of having promoted atheism in his 2008 book of poems Instructions Within. However, the religious police failed to prove that his poetry was atheist propaganda and Fayadh's supporters believe he is being punished by hardliners for posting a video online showing a man being lashed in public by the religious police in Abha. Adam Coogle, a Middle East researcher for Human Rights Watch, said Fayadh's death sentence showed Saudi Arabia's "complete intolerance of anyone who may not share government-mandated religious, political and social views".

On 15 July 2015, Saudi Arabian writer and commentator Zuhair Kutbi was sentenced to four years in prison without clear charges following an interview at the Rotana Khaleejia TV channel in which he discussed his ideas for peaceful reform in Saudi Arabia to become a constitutional monarchy, and talked about combatting religious and political repression. Kutbi's lawyer and son said half the sentence was suspended, but that he was also banned from writing for 15 years and travelling abroad for 5 years, and fined US$26,600.

In February 2017, Human Rights Watch issued a report regarding the violation of freedom of speech in Saudi Arabia. According to the report, since 2010, at least 20 prominent Saudi dissidents were sentenced to a long prison term or a travel ban for some years; the offenses ranged from breaking allegiance with the ruling family to participating in protests demanding rights be respected. According to the report, the government has been trying to silence people expressing dissenting views regarding religion, politics, and human rights. On 17 April 2011, Nadhir al-Majed, a prominent 39-year-old writer, was arrested at school and detained for 15 months. On 18 January 2017, he was sentenced to seven years in prison and a seven-year travel ban; he has also not been permitted to call his family or receive visits. The conviction was based on "his participation in protests in 2011 over discrimination against Shia" and "his communication with international media and human rights organizations", supporting the right of Shia in the country. On 10 January, Abdulaziz al-Shubaily, a human rights activist, was re-sentenced to eight years in prison, an eight-year ban on using social media after his release and an eight-year travel ban; the charges included "his incitement against the government and judiciary" as well as "his communication with international agencies against his government". He remains free on bail, however. On 8 January, Essam Koshak, 45, was detained without charge; he used social media to highlight Saudi Arabia's repression of dissident writers, activists, and advocates for their release. Since 2014, nearly all Saudi dissidents have been sentenced to a long jail term based on their activism in addition to arrest of all the activists associated with the Saudi Civil and Political Rights Association, which was dissolved in March 2013.

In September 2018, the Right Livelihood Award awarded three jailed Saudi human rights activists with the "alternative Nobel prize" award. Abdullah al-Hamid, Mohammad Fahad al-Qahtani and Waleed Abu al-Khair were jointly awarded one million kronor cash award "for their visionary and courageous efforts, guided by universal human rights principles, to reform the totalitarian political system in Saudi Arabia". As of September 2018, al-Hamid and al-Qahtani, founding members of the Saudi Civil and Political Rights Association, were serving prison sentences of 11 and 10 years respectively, according to the charges for "providing inaccurate information to foreign media, founding and operating an unlicensed human rights organization"; while al-Khair, a lawyer and activist, was serving a sentence of 15 years for "disobeying the ruler".

In 2018, a Saudi American journalist, Jamal Khashoggi was murdered inside a foreign embassy. He was a critic of Saudi Arabia. In June 2019, a 101-page report by the OHCHR accused the kingdom of Saudi Arabia for the premeditated assassination of Jamal Khashoggi. The same year, British media group, The Guardian, claimed that it was being targeted by a cybersecurity unit in Saudi Arabia. The unit was directed to hack into the email accounts of the journalists probing into the various crises involving the royal court. The claim was made based on what is said to be a confidential internal order, signed in the name of Saud al-Qahtani, a close aide of the crown prince Mohammed bin Salman also named in the murder of Khashoggi.

In March 2020, The Guardian revealed that Saudi Arabia had been allegedly spying on its citizens in the US. The British media cited that the nation has been readily exploiting the weakness in global mobile telecom network called SS7, and informed that the data reviewed by them shows millions of covert tracking requests for the US location of Saudi-registered phones since November 2019.

On 9 April 2020, prominent human rights activist Abdullah al-Hamid died in the prison after suffering a stroke. He was the founder of Saudi Civil and Political Rights Association and was arrested in 2013 for a peaceful protest.

In January 2021, Salma al-Shehab, a Saudi student at Leeds University, was arrested while visiting Saudi Arabia for holidays. In August 2022, she was given 34-year prison sentence for following and retweeting dissidents and activists on Twitter. Some of her tweets appeared to show support for Loujain al-Hathloul, a Saudi women's rights activist who was imprisoned by Saudi Arabia earlier and was tortured. Later in August 2022, a woman named Nourah bint Saeed al-Qahtani was sentenced to 45 years in prison for "using the internet to tear [Saudi Arabia's] social fabric". Democracy for the Arab World Now connected these harsh prison sentences with US president Joe Biden's visit to Jeddah in July 2022.

== Women's rights ==
=== Guardianship system, segregation, and restrictions ===
Saudi women face discrimination in many aspects of their lives, such as the justice system, and under the male guardianship system are effectively treated as legal minors. Although they make up 70% of those enrolled in universities, for social reasons, women make up 5% of the workforce in Saudi Arabia, the lowest proportion in the world. The treatment of women has been referred to as "sex segregation", "gender apartheid", and of some women being "prisoners" of their male relatives. Implementation of a government resolution supporting expanded employment opportunities for women met resistance from within the labor ministry, from the religious police, and from the male citizenry.

In many parts of Saudi Arabia, it is believed that a woman's place is in the home caring for her husband and family, yet there are some women who do not adhere to this view and practice, and some run the house instead of the husband himself. Moreover, there is also some type of segregation at homes, such as different entrances for men and women.

Women's rights are at the heart of calls for reform in Saudi Arabia – calls that are challenging the kingdom's political status quo. Local and international women's groups are also pushing governments to respond, taking advantage of the fact that some rulers are eager to project a more progressive image to the West. Since 2009, women and their male supporters have been organizing an anti male-guardianship campaign. Female leaders of this movement have been imprisoned without charge. Women in general who challenge the guardianship system may be sent to shelters for troubled women, where according to human rights activists they face torture and sexual abuse. Men are free to abuse women in Saudi Arabia, with reports of women being locked in their rooms for months or threatened with starvation or shooting for offenses such as getting the wrong kind of haircut or being in a relationship with a man the family has not approved. Women cannot file police reports without the permission of a male guardian, and may end up being imprisoned by the government for complaining. Women are prohibited from certain professions (such as optometry) and may be prohibited from mixing with men at work, but according to the government as of 2017 compose 30% of workers in the private sector (which is 40% of GDP).

The presence of powerful businesswomen—still a rare sight—in some of these groups helps get them heard. Prior to 2008, women were not allowed to enter hotels and furnished apartments without a chaperone or mahram. With a 2008 Royal Decree, however, the only requirement for a woman to be allowed to enter hotels is a national ID card, and (as with male guests) the hotel must inform the nearest police station of their room reservation and length of stay. In April 2010, a new, optional ID card for women was issued which allows them to travel in countries of the Gulf Cooperation Council. The cards include GPS tracking, fingerprints and features that make them difficult to forge. Women do not need male permission to apply for the card, but do need it to travel abroad. Proponents argue that new female identity cards enable a woman to carry out her activities with ease, and prevent forgeries committed in the name of women.

Women first joined the Consultative Assembly of Saudi Arabia in 2013, occupying thirty seats. Furthermore, that year three women were named as deputy chairpersons of three committees. Thurayya Obeid was named Deputy Chairwoman of the Human Rights and Petitions Committee, Zainab Abu Talib, Deputy Chairwoman of the Information and Cultural Committee, and Lubna Al-Ansari, Deputy Chairwoman of the Health Affairs and Environment Committee.

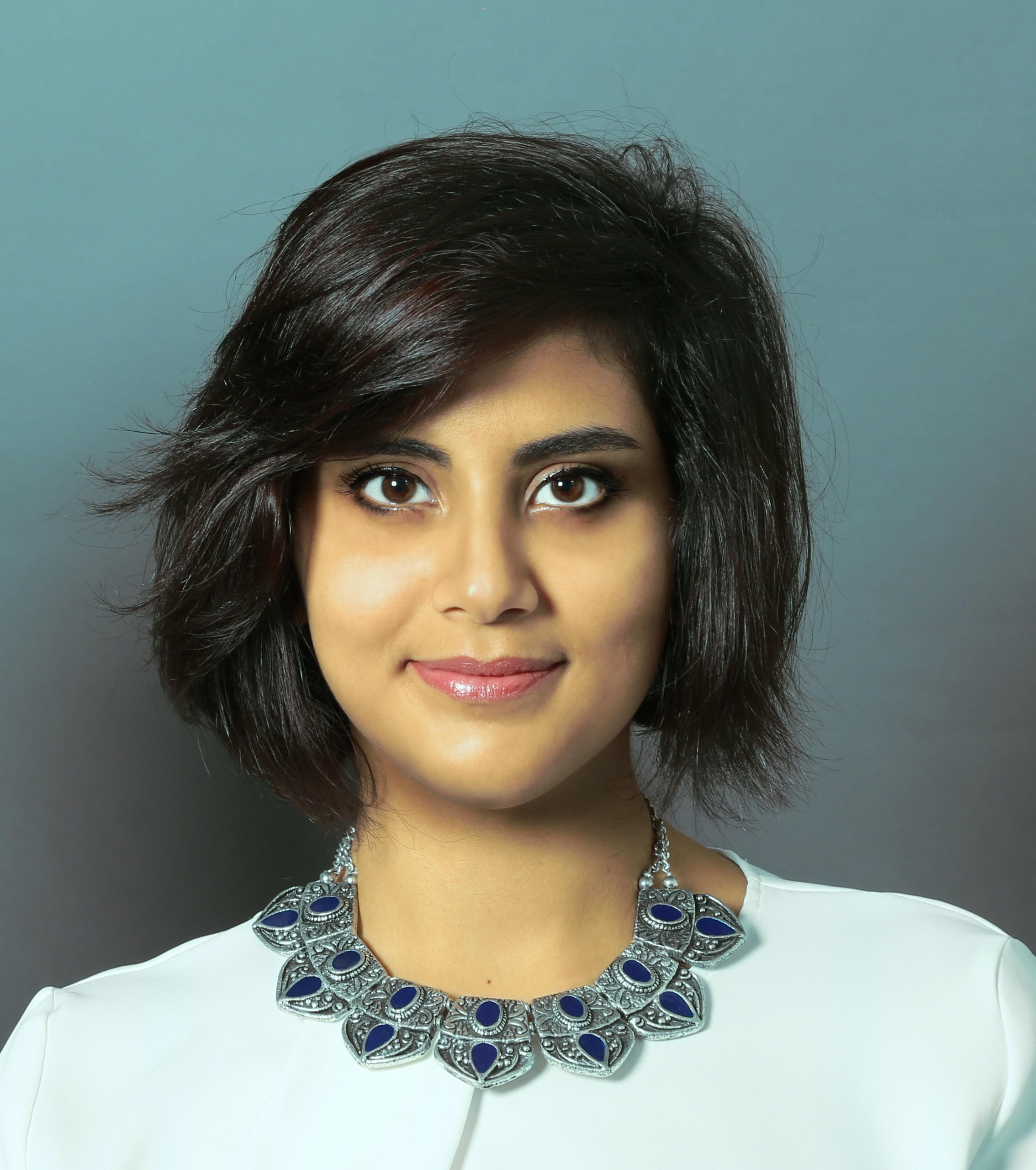
Women's rights activist Loujain al-Hathloul was arrested in May 2018

In 2013 the Directorate General of Passports allowed Saudi women married to foreigners to sponsor their children, so that the children can have residency permits (iqamas) with their mothers named as the sponsors, and have the right to work in the private sector in Saudi Arabia while on the sponsorship of their mothers, and the mother can also bring her children who are living abroad back to Saudi Arabia if they have no criminal records. Foreign men married to Saudi women were also granted the right to work in the private sector in Saudi Arabia while on the sponsorship of their wives on condition that the title on their iqamas should be written as "husband of a Saudi wife" and that they should have valid passports enabling them to return to their homes at any time. Saudi women married to foreigners, however, still face difficulty in passing their nationality to their children.

Also in 2013, Saudi Arabia registered its first female trainee lawyer, Arwa al-Hujaili. In Saudi courts, the testimony of women is weighted half that of a man's.

According to the CIA world factbook, the female literacy rate is 82.2%, in comparison to 90.8% male literacy rate.

In the year 2018, the Saudi government changed several policies, allowing women to drive with the permission of their guardian, attend sporting events in gender-segregated areas, participate in sports (including exercising on public streets), and eliminated the need for male permission to receive education, get healthcare, or open a business. It began offering physical education for girls and said it would start licensing female-only gyms. The government opened the military to women in March, who can serve if they meet certain physical and educational requirements, continue to live with their male guardian in the province of service, and get male permission. It also granted divorced women the ability to retain custody of children without petitioning. Male permission is still required to apply for a passport, travel, marry, divorce, or leave jail. Men and women are also still segregated on public transport, beaches, and pools. In practice, some doctors still require male permission before providing services, and male permission may be needed to rent an apartment or file a legal claim. In 2019, the Saudi government took new measures to release male guardianship. Thus, women would be allowed to travel abroad without the need to obtain the permission from their male guardians.

In July 2018, two prominent female human rights activists, Samar Badawi and Nassima al-Sada, were arrested for challenging Saudi Arabia's male guardianship laws. According to Amnesty International, several arrested women's rights activists detained without charge in Dhahban Prison are enduring torture by electrocution, flogging, hanging from the ceiling, and sexual assault.

In October 2018, under the predominant male guardianship system, a Saudi woman lost a legal battle to marry the man she wanted to because he played a musical instrument, many conservative Muslims in the kingdom consider music to be "haram" (forbidden). The male relative of the woman did not allow her to marry the man of her choice citing religious incompatibility as the man played oud.

Saudi Arabia is not a party to the International Covenant on Economic, Social and Cultural Rights, which among many other issues prohibits forced marriages. However, it is part of the Human Rights council.

The World Economic Forum in its Global Gender Gap Report 2018 ranked Saudi Arabia 141 out of 149 countries on gender equality.

In 2019, the government also stated that women can start working in the military. In the past they could only work in police.

On 30 November 2020, seven European human rights ambassadors criticized Saudi Arabia over the continued detention of at least five women's rights activists, including Loujain al-Hathloul, whose case was referred to a special court for terrorism offenses in that month. On 25 November 2020, Loujain appeared in a Saudi court, as her trial was scheduled to start after 900 days in pre-trial detention. However, the court instead referred the case to the Specialized Criminal Court for terrorism and national security cases.

In February 2021, Saudi women were granted permission to join military and army professional fields. Women in Saudi Arabia can now be employed as soldiers, lance corporals, corporals, sergeants, and staff sergeants.

However, an investigation by The Guardian newspaper in 2025 found that the Dar al-Reaya, officially "care homes", continued to be effectively "jails" for women whose families wish to institutionalize them for disobedience, extramarital sexual relations or being absent from home. Some women are sent to Dar al-Reaya to protect a family's reputation after a woman is sexually abused by a brother or father. Treatment was reported to be "hellish": very harsh, with solitary confinement, flogging, and no visits or contact.

=== Driving ===
Saudi Arabia was the only country in the world where women were forbidden to drive motor vehicles until June 2018. The motoring ban was not in statute law, but was an "informal" religious fatwa imposed by conservative Muslim clerics in order to maintain the country's tradition of gender segregation, although this religious view has changed in recent years.

In 1990, when 47 Saudi women drove cars through the streets of Riyadh in protest against the ban, the protestors were punished and it was reported that "...all the drivers, and their husbands, were barred from foreign travel for a year. Those women who had government jobs were fired, once their employers found out. And from hundreds of mosque pulpits, they were denounced by name as immoral women out to destroy Saudi society."

When the driving ban was enforced, women complained that "we can't move around without a male". Many could not afford chauffeurs, and the few buses that do operate in cities and towns across the Kingdom do not follow a set schedule. On 26 October 2013, a group of women started a movement to defy the ban by driving themselves. However, on 23 October, in a "rare and explicit restating of the ban", Interior Ministry Spokesman General Mansur al-Turki warned: "It is known that women in Saudi are banned from driving and laws will be applied against violators and those who demonstrate support." In December 2014, two women were arrested and sentenced to almost a month of prison for defying the female driving ban.

Women are allowed to fly aircraft, though they must be chauffeured to the airport. A Saudi woman made news in 2007 when she became the first woman to get her pilot's license. The woman, Hanadi al-Hindi works for Saudi Prince Al Waleed.

Hisham Fageeh, a Saudi living in the US, has created a video which makes a reference to the Government's rules which prevented women from driving. The video was released the same day many women in Saudi Arabia staged a nationwide protest against the Government.

In 2015, a Saudi woman working in neighboring UAE was arrested as she tried to enter Saudi Arabia. She had her passport taken from her and was forced to wait at the Saudi-UAE border without any food or water. She claimed that her UAE drivers license was valid in all GCC countries, but the Saudi border authorities refused to acknowledge its legitimacy.

In 2017, a royal decree was issued to allow women to drive. The first driving license was issued to a Saudi woman in June 2018 and the ban on driving was lifted on 24 June 2018. Between the announcement and the lifting of the ban, the leaders of the Women to Drive campaign who violated the ban were arrested and tortured.

Male permission is still required to travel outside the home, so many women in conservative families are still not allowed to drive.

== LGBTQ rights ==
Same-sex sexual activity is illegal in Saudi Arabia under Sharia and is punishable by imprisonment, flogging, or the death penalty. There is no legal recognition of LGBTQ rights. Transgender people may also face prosecution for violating gender norms or dress codes. In March 2017, Pakistani activists alleged that two transgender women from Pakistan were tortured to death by Saudi police following a raid in Riyadh in which 35 transgender people were arrested. Saudi authorities denied the reports, stating that no one had been tortured and that one Pakistani national had died of a heart attack while in custody.

Doctors in Saudi Arabia are prohibited from providing hormone replacement therapy or other gender-affirming medical treatments to transgender people. Official guidelines issued by a Ministry of Health-affiliated committee classify gender dysphoria as a mental illness and direct physicians to offer only psychological treatment.

== Human trafficking ==
Saudi Arabia is a notable destination country for men and women trafficked for the purposes of slave labor and commercial sexual exploitation. Men and women from Central Asia, the Middle East, and Africa, and many other countries voluntarily travel to Saudi Arabia as domestic servants or other low-skilled laborers, but some subsequently face conditions indicative of involuntary servitude.

Women, primarily from Asian and African countries are trafficked into Saudi Arabia for commercial sexual exploitation; others were kidnapped and forced into prostitution after running away from abusive employers.

Some Saudi men have also used contracted "temporary marriages" in countries such as Mauritania, Yemen, and Indonesia as a means by which to sexually exploit migrant workers. Women are led to believe they are being wed in earnest, but upon arrival in Saudi Arabia subsequently become their husbands' sexual slaves, are forced into domestic labor and, in some cases, prostitution. Prostitution is illegal in Saudi Arabia.

== Racism ==
Racism in Saudi Arabia extends to allegations of imprisonment, physical abuse, rape, overwork and wage theft, especially of foreign workers who are given little protections under the law.

=== Antisemitism ===
During the Gulf War (1990–1991), when approximately a half million U.S. military personnel assembled in Saudi Arabia, and many were then stationed there, there were many Jewish U.S. service personnel in Saudi Arabia. It is reported that the Saudi government insisted that Jewish religious services not be held on their soil but that Jewish soldiers be flown to nearby US warships.

== Rights of foreigners ==
=== Migrant workers' rights ===
Migrant workers in Saudi Arabia, who number more than 13 million, remain subject to the ''kafala'' (sponsorship) system, which restricts their ability to change employers or leave the country and leaves them vulnerable to exploitation. According to Amnesty International, labour abuses are widespread and include wage theft, unsafe working conditions, and substandard living conditions. In some cases, workers have gone unpaid for months and been left stranded without adequate support.

=== Stateless people ===
An estimated 70,000 people in Saudi Arabia are stateless (known as ''bedoon''). The group includes people of tribal origin who have lived in the country for generations, as well as some Yemenis who were previously naturalised but later stripped of citizenship. Similar populations of stateless people exist in other Gulf states, including the United Arab Emirates, Kuwait, Qatar, and Bahrain.

=== Laborers' rights ===
During the summer months, the Ministry of Human Resources and Social Development enforces a three-month ban on outdoor work during the hottest part of the day (typically 12:00–15:00) in order to protect workers from extreme heat. The ban applies to both Saudi and foreign workers in most private-sector outdoor jobs. Despite such measures, migrant workers continue to face heat-related health risks, including during Ramadan, when reduced working hours have in some cases also led to lower pay.

== Sectarianism and freedom of religion ==
Saudi Arabian law does not recognize religious freedom, and the public practice of non-Muslim religions is actively prohibited.

No law specifically requires citizens to be Muslims, but article 12.4 of the Naturalization Law requires that applicants attest to their religious affiliation, and article 14.1 requires that applicants get a certificate endorsed by their local cleric. The Government has declared the Quran and the Sunna (tradition) of the Islamic prophet Muhammad to be the country's constitution. Neither the Government nor society in general accepts the concepts of separation of religion and state, and such separation does not exist. The legal system is based on Shari'a (Islamic law), with Shari'a courts basing their judgments largely on a code derived from the Quran and the Sunna. According to Human Rights Watch, Saudi Arabia "systematically discriminates against its Muslim religious minorities, in particular Shia and Ismailis", but the Government permits Shi'a Muslims to use their own legal tradition to adjudicate noncriminal cases within their community.

Testifying before the US Congressional Human Rights Caucus, Ali al-Ahmed, Director of the Institute for Gulf Affairs, stated:

Saudi Arabia is a glaring example of religious apartheid. The religious institutions from government clerics to judges, to religious curriculums, and all religious instructions in media are restricted to the Wahhabi understanding of Islam, adhered to by less than 40% of the population. The Saudi government communized Islam, through its monopoly of both religious thoughts and practice. Wahhabi Islam is imposed and enforced on all Saudis regardless of their religious orientations. The Wahhabi sect does not tolerate other religious or ideological beliefs, Muslim or not. Religious symbols by Muslims, Christians, Jewish and other believers are all banned. The Saudi embassy in Washington is a living example of religious apartheid. In its 50 years, there has not been a single non-Sunni Muslim diplomat in the embassy. The branch of Imam Mohamed Bin Saud University in Fairfax, Virginia instructs its students that Shia Islam is a Jewish conspiracy.

As an Islamic state, Saudi Arabia gives preferential treatment for Muslims. During Ramadan, eating, drinking, or smoking in public during daylight hours is not allowed. Foreign schools are often required to teach a yearly introductory segment on Islam.

Saudi religious police have detained Shi'ite pilgrims participating in the Hajj, allegedly calling them "infidels in Mecca". The restrictions on the Shi'a branch of Islam in the Kingdom along with the banning of displaying Jewish, Hindu and Christian symbols have been referred to as apartheid.

In 2014, Saudi Arabia enacted new "anti-terrorism" legislation. Human Rights Watch criticized the broad language of the legislation and related government decrees, which have been used to prosecute and punish peaceful political activists and dissidents. HEW stated "these recent laws and regulations turn almost any critical expression or independent association into crimes of terrorism." A number of prominent human rights activists were detained under the new law, including Waleed Abulkhair and Mikhlif Alshammari. Interior Ministry regulations also defined "calling for atheist thought in any form, or calling into question the fundamentals of the Islamic religion on which this country is based" as terrorism.

=== International law ===
Saudi Arabia abstained from the United Nations vote adopting the Universal Declaration of Human Rights, saying it contradicted sharia. It is not a party to the International Covenant on Civil and Political Rights, which includes freedom of religion. The country holds a reservation to the Convention on the Rights of the Child against any provisions that are in conflict with sharia law; Article 14 gives freedom of "thought, conscience and religion" to children.

Saudi Arabia and some of the Gulf states have been carrying out airstrikes on Yemen, violating international laws and arresting anyone that criticizes them.

=== Jews ===
There has been virtually no Jewish activity in Saudi Arabia since the beginning of the 21st century. Census data does not identify any Jews as residing within Saudi Arabian territory.

=== Christians ===
The Saudi government has gone further than stopping Christians from worshipping in publicly designated buildings to even raid private prayer meetings among Christian believers in their own homes. On 15 December 2011, Saudi security forces arrested 35 Ethiopian Christians in Jeddah who were praying in a home, beating them and threatening them with death. When the Ethiopian workers' employers asked security forces for what reason they were arrested, they said "for practicing Christianity". Later, under mounting international pressure, this charge was changed to "mixing with the opposite sex".

In December 2012, Saudi religious police detained more than 41 individuals after storming a house in the Saudi Arabian province of al-Jouf. They were accused of "plotting to celebrate Christmas," according to a 26 December statement released by the police branch. Proselytizing by non-Muslims, including the distribution of non-Muslim religious materials such as Bibles, is illegal in Saudi Arabia.

=== Shia Muslims ===
Saudi Arabia's civil law gives shia the right to establish their mosques and personal courts in regions with significant Shia population. For example, the eastern region has “Ja'fari Court” for those who adhere the Jaafari Sect of Shia Islam. although there are no official statistics on how many shia mosques in Saudi Arabia, its presence in the eastern region is high.

Saudi Arabia has historically appointed Shias in high government positions notably the chairman of Aramco, Amin Nasser, who hails from the Predominant Shia city of Qatif. And the former Chairman of NEOM, Nadhmi Al-Nasr, who hails from the same city as well. Kawthar Al-Arbash, a prominent member of the Saudi Shura Council, is a Shiite woman from Qatif as well.

Jamil al-Jishi, an engineer who helped built Jubail Industrial City was a Shiite citizen who later served as Saudi Arabia's ambassador to Tehran.

Shiite citizens joined the third Saudi state in 1913, when Al-Ahsa and Qatif were annexed by Ibn Saud. There was no resistance or fighting involved. Ibn Saud guaranteed the Shiites of these regions the right to worship and to practice their religious rituals according to the rulings of the Shiite Jaafari sect.

The Saudi government had often been viewed as an active oppressor of Shia Muslims because of the funding of the Wahhabi ideology which denounces the Shia faith.

In 1988, fatwas passed by the country's leading cleric, Abdul-Aziz ibn Baz denounced the Shias as apostates. Another by Abdul-Rahman al-Jibrin, a member of the Higher Council of Ulama is on record as saying

Some people say that the rejectionists (Rafidha, i.e. Shia) are Muslims because they believe in God and Muhammad, pray and fast. But I say they are heretics. They are the most vicious enemy of Muslims, who should be wary of their plots. They should be boycotted and expelled so that Muslims be spared their evil.

According to a 2009 Human Rights Watch report, Shia citizens in Saudi Arabia "face systematic discrimination in religion, education, justice, and employment".

In November 2014 at al-Dalwah village in the eastern province of al-Ahsa, three unknown masked gunmen opened fire at a Husseiniya, or Shi'ite religious center, killing eight and injuring dozens.

While the government and the official media and religious establishment strongly condemned the attack, a handful of articles in the Saudi press argued that the attack "had not come out of nowhere", that there was anti-Shi'ite incitement in the kingdom on the part of "the religious establishment, preachers, and even university lecturers – and that it was on the rise".

In the Eastern city of Al-Khobar, whose population is predominately Shia, there are no Shia mosques. Saudi Arabia's religious police mandate prayers and all those in public buildings during prayer time are required to stop what they are doing to pray. Because there are minor differences between the way that Shiites and Sunnis pray and between prayer times, Shiites are forced to either pray the Sunni way or take a break from work.

In 2009, a group of Shiites on their way to perform hajj pilgrimage (one of the five pillars of Islam that all able-bodied Muslims are required to perform once in their lives) in Mecca were arrested by Saudi religious police. Between 20 and 24 February 2009, Shia pilgrims from the heavily Shia Eastern Province who had come to Medina for the anniversary of Muhammad's death clashed with Sunni religious police at the Baqi' cemetery over doctrinal differences concerning the rituals surrounding commemoration of the dead. Security forces shot a 15-year-old pilgrim in the chest, and an unknown civilian stabbed a Shia religious sheikh in the back with a knife, shouting "Kill the rejectionist [Shia]". The authorities denied that anyone had been wounded and played down the ensuing arrests of Shia pilgrims.

Religious police have arrested Shia women in the Eastern Province for matters as trivial as organizing classes for Quranic studies and selling clothing for religious ceremonies as if they were involved in political activities which are not allowed in KSA.

In the eastern city of Dammam where three quarters of the 400,000 residents are Shia, there are no Shia mosques or prayer halls, no Shia call to prayer broadcast on TV, and no cemeteries for Shia.

In late 2011, a Shiite pilgrim was charged for being "involved with blasphemy" and sentenced to 500 lashes and 2 years in jail. A prominent Shiite Canadian cleric, Usama al-Attar was also charged. He was released on the same day, declaring the arrest entirely unprovoked.

Much of education in Saudi Arabia is based on Sunni Wahhabi religious material. From a very young age, students are taught that Shiites are not Muslims and that Shiism is a conspiracy hatched by the Jews, and so Shiites are worthy of death. Government Wahhabi scholars, such as Abdulqader Shaibat al-Hamd, have proclaimed on state radio that Sunni Muslims must not "eat their [Shia] food, marry from them, or bury their dead in Muslims' graveyards".

The government has restricted the names that Shias can use for their children in an attempt to discourage them from showing their identity. Saudi textbooks are hostile to Shiism, often characterizing the faith as a form of heresy worse than Christianity and Judaism.

Because anti-Shia attitudes are engrained from an early age, they are passed down from generation to generation. This prejudice is found not only in textbooks, but also within the teachers in the classroom, and even in the university setting. (Wahhabi) teachers frequently tell classrooms full of young Shia schoolchildren that they are heretics. Teachers who proclaim that Shiites are atheists and deserve death have faced no repercussions for their actions, barely even receiving punishment. At a seminar about the internet, held in King Abdulaziz City of Science and Technology, professor Bader Hmood Albader explained that the internet was beneficial to society, but that there were many Shia websites claiming to be Muslim websites, which needed to be stopped.

Much discrimination occurs in the Saudi workforce as well. Shiites are prohibited from becoming teachers of religious subjects, which constitute about half of the courses in secondary education. Shiites cannot become principals of schools. Some Shiites have become university professors but often face harassment from students and faculty alike. Shiites are disqualified as witnesses in court, as Saudi Sunni sources cite the Shi'a practice of Taqiyya, wherein it is permissible to lie while they are in fear or at risk of significant persecution. Shia cannot serve as judges in ordinary court, and are banned from gaining admission to military academies, and from high-ranking government or security posts, including becoming pilots in Saudi Airlines.

The Saudi government has often been viewed as an active oppressor of Shias because of the funding of the Wahabbi ideology which denounces the Shia faith. In 1988, fatwas passed by the country's leading cleric, Abdul-Aziz ibn Baz denounced the Shias as apostates.

According to a 2009 Human Rights Watch report, Shia citizens in Saudi Arabia "face systematic discrimination in religion, education, justice, and employment".

In January 2016, Saudi Arabia executed the prominent Shiite cleric Sheikh Nimr, who had called for pro-democracy demonstrations, along with 47 other Saudi citizens sentenced by the Specialized Criminal Court on terrorism charges.

In May 2019, Human Rights Watch said that Saudi Arabia was seeking to extend the jail term for Sheikh Mohammad bin Hassan al-Habib, who the human rights group described as "a cleric known for supporting protests against the systematic discrimination of Saudi Arabia's Shia minority". At the time, Hassan al-Habib had been serving a seven-year prison sentence.

==== 2017 al-Awamiyah clashes ====
The Associated Press reports that, in 2017, the Saudi government "razed homes belonging to Shia residents" in a several-hundred years old area in al-Awamiyah. Saudi officials said that the area provided a haven for militant groups and stated that it would redevelop the area in which it razed homes. The Independent reports that a three-year-old and a two-year-old were killed by gunfire resulting from violence between government forces and armed anti-government protestors. The clashes began in May 2017, By August, locals had reported that between one- and two-dozen people had been killed in the shelling of the city and by sniper fire in what The Independent described as a "siege". According to an estimate provided by residents of the city, 20,000 residents fled the city in response to the violence.

=== Charges of magic, witchcraft, and sorcery ===
According to Sarah Leah Whitson, Middle East director at Human Rights Watch in 2009, "Saudi judges have harshly punished confessed 'witches' for what at worst appears to be fraud, but may well be harmless acts." In 2009, the Saudi "religious police" established a special "Anti-Witchcraft Unit" to educate the public, investigate and combat witchcraft.

Among the people executed in Saudi for magic and sorcery, and often other charges, are Egyptian pharmacist Mustafa Ibrahim (beheaded in 2007 in Riyadh), Muree bin Ali bin Issa al-Asiri (found in possession of talismans and executed in Najran province in June 2012), Amina bin Salem Nasser (executed in December 2011 in Jawf), and Abdul Hamid Bin Hussain Bin Moustafa al-Fakki (a Sudanese migrant worker executed in a car park in Medina on 20 September 2011). Ali Hussain Sibat, a Lebanese host of a popular fortune-telling TV program, was arrested while in Saudi in May 2008 on Umrah and sentenced to death but finally released sometime in 2011 or 2012.

Many convicted of magic receive lesser punishments of lashes and/or prison. In 2011, the "Anti-Witchcraft Unit" processed over 586 cases of magical crime. In 2012 there were 215 witchcraft arrests made. The majority of these offenders are foreign domestic workers from Africa and Indonesia. Foreign domestic workers who bring unfamiliar traditional religious or folk customs are a disproportionately affected by the anti-witchcraft campaign according to Human Rights Watch researchers Adam Coogle and Cristoph Wilcke. Saudis assume folk practices are "some kind of sorcery or witchcraft", and widespread belief in witchcraft means it can be invoked as a defense in Sharia courts against workers complaining of mistreatment by Saudi employers. Human Rights Watch believes that the conviction of a Syrian national, 'Abd al-Karim Mara'I al-Naqshabandi, who was executed in 1996 for undertaking "the practice of works of magic and spells and possession of a collection of polytheistic and superstitious books, was actually resulted from a dispute with his employer Prince Salman bin Sa'ud bin 'Abd al'Aziz, a nephew of King Fahd".

== Extraterritorial harassment, forced repatriation, and killing ==
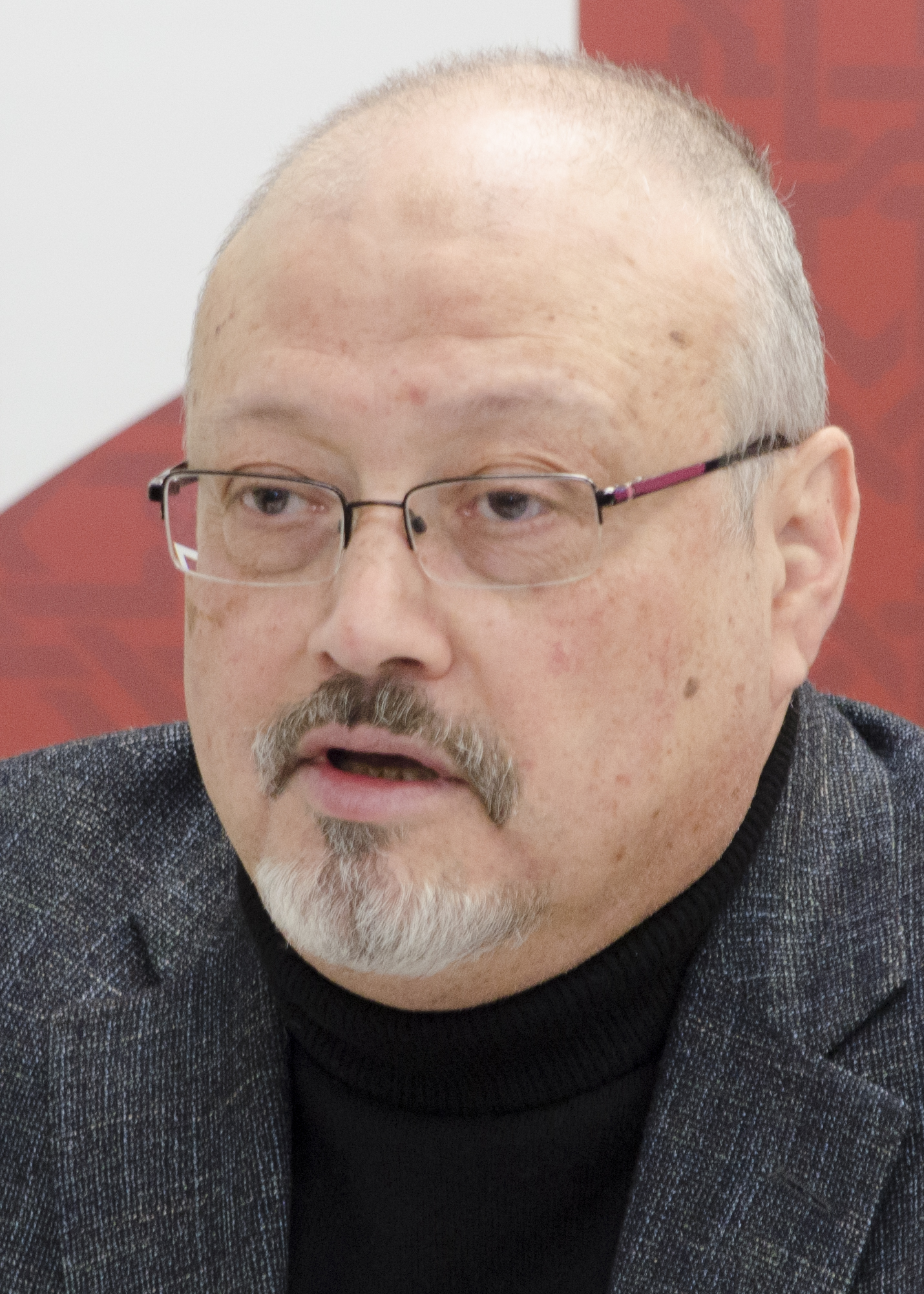
Jamal Khashoggi was murdered by Saudis in Turkey, because of his opposition to the government

About 1,200 people fled Saudi Arabia and sought asylum in other countries in 2017, including many women fleeing forced marriages or abusive male family members. The Saudi government has frozen bank accounts, arrested family members, and revoked official documents in an attempt to get fleeing citizens to return to the country or to a Saudi embassy. Students studying abroad have been threatened with termination of scholarships in response to criticism of the Saudi government on social media. In 2018, some studying in Canada were de-funded after the Canadian government criticized human rights in Saudi Arabia. Women who have successfully gained asylum in Western countries report fearing for their personal safety after being harassed by Saudi government agents on social media, and sometimes in person, warning them that they will be sorry for their actions or be punished. Occasionally they are asked to go to Saudi embassies for no stated reason. One woman, unlike most, reported going to the embassy to try to end harassment of a firm she had left to her business partners, but she said authorities attempted to get her to return, threatened her, and said the business would continue to have problems as long as she remained in Germany.

The Saudi government is suspected of being behind the disappearance of its critic Naser al-Sa'id from Lebanon in 1979. Human rights activist Loujain al-Hathloul was forcibly repatriated from the United Arab Emirates in 2017, jailed for a short time, banned from future international travel, and then disappeared after being arrested again in 2018. Her husband was forcibly repatriated from Jordan. In 2016, three women and seven children who fled to Lebanon were arrested by Lebanese police and returned to Saudi Arabia minutes after using a bank card.

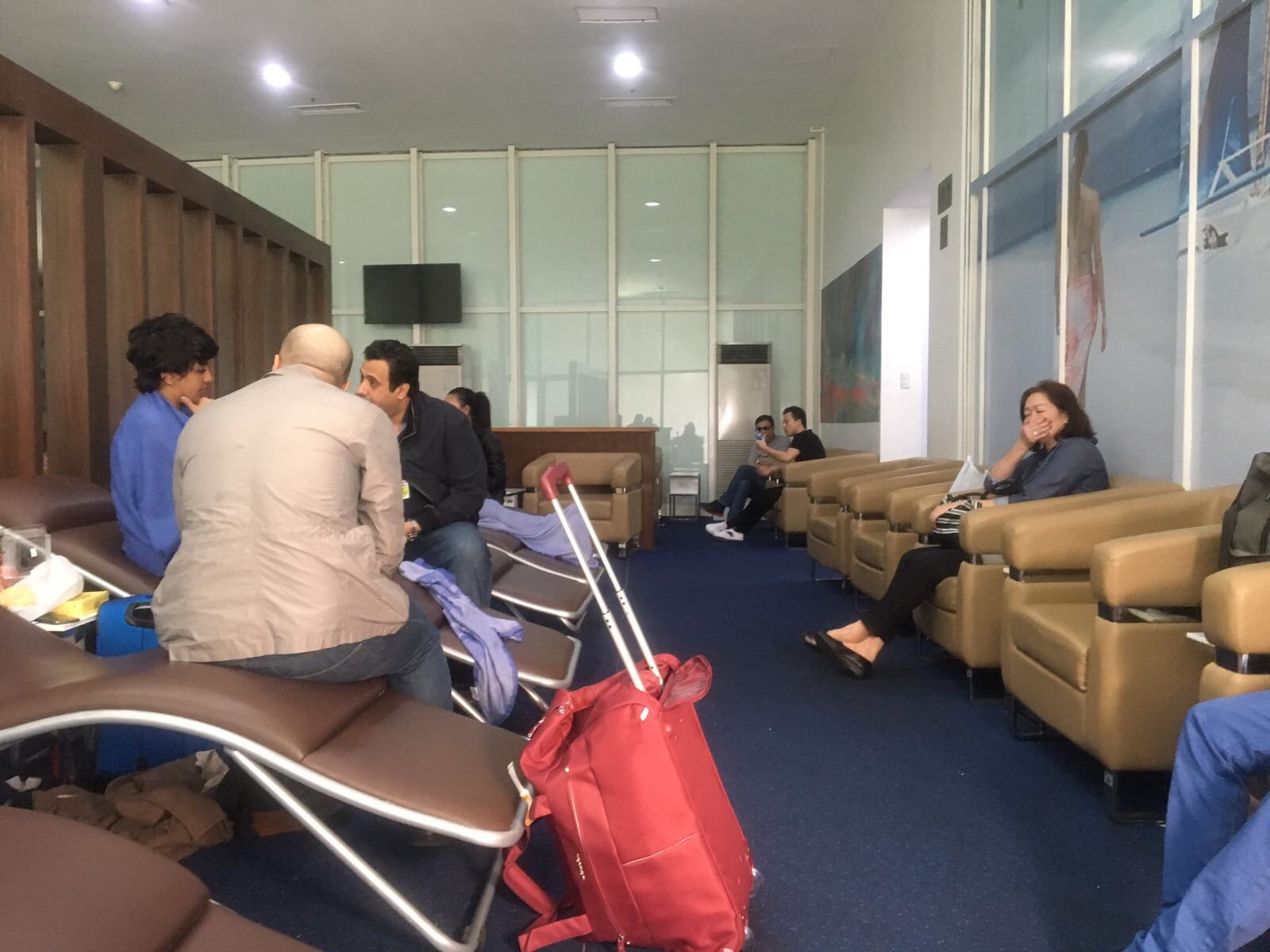
Last known photo of Dina Ali (left), on 10 April 2017

In April 2017, 24-year-old Dina Ali attempted to flee from Saudi Arabia to Australia via the Philippines to escape a forced marriage. Despite her pleas for international assistance over social media, airport personnel in the Philippines blocked her from boarding her flight to Sydney, and handed her over to Saudi authorities. She was duct taped and forcibly repatriated to Saudi Arabia, where she feared her family would kill her.

In January 2019, Rahaf Mohammed attempted a similar flight from a forced marriage, traveling to Australia via Kuwait and Thailand. She also said that her family threatened to kill her for leaving Islam (which is also a capital offense in Saudi Arabia). After her passport was taken and authorities in Thailand acted at the request of the Saudi government to stop her travel, she barricaded herself in her hotel room and pleaded on social media for international assistance. The UNHCR and the government of Canada intervened, and Rahaf traveled successfully to Canada via South Korea. Other Saudi women have done similar things.

On 2 October 2018, Jamal Khashoggi entered the Saudi consulate in Istanbul in order to deal with paperwork related to his marriage. A veteran Saudi journalist who had become a vocal critic of Saudi regime, upon arrival Khashoggi was assassinated and dismembered. In the previous September, Khashoggi had fled Saudi Arabia after the arrests of other Saudi intellectuals, clerics and activists, fearing that he too would be arrested or banned from travelling. On 3 October, a Saudi official claimed that Khashoggi had been neither detained nor killed, saying: "He is not in the consulate nor in Saudi custody." Ibrahim Kalin, Turkish presidential spokesman, said: "According to the information we have, this person who is a Saudi citizen is still at the Saudi consulate in Istanbul." Three weeks after Khashoggi went missing, Saudi authorities acknowledged that he had been killed at the consulate and that his body was removed from the consulate. The killing was described as "murder" and "a tremendous mistake" by Saudi Foreign Minister Adel al-Jubeir. On 25 October 2018, one of the Saudi public prosecutors told the media that Khashoggi's murder was "premeditated".

== Human rights organizations ==
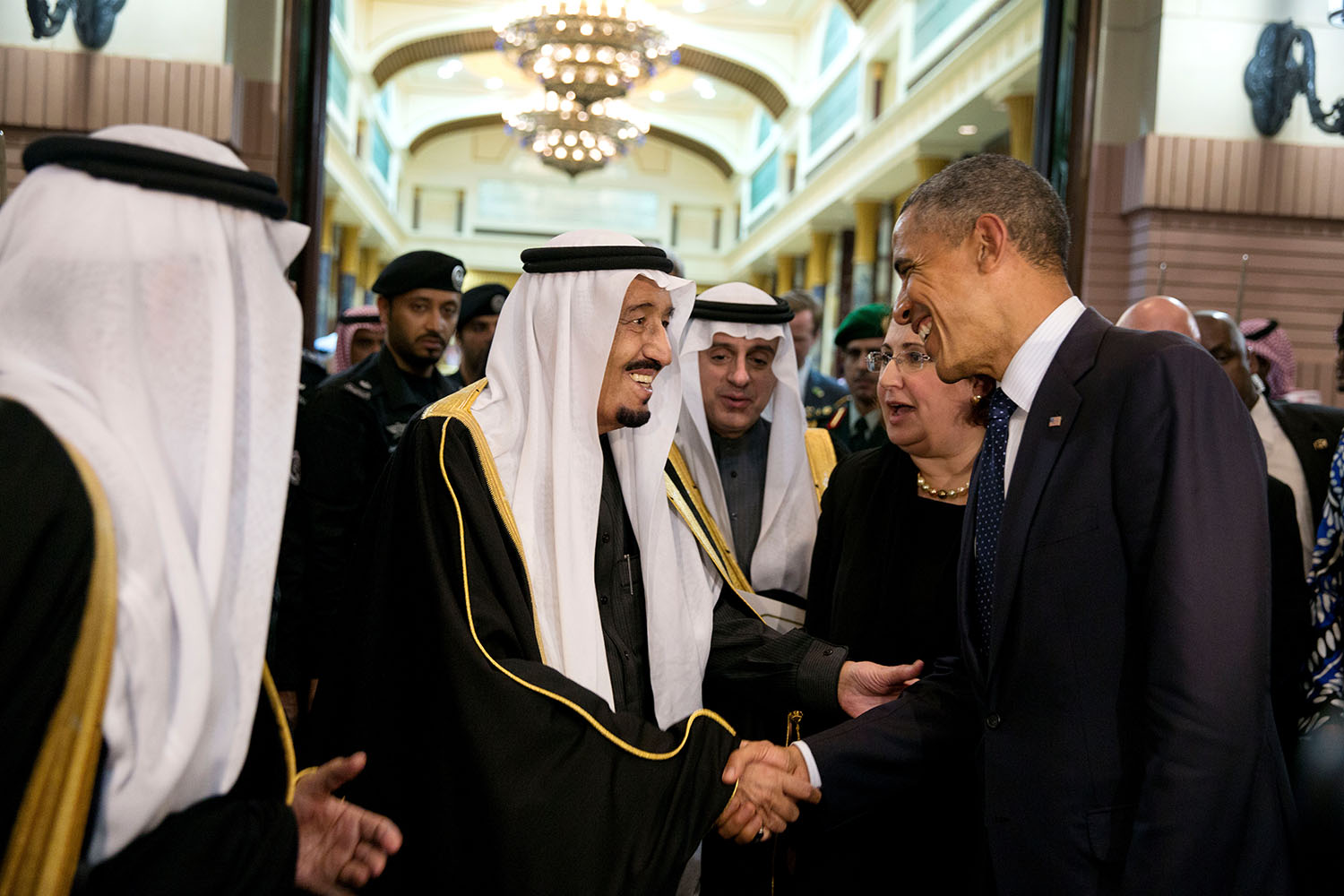
Human Rights Watch criticized U.S. President Barack Obama for not addressing human rights concerns in Saudi Arabia.

=== Independent ===
The Committee for the Defense of Human Rights in the Arabian Peninsula is a Saudi Arabian human rights organization based in Beirut since 1992.

The Human Rights First Society applied unsuccessfully for a governmental license in 2002, but was allowed to function informally. The Association for the Protection and Defense of Women's Rights in Saudi Arabia was created in 2007 and is also unlicensed.

The Saudi Civil and Political Rights Association (ACPRA) was created in 2009. One of its co-founders, Mohammed Saleh al-Bejadi, was arbitrarily arrested by Mabahith, the internal security agency, on 21 March 2011, during the 2011 Saudi Arabian protests. Al-Bejadi was charged in the Specialized Criminal Court in August 2011 for "insurrection against the ruler, instigating demonstrations, and speaking with foreign [media] channels". Another co-founder, Mohammad Fahad al-Qahtani, was charged for his human rights activities in June 2012.

Sixteen people who tried to create a human rights organization in 2007 were arrested in February 2007, charged in August 2010, and convicted on 22 November 2011 of "forming a secret [organization], attempting to seize power, incitement against the King, financing terrorism, and money laundering" and sentenced by the Specialized Criminal Court to 5–30 years' imprisonment, to be followed by travel bans. They appealed on 22 January 2012.

The Society for Development and Change was created to campaign for equal human rights for Shia Muslims in Eastern Province, Saudi Arabia. The organization calls for a constitution and elected legislature for Eastern Province. The European Saudi Organisation for Human Rights, which started operating around 2013, campaigns for Saudi human rights in general, including reports on what its leader Ali Adubisi describes as the Saudi government's "war" against the Eastern Province. ALQST is a Saudi human rights organization created in August 2014 by Yahya Assiri, with a Saudi-based team for collecting evidence and a London-based team for reports and human rights campaigning.

=== Government-associated ===
In 2004, the National Society for Human Rights, associated with the Saudi government, was created. Most of the commission's directors are members of the Saudi "religious and political establishment" according to John R. Bradley.

The Human Rights Commission is a government organization established in September 2005. It claims to be fully independent from the government in performing its responsibilities. In March 2019 it opposed international investigation of the 2 October 2018 assassination of Jamal Khashoggi.

== HIV/AIDS ==
By law, all Saudi citizens who are infected with HIV or AIDS are entitled to free medical care, protection of their privacy and employment opportunities. However, most hospitals will not treat patients who are infected, and many schools and hospitals are reluctant to distribute government information about the disease because of the strong taboos and stigma that are attached to how the virus can be spread.

Until the late 1990s, information on HIV/AIDS was not widely available to the public, but this has started to change. In the late 1990s, the government started to recognize World AIDS Day and allowed information about the disease to be published in newspapers. The number of people living in the kingdom who were infected was a closely guarded secret. However, in 2003 the government announced the number of known cases of HIV/AIDS in the country to be 6,700, and over 10,000 in June 2008.

== International conventions ==
The Kingdom of Saudi Arabia ratified the International Convention against Torture in October 1997 according to the Office of the UN High Commissioner for Human Rights. The Human rights of Saudi Arabia are specified in article 26 of the Basic Law of Saudi Arabia. Recently created human rights organizations include Human Rights First Society (2002), Association for the Protection and Defense of Women's Rights in Saudi Arabia (2007), Saudi Civil and Political Rights Association (2009) and the government-associated National Society for Human Rights (2004). In 2008, the Shura Council ratified the Arab Charter on Human Rights. In 2011, the Specialized Criminal Court was used to charge and sentence human rights activists.

== Responses and criticisms ==
The United Nations Special Rapporteur on Counter Terrorism, Ben Emmerson, criticized Saudi Arabia for violating human rights in the name of fighting terrorism during his visit to Saudi Arabia from 30 April to 4 May 2017. According to the report, Saudi Arabia uses its terrorism tribunal and counter-terrorism law to unjustly prosecute human rights defenders, writers, and peaceful critics.

At the U.N. Third Millennium Summit in New York City, King Abdullah bin Abdul Aziz defended Saudi Arabia's position on human rights, saying: "It is absurd to impose on an individual or a society rights that are alien to its beliefs or principles."

Canadian Minister of Foreign Affairs issued a statement via Twitter on 2 August 2018 expressing Canada's concern over the recent arrest of Samar Badawi, a human rights activist and sister of imprisoned Saudi blogger Raif Badawi, and called for the release of Saudi human rights activists. In response to Canada's criticism, Saudi Arabia expelled Canada's ambassador and froze all new trade with Canada.

A joint statement released by 36 countries at the United Nations Human Rights Council in Geneva in March 2019, condemned the murder of the Saudi journalist Jamal Khashoggi, called for the release of Saudi women's rights activists detained in May 2018, and urged the kingdom to stop using counter-terrorism regulations to target dissidents and human rights activists. The letter, which is the first collective rebuke of the kingdom, demanded the release of prominent women activists, including Loujain al-Hathloul, Hatoon al-Fassi and Samar Badawi.

In July 2019, following increased pressure from non-profit organization Human Rights Foundation, Nicki Minaj pulled out of the Jeddah World Fest, Saudi Arabia in support of the nation's suppressed women and LGBTQ community. Minaj said, "I could make one mistake & go to jail in a diff country where women have no rights," after learning about the constant abuse of human rights in the nation. The organization lauded Minaj's decision and urged other artists of the likes of Steve Aoki and Liam Payne from performing in the nation.

In November 2019, ahead of Saudi Spanish Super Cup due to be held in January 2020, Spanish broadcaster RTVE said that it will not bid for the hosting rights of the tournament because of human rights concern, especially women rights in the field of sports. "It's a country where until very recently women couldn't go to watch football," the broadcasting service said. RFEF President Luis Rubiales, defended the claims and said, he could assure women would be allowed to enter without any restrictions.

In January 2020, Human Rights Watch alongside 11 other international rights group organizations wrote a joint letter to the Amaury Sport Organization following its decision to move Dakar Rally to Saudi Arabia. The rights group in their letter accused Saudi Arabia of violating women's rights in the nation and asked the French organizer to denounce the persecution of women's rights, as well as adopt the human rights policy. "The Amaury Sport Organisation and race drivers at the Dakar Rally should speak out about the Saudi government's mistreatment of women's rights activists for advocating for the right to drive," the statement from the Human Rights Watch global initiatives director read.

In January 2020, Meghan MacLaren withdrew from Saudi leg of Ladies European Tour due to be held in March 2020. The golfer cited she cannot ignore what organizations like Amnesty International have highlighted. "I've decided not to play based on what I think sport is being used to do in Saudi Arabia", she said while emphasizing on the appalling human rights record of the nation. "We take for granted a lot of the choices and freedom we have available to us, but I try to make my decisions based on who I am as a person, not just a golfer," statement from her interview further read.

On 13 July 2020, Richard Masters, the CEO of Premier League was urged by the families of human rights campaigners, who are in Saudi prison, to stop the takeover of Newcastle United by Saudi Arabia, while their loved ones remain imprisoned.

On 15 January 2022, the three-time Grand Slam champion, Andy Murray, rejected seven-figure appearance fee to play in Saudi Arabia over human rights concerns. The event was also fiercely criticized by human rights organizations such as Amnesty International and Human Rights Watch, for attempting to cleanse the nation's reputation on the international stage.

== See also ==
- Capital punishment in Saudi Arabia
- Freedom of religion in Saudi Arabia
- Legal system of Saudi Arabia
- LGBT rights in Saudi Arabia
- Shi'a Islam in Saudi Arabia
- Human rights in Muslim-majority countries
- Human rights in the Middle East
- Timeline of first women's suffrage in majority-Muslim countries
- Hack of Jeff Bezos's phone
- Women's rights in Saudi Arabia
