= Samar Badawi =

Saudi Arabian human rights activist

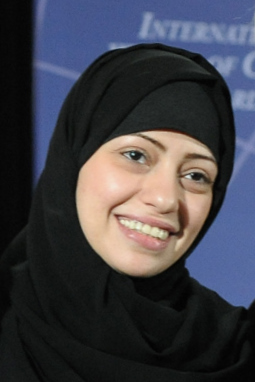
- Badawi at the 2012 International Women of Courage Awards
- Born: Samar bint Muhammad Badawi; 28 June 1981 (age 45)
- Known for: Legal conflict with father over male guardianship, women's suffrage lawsuit, women to drive movement
- Spouse: Waleed Abulkhair (m. 2010; div. 2015)
- Children: 1 son, 1 daughter
- Relatives: Raif Badawi (brother); Ensaf Haidar (sister-in-law)

Samar bint Muhammad Badawi (Arabic: سمر بدوي; born 28 June 1981) is a Saudi Arabian human rights activist. She and her father filed court cases against each other in Saudi Arabia. Badawi's father accused her of disobedience under the Saudi Arabian male guardianship system and she charged her father with adhl—"making it hard or impossible for a person, especially a woman, to have what she wants, or what's rightfully hers; e.g, her right to marry" according to Islamic jurisprudence—for refusing to allow her to marry. After Badawi missed several trial dates relating to the charge, an arrest warrant was issued for her, and Badawi was imprisoned on 4 April 2010. In July 2010, Jeddah General Court ruled in Samar Badawi's favor, and she was released on 25 October 2010, and her guardianship was transferred to an uncle. There had been a local and international support campaign for her release. The Saudi NGO Human Rights First Society described Badawi's imprisonment as "outrageous illegal detention".

Badawi filed a Grievances Board lawsuit against the Ministry of Municipal and Rural affairs for the rejection of her registration for the 2011 municipal elections. She participated in the 2011–2012 women driving campaign by driving regularly since June 2011 and helping women drivers with police and court procedures. In November 2011, she and Manal al-Sharif filed charges in the Grievances Board against the Saudi Arabian General Directorate of Traffic for rejecting their applications for drivers' licences. On 8 March 2012, Badawi was given an award by the United States Department of State for her contributions to women's rights.

In 2018, she was arrested by the Saudi authorities again. Canada's request for her immediate release sparked a major diplomatic dispute between Canada and Saudi Arabia.

== Early life ==
Samar was born on 28 June 1981 in Jeddah, Saudi Arabia to a Saudi father (Muhammad Badawi) and a Lebanese mother (Najwa). She is the sister of the Saudi Arabian writer and activist Raif Badawi.

== Disobedience and adhl court cases ==
Samar Badawi was allegedly physically abused by her father for 15 years. Her mother died prior to October 2010. In March 2008, she escaped to a women's shelter in Jeddah, the Protection Home. As her male guardian under the male guardianship system, Badawi's father filed a charge of disobedience against her. The Saudi Public Prosecutions and Investigation Bureau dropped the charge.

Badawi's father filed another disobedience charge against her in 2009. Badawi missed some court appearances. In June, Judge Abdullah al-'Uthaim issued a warrant for her arrest. In July, she moved from the women's shelter to her brother's home. A non-judicial investigation by the Protection Home stated that "Badawi's father had beaten and verbally abused her, used drugs, had 14 wives, had exhausted his financial resources, had repeatedly changed jobs, and became friendly with a 'bad group of people.'"

Badawi wished to marry. Her father refused permission. Badawi then filed an adhl charge against her father for the refusal to allow her marriage, requesting to remove her father as her guardian. According to Human Rights Watch, Badawi filed the adhl charge against her father after he had filed the disobedience charge against her. According to Arab News, Badawi's father filed the disobedience charge as a "counter-suit after" Badawi had filed the adhl charge.

When she went to court for the adhl case on 4 April 2010, she was arrested on the basis of the warrant that had been issued for the disobedience charge. Badawi was held in Briman Prison in Jeddah. On 18 July 2010, Khalid bin Faisal Al Saud, governor of Makkah Province, proposed creating a committee to "reconcile father and daughter by making him promise not to use violence against her, to allow her to marry, and not to file spurious lawsuits [that] he could not prove." Also in July 2010, Badawi's father was found guilty in the adhl case by the Jeddah General Court.

In mid-October 2010, the disobedience case against Badawi remained open, and Badawi's father filed an appeal against the result of the adhl case. On 18 October 2010, the Supreme Judicial Council of Saudi Arabia told Badawi's lawyer Abu al-Khair that it would investigate the legality of both cases. The Human Rights First Society, a Saudi Arabian human rights NGO, described Badawi's imprisonment as "outrageous illegal detention".

Saudi Arabian and international human rights activists campaigned for Badawi to be released. Badawi gave a petition to the National Society for Human Rights, a government-linked human rights NGO, asking not to be returned to her father and "easing her path to marriage".

On 25 October 2010, Badawi was released from prison on the orders of Governor Khalid bin Faisal. An uncle on her father's side became her new male guardian.

In September 2014, Badawi attended a discussion session of the United Nations Human Rights Council in Geneva, in which she talked about the situation of Human Rights advocates in Saudi Arabia.

== Women's suffrage ==
Badawi also took legal action in relation to women's suffrage. She filed a lawsuit in the Grievances Board, a non-Sharia court, against the Ministry of Municipal and Rural affairs, because of the refusal of voter registration centres to register her for the September 2011 Saudi Arabian municipal elections, claiming that there was no law banning women as voters or candidates and that the refusal was illegal. She cited Articles 3 and 24 of the Arab Charter on Human Rights, which refer to general and election-specific anti-discrimination, respectively. Badawi requested the Grievances Board to suspend the electoral procedures pending the Board's decision and to order the electoral authorities to register her as a voter and as eligible to be a candidate. On 27 April 2011, the Grievances Board accepted to hear her case at a later date. The Board's final decision was that Badawi's case was "premature". According to the United States Department of State, Badawi was the first person to file a lawsuit for women's suffrage in Saudi Arabia.

Badawi also applied to the Municipal Elections Appeal Committee to reverse the refusal of her registration. Her application was refused on the grounds that appeals against registration refusals must take place within three days of the refusal.

== 2011–2012 women driving campaign ==
In 2011 and 2012, Badawi participated in the 2011–2012 women driving campaign. Since the main campaign event in June 2011, Badawi drove in Jeddah "every two or three days". She helped other women drivers in their contacts with police and courts. Badawi stated that there is no legal basis for court trials of women on the charge of driving. She described the women's rights situation stating, "We are marginalized in very basic rights. They think that by giving us some political rights, we will be pleased and shut up."

On 4 February, following Manal al-Sharif's November 2011 filing of charges in the Eastern Province Grievances Board against the General Directorate of Traffic for the rejection of her application for a driver's licences, Badawi filed similar charges for the rejection of her own application for a driving licence. Badawi was asked by the Grievance Board of the Ministry of Interior to "follow-up in a week".

== International award ==
On 8 March 2012, Samar Badawi was awarded the 2012 International Women of Courage Award by the United States Department of State for her filing of the adhl and voting rights lawsuits, which were seen by the Department of State as pioneering, and for her encouragement of and inspiration to other women.

== 2014 travel ban ==
On 16 September 2014, Badawi attended a discussion session of the United Nations Human Rights Council in Geneva, on behalf of the organization Americans for Democracy and human rights in Bahrain (ADHRB) and the Bahrain Institute of Rights and Democracy (BIRD) and Human Rights Watch in Saudi Arabia. Her presentation centered on the situation of human rights advocates in Saudi Arabia, and the detention of her husband activist Waleed Abulkhair.

On 18 September 2014, while at the Human Rights Council in Geneva, Badawi met with the High Commissioner of Human Rights, Prince Zeid bin Ra'ad. On 20 September 2014, Badawi flew to the US, where she met US Senators and secretaries of several human rights organizations to discuss the issue of her husband Waleed Abulkhair and other detainees. At that time, Badawi said she received a direct threat from the secretary of the Foreign Minister of Saudi Arabia that she must stop her human rights activities otherwise action would be taken against her. She subsequently returned to Saudi Arabia without incident, other than local authorities taking her passport.

On 2 December 2014, Badawi went to King Abdulaziz International Airport, to leave Saudi Arabia for a flight to Brussels, Belgium, to participate in the 16th European Union (EU) NGOs Forum on Human Rights. Passport Office staff said the Ministry of Interior issued a travel ban and would not allow her to travel abroad. The EU contacted the Saudi authorities to seek clarification of the reasons for this ban.

== January 2016 arrest ==
In a press release 12 January 2016, Amnesty International announced that Samar Badawi had been arrested and taken with her 2-year-old daughter Joud to a police station in Jeddah where she was interrogated. Four hours later, Badawi was transferred to Dhahban Central Prison, the same prison where her brother, Saudi dissident Raif Badawi is held. On 13 January, The Guardian quoted "activists" as saying Samar Badawi had been "freed on bail after being arrested and held briefly" at the Dhahban prison. She was said to be home with her daughter, but had been ordered to report to the police in Jeddah early 14 January for further interrogation.

Philip Luther, Director of Amnesty International's Middle East and North Africa Program called Badawi's arrest, "...yet another alarming setback to human rights in Saudi Arabia [demonstrating] the extreme lengths to which the authorities are prepared to go in their relentless campaign to harass and intimidate human rights defenders into silent submission." Ensaf Haidar, wife of Samar's brother and President of the Raif Badawi Foundation, confirmed reports of Samar Badawi's arrest via Twitter. Center for Inquiry, an American nonprofit educational organization, called for her immediate release, and asked the US State Department to "bring to bear what diplomatic power they have to press Saudi Arabia to release Samar." A spokesperson for the Saudi Interior Ministry, Maj. Gen. Mansour Turki, denied claims that Badawi had been arrested.

== July 2018 arrest ==
According to Human Rights Watch (HRW), Samar Badawi, along with Nassima al-Sadah, were arrested by Saudi authorities on 30 July. She was held in the Dhahban Central Prison.

Following criticism and calls for Badawi's release on the part of Canadian Minister of Foreign Affairs Chrystia Freeland, Saudi Arabia expelled Canada's ambassador, and froze trade with Canada.

=== 2021 release ===
On 27 June 2021, Badawi was released from prison after serving her sentence.

== See also ==
- Women's rights in Saudi Arabia
- Saudi Americans
- 2011 Saudi Arabian protests
- Dina Ali
- Islamic Feminism
- Sara bint Talal bin Abdulaziz Al Saud
- Hamza Kashgari
- Mishaal bint Fahd bin Mohammed Al Saud
- Nassima al-Sadah
- Walid Fitaihi
