= Alshamary =

Alshamary or Alshammari or Al-Shammari (in Arabic الشمري) is an Arabic surname. Notable people with the surname include:

== Persons ==
- Nohair Al-Shammari
- Mikhlif Alshammari
- Saad Al-Shammari
- Suad Al-Shammari
- Mohanad Ali Kadhim Al-Shammari
- Ismael Alshameary Puente
- sara alshammarir

== Tribe ==
Shammar

Shammar is a prominent and influential Arab tribe, predominantly located in Saudi Arabia, Iraq, and Syria.

== Variant Spellings ==
Although only one form of spelling in the Arabic language (الشمري), the spelling of this surname tends to differ upon romanisation, this is just how the English language works and there is no standard spelling for most surnames, if not all. English professors, teachers, authors, writers and any figure specialising in the English language are all trying their best to standardise English and keep it following one rule and one form.

Frequent methods of spelling (الشمري) includes:

Alshamary, Alshammary, Alshammari, Alshamery, Alshamari, Al-Shammari and many other variants. Names can be romanised and spelled however liked. A small percentage also spells this surname as Shamary/Shamari or Shammary/Shammari.

== Sweden ==
The family name of Swedish swimmer Therese Alshammar has a different origin than Al(-)shamary (or any other variant spellings) because it is derived from "Hammar", which is a common Swedish name for people as well as for places. However her name seemed to have been mistaken for having a connection to the Middle East.
