= Suliman al-Reshoudi =

Saudi Arabian activist

Suliman Ibrahim al-Reshoudi سليمان الرشودي
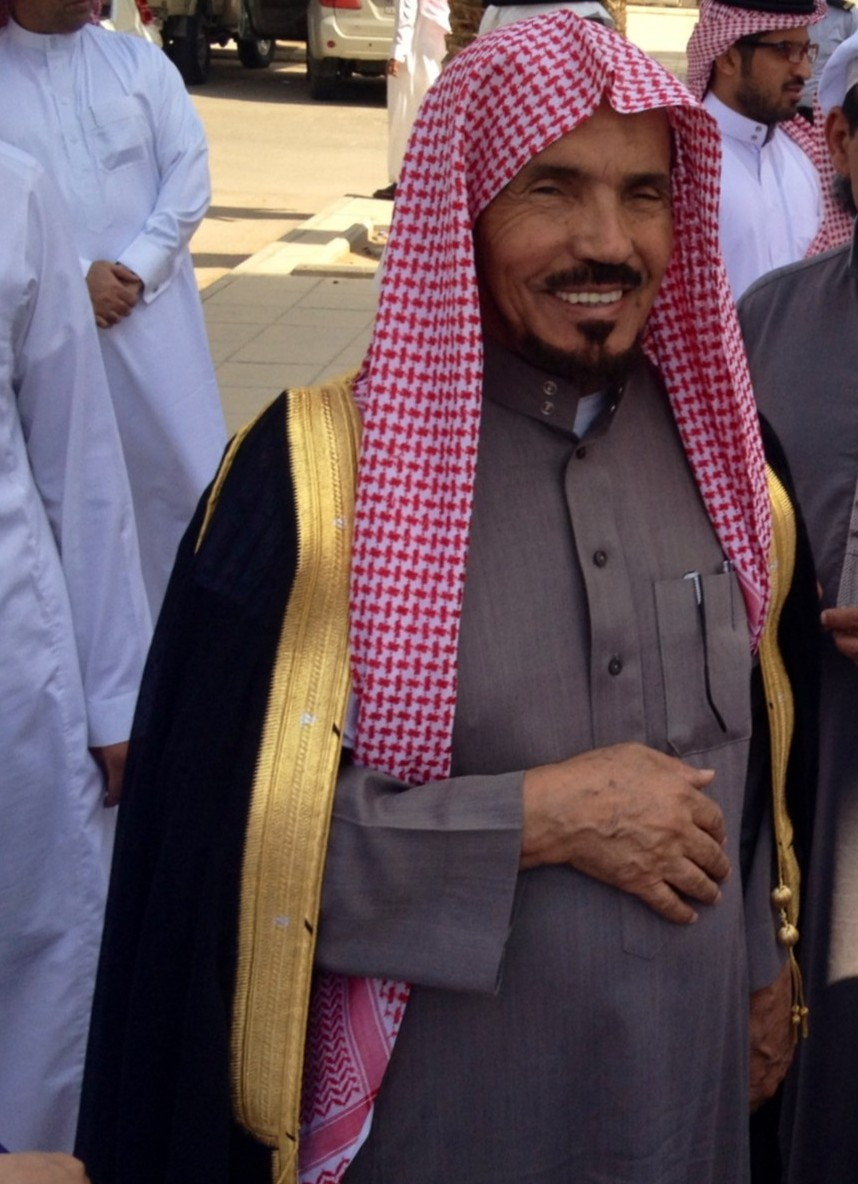
- al-Reshoudi in 2012
- Born: 1936 or 1937 (age 88–89)
- Occupations: lawyer, former judge, human rights defender
- Known for: calling for democracy and non-violent protest and change in Saudi Arabia

Judge Suliman Ibrahim al-Reshoudi (Arabic: سليمان الرشودي; also spelled Suleiman al-Rushoodi, Suliaman al-Rashudi, born 1936 or 1937) is a Saudi Arabian human rights lawyer and pro-democracy activist. He was imprisoned in the 1990s, and again from 2007 until his release on humanitarian grounds on 23 June 2011 at the age of 74–75. In November 2011, he was convicted of "breaking allegiance with the King" and possessing literature by Madawi al-Rasheed and sentenced to 15 years' imprisonment followed by a 15-year travel ban. As of January 2012, his conviction was pending appeal at the Specialized Criminal Court.

== Legal and human rights career ==
Al-Reshoudi is a lawyer who had the status of judge for two decades. He was one of the founding members of the Committee for the Defense of Legitimate Rights (CDLR), created in 1993 during calls by Saudi Arabian intellectuals for reform. He was arrested along with other calling for reform.

He has represented many prisoners held without charge or trial. In 2006 and 2007, prior to his own arrest during the 2 February 2007 mass arrest, al-Reshoudi helped detainees to try to sue Mabahith over their arbitrary detention by filing cases with the Grievances Board. Al-Reshoudi has sent reports about "countless" political prisoners to United Nations Special Rapporteurs.

== Arrests ==
=== 1990s ===
Al-Reshoudi was detained in the 1990s during an arrest campaign against reformists, including CDLR members. He remained in prison for five years.

=== 2007–2011 ===
Al-Reshoudi was arrested again on 2 February 2007. On 28 November 2007, the United Nations Working Group on Arbitrary Detention stated that al-Reshoudi and the other 2 February 2007 detainees were held illegally. In 2009, the Saudi Civil and Political Rights Association (ACPRA) stated that al-Reshoudi had been severely tortured.

Al-Reshoudi's legal defence team filed a court case with the Grievances Board against the Ministry of Interior/Mabahith on 16 August 2009 on the grounds that the detentions were arbitrary. Eight court sessions were held. Mabahith representatives were officially absent from four of the sessions, including the final session on 28 August 2010.

The eighth (final) session was attended by representatives of ACPRA, the Human Rights First Society, the National Society for Human Rights, and international journalists. Mabahith plainclothes agents were present in the corridors near the courtroom and in the courtroom itself and tried to prevent human rights organisations' representatives and journalists from entering the courtroom. ACPRA described the official absence as "contempt of the judiciary". The presiding judge stated that the Ministry of Interior had informed the Grievances Board the previous night, 27 August 2010, that al-Reshoudi and the other detainees had been tried in court in Jeddah. Al-Reshoudi's defence team stated that the Jeddah trial consisted of the detainees appearing with their hands and legs chained before an unidentified "judge-like individual" from an unidentified institution, and did not constitute an appearance before a competent court. The judge dismissed the case against Mabahith "for lack of jurisdiction".

In January 2011, ACPRA and the Human Rights First Society complained to King Abdullah about the torture of the septuagenarian judge, whose feet were reportedly chained to his bed each night and who was forced to sit up during the day. As of March 2011, he was held in al-Ha'ir Prison. On 20 March 2011, during the 2011–2012 Saudi Arabian protests, al-Reshoudi's daughter Dana al-Reshoudi visited the Ministry of Interior in Riyadh along with 30 other women and 200 men to ask for their "husbands, fathers, brothers, and sons" to be released. Dana al-Reshoudi and other women were detained and interrogated in al-Ha'ir Prison for the night and released when their male guardians arrived at the prison and signed to release them. Suliman al-Reshoudi was released on 23 June 2011 for health reasons but the charges against him remained.

On 22 November 2011, al-Reshoudi was sentenced to 15 years' imprisonment, to be followed by 15 years' travel ban. Two of the charges he was convicted of were "breaking allegiance with the King" and "possessing banned articles by Professor Madawi al-Rasheed". Along with other reformists sentenced on the same day, al-Reshoudi filed an appeal against his conviction in the Specialized Criminal Court on 23 January 2012. Amnesty International representative Philip Luther criticised the convictions of al-Reshoudi and the other reformists, stating, "Some of these charges appear to be criminalizing the peaceful exercise of the right to freedom of expression, including advocacy of political change. In these cases, the convictions should be quashed. Even the seemingly more serious charges on which some of the 16 men were convicted, such as money laundering, need to be re-examined carefully, as the convictions followed a grossly unfair trial." Amnesty International called for the appeals to follow the international standards for fair trials.
