= Mishaal bint Fahd Al Saud =

Saudi royal

- Born: 1958
- Died: 15 July 1977 (aged 18–19); Jeddah, Saudi Arabia
Names
- Mishaal bint Fahd bin Muhammad bin Abdulaziz Al Saud
- House: House of Saud
- Father: Fahd bin Muhammad bin Abdulaziz Al Saud

Princess Mishaal bint Fahd Al Saud (1958 – 15 July 1977; Arabic: الأميرة مشاعل بنت فهد بن محمد بن عبدالعزيز آل سعود) was a member of the House of Saud who was executed by shooting allegedly for committing adultery in 1977, at the age of 19. The affair and execution was fictionalized and dramatized in 1980 British docudrama Death of a Princess, which caused an uproar in the Muslim world and resulted in disruptions to international diplomacy and trade.

== Background ==
Mishaal was a daughter of Prince Fahd bin Muhammad and a granddaughter of Prince Muhammad bin Abdulaziz, a son of King Abdulaziz of Saudi Arabia and the older and only full brother of King Khalid.

Mishaal's family sent her, at her own request, to Beirut, Lebanon, to attend school. While there, she fell in love with a man, Khaled al Sha'er Muhalhal, the nephew of Ali Hassan al Shaer, the Saudi ambassador in Lebanon, and they began an affair. Upon their return to Saudi Arabia, it emerged that they had conspired to meet alone on several occasions and a charge of adultery was brought against them. She attempted to fake her own drowning and was caught trying to escape from Saudi Arabia with Khaled. Although the Princess was disguised as a man, she was recognized by a passport examiner at Jeddah International Airport. She was subsequently returned to her family. Under the Sharia law current in Saudi Arabia, a person can be convicted of adultery only by the testimony of four adult male witnesses to the act of sexual penetration, or by their own admission of guilt, stating four times in court "I have committed adultery." Her family urged her not to confess but instead merely to promise never to see her lover again. On her return to the courtroom, she repeated her confession: "I have committed adultery. I have committed adultery. I have committed adultery. I have committed adultery."

== Execution ==
On 15 July 1977, both Mishaal and Khaled were publicly executed in Jeddah by the side of the Queen's Building in the park. She was blindfolded, made to kneel, and executed on the explicit instructions of her grandfather, a senior member of the royal family, for the dishonor that she had brought on her clan. Khaled, after being forced to watch her execution, was beheaded with a sword by, it is believed, one of the princess's male relatives rather than by a professional executioner. Severing his head took five blows. Both executions were conducted near the palace in Jeddah, not in Deera Square, the historic site where those sentenced to death in Saudi Arabia are publicly executed.

== Death of a Princess documentary ==
Independent film producer Antony Thomas came to Saudi Arabia and interviewed numerous people about the princess' story. He was met by conflicting stories, which later became the subject of a British documentary, Death of a Princess. The film was scheduled to show on 9 April 1980 on the ITV television network and then a month later on the public television network PBS in the United States. Both broadcasts were met with livid protests followed by strong diplomatic, economic and political pressure from the Saudis to cancel these broadcasts. After having failed to get the British broadcast cancelled, King Khalid expelled the British ambassador from Saudi Arabia.

In May 1980, attention then shifted to PBS where their officials endured a month of mounting pressure from corporations and politicians. A major PBS sponsor, the Mobil Oil Corporation, took out a full-page ad in The New York Times op-ed page opposing the film and declaring it jeopardized U.S.-Saudi relations. After some stalling, it was eventually broadcast by the PBS program World in most of the US on 12 May 1980, although some PBS stations did not do so. For example, in South Carolina, the PBS affiliate South Carolina Educational Television canceled the broadcast of the film, a decision influenced by the fact that the then US Ambassador to Saudi Arabia, John C. West, had formerly been the state's governor. In 2005, PBS aired Death of a Princess on Frontline, the successor to World, to commemorate the 25th anniversary of the original broadcast.

King Khalid was said to have offered $11 million to the network to suppress the film.

According to director Antony Thomas, there was no trial or official execution:

It wasn't a trial. She wasn't even executed in the Square of Justice. She was just executed in a car park. I've witnessed executions in Saudi Arabia, I'm afraid. They're always done in a special square. This wasn't even done there. It wasn't done with an official executioner, not that that would make it any worse or any better. But this was not following the process of any law.

David Fanning, co-writer and executive producer of Death of a Princess, added:

The difference between the official version, which was the girl was killed because she was found guilty of adultery, and the truth of it, which turns out that she was, in fact, executed by the king's elder brother in an act of tribal vengeance in a parking lot in Jeddah, was, in fact, the heart of the controversy because that was the part that, of course, the royal family could not countenance. And that was the great outrage.

Thomas stated that the killing was "about honor" instead of being based in Islamic law. Raza Ali Sayeed of Dawn wrote that "it’s probable" that her death occurred "for simply bringing dishonor to the family". Lora Wildenthal, author of The Language of Human Rights in West Germany, described the event as an honor killing.

== See also ==
- Executions in Saudi Arabia
- 2011 Saudi Arabian protests
- Dina Ali Lasloom
- Sara bint Talal Al Saud
- Samar Badawi
- Hamza Kashgari
- Manal al-Sharif
