= Fouad al-Farhan =

Saudi Arabian blogger

Fouad al-Farhan Alghamdi فؤاد الفرحان الغامدي
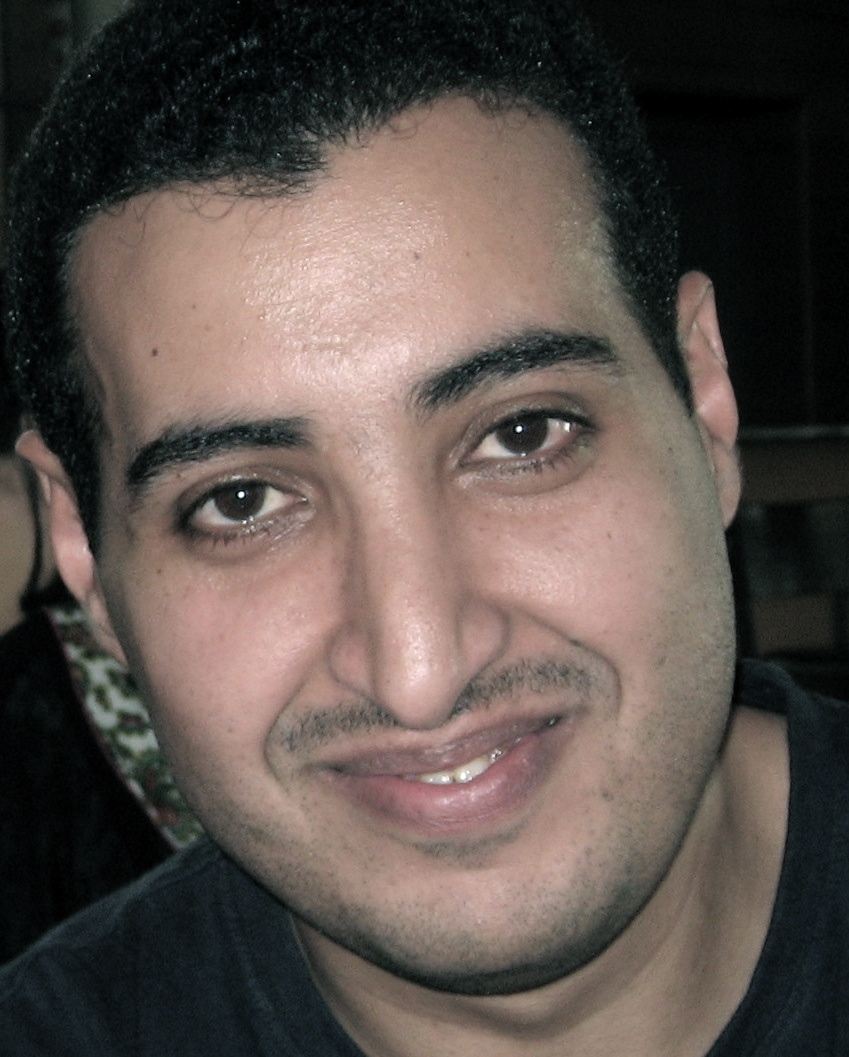
- Born: 1975 (age 50–51); Taif, Saudi Arabia
- Children: 2

Fouad Ahmad Alfarhan is a popular Saudi Arabian blogger and political commentator noted for his advocacy of political reforms on his blog. Farhan is unusual among Saudi Arabian bloggers because he uses his real name rather than blogging under a pseudonym. Farhan had stopped blogging for a period after being told by government officials to "tone down" his commentary. He resumed posting in July 2007. On Tuesday, December 10, 2007 Farhan was arrested in Jeddah. The arrest was reported by other Arab bloggers, and Saudi authorities confirmed he was being held for "interrogation." No official charges were relayed. He was held in solitary confinement without charges. He was released from prison on April 26, 2008.

Reacting to his arrest, friends created the website Free Fouad calling for his release. Gamal Eid, the executive director of the Arabic Network for Human Rights Information, commented "When the Saudi authorities arrest a young man writing maturely and is against terrorism and calls for reformation, it is a serious indicator for how far are the fanatic and those opposing freedom of expression and reformation are taking over in Saudi Arabia."

Prior to his arrest Farhan worked as a manager at Smart Info Co. in Jeddah. He is married and has two children, Raghad and Khetab. Fouad Al-Farhan is optimistic about the potential for blogging in Saudi Arabia, having said that "If we worked hard to spread blogging in Saudi Arabia, and convinced some influential people to adopt it, then we will gain the benefits of blogging in the same way Western societies did" he says, "we have to move on."

== See also ==
- Political freedoms in Saudi Arabia
