= National Society for Human Rights =

National Society for Human Rights الجمعية الوطنية لحقوق الانسان
- Abbreviation: NSHR
- Formation: 2004
- Purpose: Human Rights
- Headquarters: Riyadh
- Location: Saudi Arabia
- Region served: Saudi Arabia
- President: Abdullah bin Ojaym al-Qahtani
- Affiliations: Saudi government
- Website: nshr.org.sa

The National Society for Human Rights (NSHR) is a Saudi Arabian human rights organisation closely associated with and funded by the Saudi government. It was established on 10 March 2004; two years after the Human Rights First Society applied unsuccessfully for a licence. As of August 2018, the President of the NSHR was Mufleh bin Rabayan al-Qahtani.

== History ==
In March 2004, several citizens of the Kingdom of Saudi Arabia established the National Society for Human Rights. The Embassy of Saudi Arabia in Washington, D.C. described the NSHR as the "first independent human rights organization in Saudi Arabia". Human Rights First Society was created two years earlier, in 2002, and denied a licence to exist formally.

== Work ==
The National Society for Human Rights (NSHR) implements the international human rights charters signed by Saudi Arabia, and also includes a special panel to monitor violations of women's rights. According to its resolution, the Society seeks to protect human rights and preserve human dignity as ordered by Allah, Most Powerful, in the Qur’an: "And indeed We have honoured the Children of Adam". It seeks to support the rights of citizens, to monitor and pursue their rights as established and recognized by Islamic Sharia law and applicable regulations, and seeks to protect citizens from possible violations, abuses, and breaches of those rights. It also seeks to contribute to international efforts and worldwide cooperation aimed at preserving human rights. The main office is in Riyadh, but it also has four other branches in Saudi Arabia, located in Jeddah, Makkah, Jizan, and East Province, and it is working to open a fifth branch in Aljouf. The Society initially consisted of 41 founding members, six of whom are women. NHSR issues periodic reports on the progress of human rights in Saudi Arabia, including a monthly bulletin called Hogog ("Rights").

The Society's income is generated from publications, bulletins, and revenue generated from symposia and fairs. Moreover, revenues are generated from property investments. In addition, the Society accepts gifts, testaments, Awqaf (endowments), grants, and other resources that do not contradict with the objectives of the Society.

== Support for Saudi government ==
The August 2018 diplomatic dispute with Canada started when Canadian Minister of Foreign Affairs Chrystia Freeland's called on 2 August 2018 in a tweet for Saudi human rights activists Samar Badawi and Raif Badawi to be released from prison. The Saudi government responded with punitive actions against Canada. NSHR stated its support for the Saudi governmental response. The head of the NHSR, Mufleh bin Rabayan al-Qahtani, stated to the Saudi Press Agency that the tweet transgressed international norms and Saudi sovereignty.

== See also ==
- Human rights in Saudi Arabia#Human rights organizations
- LGBT rights in Saudi Arabia
