= Walid Fitaihi =

Saudi Arabian physician (b. 1964)

Walid Ahmad Hasan Fitaihi
- Born: 24 September 1964 (age 61); Jeddah, Saudi Arabia
- Education: George Washington University; Harvard University
- Occupations: Physician, tv presenter, ceo of the international medical center
- Website: Walid Fitahi Twitter account

Walid Fitaihi (Arabic: وليد فتيحي) (born 24 September 1964) is a Saudi-American physician and a motivational speaker on Saudi television. In November 2017, a decade after returning from study and work in the United States, Fitaihi was arrested by Saudi authorities and taken to the Ritz Carlton hotel as part of the 2017–19 Saudi Arabian purge, together with many prominent prisoners. He was later moved to al-Hair prison, south of the capital, and released only in August 2019.

== Early life and career ==
Walid Fitaihi was born on 24 September 1964 in Jeddah, Saudi Arabia. He also holds United States citizenship. Massachusetts state records shows he had registered to vote when he was living in Cambridge. He took his undergraduate and medical degrees from George Washington University and a master's in public health from Harvard University. His family decided to build a private hospital in Jeddah in 2006. He returned to Saudi Arabia that same year to help his family set up the hospital, named International Medical Center, of which he later became CEO.

Fitaihi was a popular Saudi reformist and TV presenter, best known for the television show Mahyay, which was about conversations around keeping the mind, body and soul healthy. He became a motivational speaker on Saudi television. He attracted nearly two million followers on his social media.

== Arrest and release ==
Fataihi was initially arrested in September 2017 but was released under a travel ban pledge. He was arrested again in November 2017. He was taken from his home in Jeddah in the middle of the night and moved to the Ritz-Carlton hotel in Riyadh where the crown prince Mohammad bin Salman was keeping at least 200 wealthy Saudis in detention as an alleged crackdown on corruption, during the 2017–19 Saudi Arabian purge.

The New York Times reported that Saudi Arabia had been abusing its prisoners in detention and, as a result, at least 17 people were hospitalized during their arrest and at least one of them died, according to a doctor at the hospital and an American official monitoring the crackdown. Most detainees had been released after signing off agreements and pledging large payments in exchange for their freedom.

Qatari news broadcaster Al Jazeera reported Fitaihi had told a friend that he was "blindfolded, stripped of his underwear and bound to a chair". Also, the daily report said, the Saudi government had tortured him with electrical shocking for a 1-hour session. Moreover, reports said, he was harshly whipped and could not sleep on his back for days.

Howard M. Cooper, Fitaihi's lawyer, said to the United States Department of State that he had told Fitaihi's wife and family that Fataihi "is in fear for his life; he won't take his situation any longer; he desires all possible help."

As of March 2019, Fitaihi had not been officially charged with any crimes. He was transferred to the al-Hair prison for longer-term incarceration. His family tried to use public pressure on the Saudi government and US President Trump to secure his release from prison.

Fitaihi was later released on 1 August 2019.

== Reactions ==
Saudi journalist Jamal Khashoggi tweeted about Fitaihi before his assassination: "What has happened to us? How can someone like Dr. Walid [Fitaihi] be arrested and what are the justifications for it? Of course, everyone is in a state of confusion and helplessness, there is no one you can go to, no public prosecutor has questioned. God help us."

US National Security Advisor John Bolton, when asked about Fitaihi's case during an interview on CNN's "State of the Union", said that "he knew only that American diplomats had recently met with him in prison. Beyond that, we don't really have any additional information at this point." In response to an Associated Press query, the State Department released a statement confirmed that U.S. diplomatic representatives had met with Fitaihi and had "raised his case" with the Saudi government.

Andrew Miller, deputy director for policy at the Project on Middle East Democracy, said in regards to Fitaihi's imprisonment: "Trump is willing to sell or forsake any person, regardless of whether they are an American resident or an American citizen, in the furtherance of narrow economic interests."

== See also ==
- 2017–19 Saudi Arabian purge
- Assassination of Jamal Khashoggi
- Human rights in Saudi Arabia
