= Blogging in Arab countries =

Blogging is increasingly used in many countries around the globe, including those with oppressive and authoritarian regimes. In many Arab countries with oppressive and authoritarian regimes, where the government conventionally has controlled print and broadcast media, blogs and other forms of new media provide a new public sphere where citizens can obtain information they are interested in and exchange their personal opinions concerning several topics, including politics, economics, culture, love, life and religion.

== Theoretical impacts of blogging ==
The impacts of blogging and social media in general are widely debated. From an optimistic point of view they are often acclaimed as having democratising potential and described as important instruments to replace authoritarian regimes and to support democracy and freedom. The active use of the Internet can provide a more intense democratic participation and will support a direct form of democracy. The Israeli-American scholar Yochai Benkler, whose notion is typically discussed in this context, sees the Internet as an important benefit for individual independence and freedom. He describes the networked public sphere as an online space where citizens can cooperate, exchange their opinions and collaborate as guardians over the society. In countries where political themes in public are still not welcome, blogging became an important instrument for citizen to express their opinion relating to political developments. Blogging provides a platform for the exchange of information and for political mobilisation that is difficult to control by governments. In countries where media are centrally controlled the Internet breaks the monopoly of communication that was confined to the government and enables each citizen to become a political broadcaster.

The American legal scholar Cass Sunstein has a much more critical view of the Internet's impact. He argues that the Internet and the use of social media tend to produce echo chambers where people with similar interests classify into small groups of likeminded. This leads to polarisation and divisions within society, since citizens disregard the information and news that do not fit in their pre-existing notions. Scholar Kristin Lord also represents a pessimistic perspective on the Internet and the assumption that it brings peace and democracy. Lord argues that the new media's channels, for instance blogs also transmit damaging and false information and spread hate and conflict as easily as peace and democracy.

== Origin of blogging in Arab countries ==
The first country in the Arab world with Internet access was Tunisia in 1991. All other Arab countries followed suit in the next years until 2000.

Compared to other media which are often controlled by the government, the Internet gives its users access to many news source they are interested in. In this sense the Internet can be seen as a democratic medium that enables people to make their views public. The introduction of Web 2.0 in recent years increased the democratic effects since it provides its users an active use and participation. The Web 2.0 applications made the revolution of blogging possible. Initially a few bloggers, who wrote predominantly in English initiated the Arab blogosphere. Within a short time many people followed the blog entries and noted the advantages of blogging. Blogging enables people to spread their opinions faster than governments can control or censor it. Thereby citizens can obtain information that are usually not discussed in public and exchange their opinion concerning several themes. Like their global counterparts, Arab bloggers are not necessarily journalists. Each citizen with Internet access has the possibility to produce blog entries.
In 2003 the war in Iraq caused many bloggers to write about the local situation. The Iraqi architect Salam Pax, who daily wrote about the war horror is the most prominent of these pioneers. Salam Pax and other pioneers inspired an explosion of bloggers who expressed their opinions on themes that were usually not discussed in public. Blogs became increasingly an alternative to newspapers and television. After the technology for Arabic language writing improved and became more available, many bloggers start to blog in Arabic. Since then blogging is increasingly used in the Arab world. In 2006 approximately 40.000 blogs exist in the Arabic blogosphere and the number is still growing.

The Arab uprisings in 2011 have shown that bloggers can act as agents of change. Bloggers were effective in spreading information, mobilising citizens and circulating audio-visual materials about the excesses of government and their security forces.

== Analysing the Arabic blogosphere ==
In 2009 the Berkman Center for Internet and Society at Harvard University analysed the Arabic language blogosphere to investigate the impact of the Internet on democratic processes in countries with oppressive and authoritarian regimes. The Arabic blogosphere is a complex network that include bloggers from Arabic speaking countries and Arab expats living in the United States, South America or Europe. The findings of the study “Mapping the Arabic blogosphere: politics and dissent online“ indicate that in part of the Arabic blogosphere there is an emerging networked public sphere where citizens obtain information they are interested in and exchange their opinion concerning several topics.

== Methods ==
For the analysis the researchers used a methodical combination of social network analysis of the linking behaviour of Arab bloggers, automated text analysis of blog content and human coding of individual blogs. The research group analysed the structure and content of approximately 35.000 Arabic blogs collected between March 2008 and April 2009 and identified the most connected ones. Hence 6451 blogs were left, which represent the structural and conversational core of the Arabic blogosphere. Afterwards they divided the most connected blogs into different attentive clusters and they used text-mining techniques to identify the themes which interest each of the cluster. Furthermore, a team of Arabic speaking researchers conducted exploratory human coding of thousands of blogs to get more qualitative information about the blog content.

== Blog content ==
The researchers identified the below-mentioned topics that are overall discussed in the Arabic blogosphere.

- Local issues - bloggers in the Arab world pay more attention to their own local and national news and politics than to international news and politics. When they discuss their leaders they are more likely to criticise than to support them. Palestine and in particular the situation in Gaza is the most discussed political issue in the Arab world.
- Religion - religious issues are very popular in the Arabic blogosphere. Bloggers exchange mainly their religious thoughts and experiences, while political and theological aspects are secondary.
- Human Rights and Culture - human rights concerning civil and political issues are frequently discussed across the Arabic blogosphere followed by cultural topics, poetry, art, and pop culture.
- The United States - the US and its wars in Iraq or Afghanistan is not frequently discussed in the Arabic blogosphere. When bloggers write about the USA it is mainly in critical terms. The English Bridge and the Syrian cluster contain the most discussion of the USA.
- Terrorism - when discussing terrorism Arab bloggers are mainly critical of violent extremists. Only a very small proportion of bloggers express explicit support for terrorism. In general terrorism is more discussed in the Levantine/English Bridge and the Syrian cluster than others where it is not an important topic.

== Demographic data ==
- Age - Arab bloggers are predominantly young. About 75% of bloggers are younger than 35, while just 9% are older than 35 and almost none are older than 60 years of age.
- Gender - bloggers in the Arabic blogosphere tend to be male. 60% of bloggers are male, while only 34% are female. The highest proportion of men features the Maghreb/French Bridge (90% M) and the Syrian (87% M) clusters, while the Egyptian youth (47% F) sub-cluster contains the highest proportion of female bloggers.
- Anonymity - Altogether Arab bloggers are more likely to use their name when writing than to write anonymously or with an obvious pseudonym. In fact 64% of bloggers use their name when blogging, while only 36% write anonymously.

== Cluster description ==
The results of the study show a formation of nation-based clusters in the Arabic blogosphere. In this context a cluster can be described as a matched bundle of blogs with similar blog content and links to same online sources. The primary clusters that can be found in the Arabic blogosphere are summarised in the below-mentioned table. The table illustrates the main content of each cluster and demographic data about the bloggers in each cluster.

cluster	general information	blog content	age of bloggers	gender
Egypt	largest cluster in the Arabic blogosphere, contains several sub-clusters, bloggers are actively engaged in political movements	political discourse, criticism of Mubarak, human rights, poetry & literature, cultural issues, religion/Islam, support for campaigns (freeing bloggers, calling for reform, promoting social issues etc.)	-> no data available	bloggers are predominantly male
Saudi Arabia	second largest cluster in the Arabic blogosphere	personal issues, few political topics, preference for technology	-> no data available	46% female bloggers
Kuwaiti English	bloggers write mainly in English and prefer English language sources	international news and policy, economic issues, ethnic minorities, poetry, literature, support for the Western culture	77% of bloggers in the 25- to 35-year-old range	bloggers are predominantly male
Kuwaiti Arabic	bloggers write mainly in Arabic and prefer Arabic language sources	domestic news and policy, support for domestic leaders, Islam, pop culture	bloggers are younger than the Kuwaiti English group	bloggers are predominantly male
Levantine/ English Bridge	located in the countries of the eastern Mediterranean including Syria, Palestine, Jordan, Iraq, Lebanon	international news and policy, local affairs, human rights, women rights, Western culture, criticism of terrorism	->no data available	bloggers are predominantly male
Syria		criticism of domestic leaders, religious issues, criticism of Western culture	50% of bloggers in the 25- to 35-year-old range	87% male bloggers
Maghreb	located in Algeria, Morocco and Tunisia, language mix of Arabic English and French	criticism of domestic and foreign leaders, criticism of terrorism, human rights, poetry, literature, art	-> no data available	89% male bloggers
Islam - focus	loosely connected group of bloggers from several Arab countries	Islamic discourse, personal religious thoughts and experiences, policy	-> no data available	bloggers are predominantly male
