= Souad Al-Shammari =

Saudi Arabian women's rights activist

- سعاد الشمري
- Born: 5 July 1966 (age 58); Khafji, Saudi Arabia
- Occupation(s): activist, advocate for Saudi women's rights

Souad Al-Shammari, also transcribed as Souad Al-Shammary, and Suad Al-Shammari (Arabic: سعاد الشمري, born July 5, 1966) is a Saudi Arabian women's rights activist. She is well known for her opposition to Saudi Arabia's guardianship system which subordinates women's autonomy to the authority of male guardians. She has taken part in campaigns to lift the ban on women driving cars in Saudi Arabia. She is also the head of the Saudi Arabian Liberals Network, which is a network of activists peacefully calling for social and political reform and was associated with the activism of blogger and journalist Raif Badawi, co-founding the Saudi Liberal Network, and helped his wife Ensaf Haidar and their three children leave the country to avoid Raif's father claiming custody of them due to Raif's arrest.

Al-Shammari was detained without charge on 28 October 2014 after a four-hour interrogation session at the Bureau of Investigation and Prosecution in Jeddah and released on 29 January 2015 after signing a pledge to stop or "reduce" her activism.

== See also ==
- Raif Badawi
- Manal al Sharif
