= Dina Ali Lasloom =

Saudi-born repatriated asylum seeker (born 1993)

- دينا علي السلوم
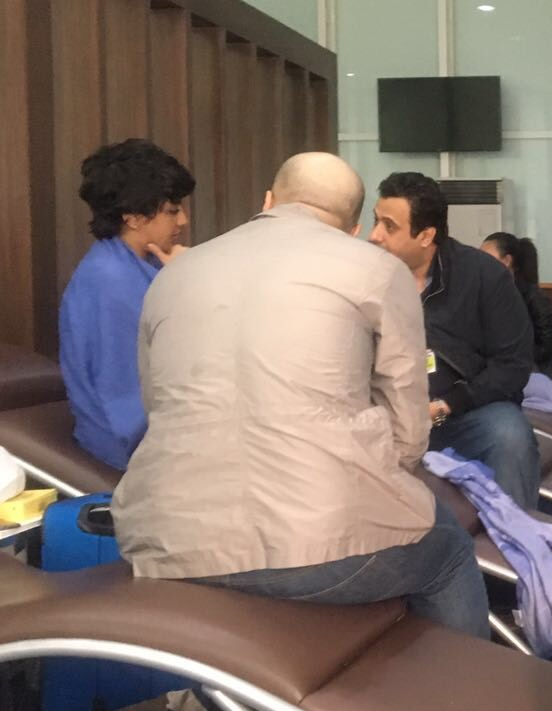
- Last known photo of Dina Ali (left), 10 April 2017, being confronted by her uncles in Manila
- Born: 29 March 1993; Saudi Arabia
- Disappeared: 12 April 2017 (aged 24); Riyadh, Saudi Arabia
- Status: Missing for 9 years, 6 months and 17 days
- Occupation: School teacher
- Known for: Attempting to flee Saudi Arabia
- Height: 5 ft 2 in (157 cm)

Dina Ali Lasloom (Arabic: دينا علي السلوم; born 29 March 1993) is a Saudi woman who attempted to seek asylum in Australia to escape Saudi guardianship laws, but was forcibly repatriated to Saudi Arabia from the Philippines. Her attempt to escape the Saudi law was frustrated when she was stopped in transit at Ninoy Aquino International Airport in Manila on 10 April 2017 and sent back to Saudi Arabia on 11 April 2017.

Lasloom's documents were confiscated by Filipino airport officials in the International Zone. Her case spread widely on social media after she recorded a video with the help of a Canadian tourist at the Manila airport, in which she said she feared her family would kill her if she was sent back to them. However, despite physically resisting, she was ultimately taken by her uncles onto a plane to Riyadh, Saudi Arabia on 11 April 2017.

This is a rare documented case in the history of female liberation in Saudi Arabia, bearing many parallels to that of Princess Misha'al. Madawi al-Rasheed, a visiting professor at the London School of Economics Middle East Centre, commented that Lasloom's case is "a classic... in which state and family cooperate against women in [the] KSA [Kingdom of Saudi Arabia]." Her case sparked global outrage with millions of sympathizers around the world.

== Events at the airport ==
The role Philippines authorities played in Lasloom's return is unclear. As a party to the 1951 Refugee Convention and the Convention against Torture, the Philippines has an obligation not to return anyone to a territory where they face persecution because of their sex or a real risk of torture or cruel, inhuman, and degrading treatment. While on a layover in the Philippines, Lasloom was allegedly detained by the Philippines authorities and held until male relatives from Saudi Arabia could arrive and return her to their home. A video posted on Twitter purports to be her testimony before being kidnapped and returned to Saudi Arabia. No face is shown in the video. In the testimony, she claimed that she would be killed upon return to her family.

Lasloom stated in the self-recorded video that the Philippine authorities had held her at the Manila airport, and confiscated her passport. She is quoted to have said, "My name is Dina Ali and I'm a Saudi woman who fled Saudi Arabia to Australia to seek asylum. If my family come they will kill me. If I go back to Saudi Arabia I will be dead." The video has been circulated widely on social media. A Canadian tourist allowed Lasloom to use her phone, and shared her witness account.

Dina told the airport workers that she was in danger the entire time. Several times she cried hysterically to them that she needed help. They ignored her. They looked at her like she didn’t exist.

A second video later surfaced, showing Lasloom arguing with a woman whom Lasloom identified to that tourist as a representative from the Kuwait Embassy: "He is not my father, he is not my father, he is not my father. You are not helping, you don't know him," referring to her uncle. Another witness published a video on YouTube where several security personnel are seen and Lasloom is heard screaming in the background from the airport in Manila.^{[26]}

Calls by activists to the police department at Manila International airport were not answered on the night of Tuesday 11 April 2017. It is understood that the airport confirmed Lasloom's detention with an Amnesty International representative. Philippine President Rodrigo Duterte began a three-day state visit to Saudi Arabia on 10 April, the same day Lasloom attempted to fly to Australia.

Initially, Filipino officials denied any knowledge of Lasloom being detained. However, they later confirmed her detention, but attempted to shift blame onto the Saudi government and airline: "As far as immigration is concerned, we did not hold any Saudi national." The spokeswoman said that if Lasloom was a transiting passenger, then she would not have passed through immigration and it would have been up to the airline to decide what happened to her.

The Filipino government has been widely condemned by many groups for their poor response to the situation, including Human Rights Watch director Kenneth Roth, who described it as appalling.

The only information provided to why Lasloom's transfer to Sydney was stopped by the Filipino airport authorities was that a very important person had called and told them to hold her documents, without further information.

== Forced boarding of flight to Riyadh ==
Saudi activists said Lasloom was forced onto a Saudi Arabia Airlines flight from Manila to Riyadh on the night of Tuesday 11 April 2017. A Saudi feminist who obtained the video from an eyewitness reported that Lasloom was forced onto the plane by her two diplomat uncles and Filipino police. Human Rights Watch interviewed four people linked to Lasloom's case, including two who said they had spoken to her at Manila's Ninoy Aquino International Airport.

Feminist activist Moudhi Aljohani, who claims to have talked to Lasloom on the phone, is quoted in a report in The Australian saying Lasloom avoided a first attempt to force her onto a plane to Saudi Arabia "by screaming and physically resisting, attracting the attention of other passengers." A video of the incident was released on YouTube.

An airline security official told Human Rights Watch that he saw two airline security officials and three apparently Middle Eastern men enter the hotel and go to her room, which he said was near the lobby. He said he heard her screaming and begging for help from her room, after which he saw them carry her out with duct tape on her mouth, feet, and hands. He said she was still struggling to break free when he saw them put her in a wheelchair and take her out of the hotel.

A witness quoted in The Australian said she saw a woman being pulled out of a room with her mouth taped shut, and her body was wrapped in a sheet. This is assumed to have been done by her two uncles and a member of the Saudi Embassy. "They weren't Filipino. They looked Arab," another woman, who declined to give her name, told The Australian. A third witness claimed to have seen "A security officer and three middle eastern men doing this". She was later forced onto a Saudi Arabian Airlines flight, the pilots and crew of which were reportedly aware and supportive of Lasloom being returned to Riyadh against her will, siding heavily with her uncles.

Despite conflicting reports at the time about whether or not Lasloom was in fact on the flight, passengers in route to Riyadh began reporting on social media that there was a hostage aboard, prompting the governments of Oman and Qatar to refuse the aircraft passage through their airspace. While only confirmed to confidential sources and not officially verified, this is supported by flight path records, which show an abrupt change in direction and trajectory to avoid the airspace of Oman and Qatar.

== Arrival at Riyadh ==
Police presence was heavy outside King Abdulaziz International Airport the night Lasloom arrived. Saudi campaigners reported that she was seen arriving in the country in a wheelchair, while multiple passengers exiting the airport told Reuters they had seen a woman being carried onto the plane screaming, before taking off in Manila, Philippines.

A rare gathering of about 10 Saudi activists appeared in the arrivals area of the Riyadh airport around midnight on 12 April 2017, after a hashtag began circulating on social media urging people to "receive Dina at the airport." Two of them, Alaa Anazi, a 23-year-old medical student, and a 27-year-old male, were detained after approaching airport security about the case. Anazi's sister confirmed that airport officials had told her Alaa had been sent to a police station in central Riyadh, but said she was unable to confirm her sister's whereabouts.

Saudi-based journalist Vivien Nereim, who was at the airport, said there were no signs of the young girl, but confirmed the Saudi Human Rights Commission was following the case. She did however collect testimonies from witnesses on the plane who described "a woman being carried on the flight screaming", suggesting that she was brought onto the plane against her will, which is illegal in the Philippines according to the Republic Act 9208, as this happened in the International zone, where Philippine law applies. Two other witnesses stated they heard her cry for help, but it was impossible to determine her condition because she was covered.

The Saudi embassy in the Philippines confirmed that the citizen had returned to Saudi Arabia, adding that what had happened was a "family affair":

The Embassy of the Custodian of the Two Holy Mosques in the Republic of the Philippines confirms the incorrectness of what has been circulated on some social media platforms... what happened was a family matter and the citizen returned home with the family.

The event brought to the forefront women's rights in Saudi Arabia and male guardianship laws. While some social media users rushed to her aid, others called for her to be killed for stepping out of line with Saudi society.

== Whereabouts ==
Amid ongoing public outcry, Lasloom's current whereabouts remain unknown. Sources stated that she is held at the Correctional Facility for Women in Riyadh while further procedures are being taken by the authorities in her case. On 19 April 2017, a Saudi government official with knowledge of the case, who spoke on condition of anonymity, told Bloomberg that she was being held in a detention facility for women aged under 30 as a precaution and does not face any charges, and authorities are trying to find "appropriate solutions" to allow her to live a normal life.

Moudhi Aljohani said Lasloom's uncles hit her and told her they would kill her when they landed in Saudi Arabia. "It is most likely that she is not alive," Aljohani said in her emotional video. She criticized rights organizations for doing little to aid in the situation and then called on people not to be silent. Mohamed al-Maady from the government-led Human Rights Commission in Saudi Arabia said the organisation would be coordinating with the Saudi ministry of social development to gather information on the case. No information was available in relation to her physical or mental wellbeing. She is at risk of legal sanctions under the charge of “disobedience” because of her attempt to escape from her guardian.

Human Rights Watch called on Saudi Arabia to reveal whether Lasloom is with her family or is being held by the state at a shelter. "If held by the state, the authorities should disclose under what conditions she is being held, including whether she is at a shelter at her request and whether she has freedom of movement and ability to contact the outside world."

== Aftermath ==
Lasloom's story triggered protest outside Saudi embassies in several countries around the world, most notably by the Labour Party in Ireland. The Labour Party also demanded to know if Ireland was among European UN members which voted Saudi Arabia onto the UN Commission on the Status of Women, the Irish government responded by refusing to disclose how they voted.

A campaign was also started by Human Rights Watch, instructing social media users to tweet Saudi King Salman using the hashtag #SaveDinaAli, urging a royal pardon.

The case continues to receive widespread media coverage due to the extreme and legally questionable nature of Lasloom's extradition.

On 7 May 2017, Russia Today published an entire segment on the event. The report came a day after United States President Donald Trump announced a foreign trip to Saudi Arabia, highlighting increased economic and political ties with the kingdom, while a deep cultural divide remains. A day earlier, a royal decree allowing women greater access to government services was passed.

On 28 May 2017 BBC World Service aired a segment chronicling Lasloom's attempted escape.

On 8 June 2017, Americans for Democracy & Human Rights in Bahrain (ADHRB) organized a side event during the UN Human Rights Council's 35th session, in which Lasloom's case was a discussion topic.

Following reportage of Lasloom's story by Norwegian Public Broadcaster NRK, several parliamentarians, including Socialist Left Party Leader Audun Lysbakken and Abid Raja, requested foreign minister Ine Marie Eriksen Søreide take up the women's rights situation with Saudi Arabia. "This is an extreme form of gender apartheid. I would like to ask, if the Foreign Minister agrees, that Norway raise the matter with Saudi Arabia." said parliamentary representative Jan Bøhler.

On 6 September 2018, Saudi Arabian sisters aged 18 and 20 fled their guardians while on a family vacation in Sri Lanka, and flew to Hong Kong, with the intention of seeking asylum in Australia. Their case made international headlines when their deadline for asylum passed in February 2019, during which time they cited fears of being returned to Saudi Arabia like Dina Ali Lasloom.

On 4 February 2019, Dina's story and the stories of several women who fled Saudi Arabia were the subject of ABC News Australia's long-running documentary series Four Corners.

== See also ==
- Human rights in Saudi Arabia
- Islamic feminism
- List of people who disappeared mysteriously: post-1970
- List of kidnappings
