= Sara bint Talal Al Saud =

Saudi royal

Names
- Sara bint Talal bin Abdulaziz bin Abdul Rahman bin Faisal Al Saud
- House: Al Saud
- Father: Talal bin Abdulaziz
- Mother: Moudie bint Abdul Mohsen Al Angari

Sara bint Talal Al Saud (Arabic: سارة بنت طلال بن عبد العزيز آل سعود) is a Saudi princess and the daughter of Prince Talal.

== Background and family ==
Sara bint Talal was raised in Riyadh in the household of her father. Her mother, Moudie bint Abdul Mohsen Al Angari (died 2008), was the third wife of Prince Talal. Sara has a full-brother, Turki bin Talal. Among her half-brothers is the notorious plutocrat, Al Waleed.

Sara was nicknamed "little Barbie" because of her beauty and her fondness for material well-being, but she was educated by a strict English governess. After studies at the King Saud University in Riyadh, she married a royal cousin, but got divorced when still in her twenties. She is the mother of four children.

== Activities ==
In the mid-2000s, Princess Sara was reported to be running a local charity, namely Down's Syndrome Riyadh charity, in Saudi Arabia.

== Political asylum request ==
After Crown Prince Abdullah became king in August 2005, she stated that her father was also a contender for the Saudi throne. She also told the AFP "We, the Saudi people, want a clearer mechanism for succession... All (members of the royal family) agreed on Crown Prince Abdullah, given that he is the eldest and best qualified. Prince Sultan was also agreed upon to become crown prince. But what happens next?" She accompanied her father while he was ambassador to UNICEF, visiting refugee camps. However, she later had a falling out with her father. BBC reports that she has been living in the United Kingdom since 2007 with her four children. The reason was reported to be a conflict with her father, and she told the press "my father wanted to crush me." The quarrel with her father led her to be protected by her uncle, the late Crown Prince Nayef bin Abdulaziz, a rival of her father, until his death in June 2012. Within a month of Nayef's death, Sara sought political asylum for herself and for her children in the United Kingdom on 8 July 2012, claiming fear from political threats on her family. It was the first case of a senior member of the Saudi ruling family seeking political asylum. Immediately after her request for political asylum, and apparently in order to improve her credentials to get asylum, Princess Sara told the press that she wanted to see reform in Saudi Arabia and wanted to fight against corruption in that country.
