= Mikhlif Alshammari =

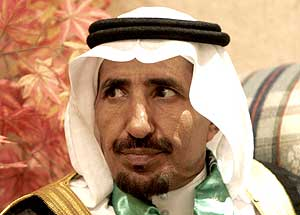
Mikhlif Alshammari in 2012

Mikhlif Alshammari (Arabic: مخلف الشمري; born 21 February 1955) is a Saudi Arabian Sunni writer and human rights activist. He was sanctioned on several occasions by the Saudi government for his pro-Shia sympathy. He was born in Baq'a, Ha'il.

== Education ==
Alshammari holds a BBA in Business Administration from Armstrong College (California), Berkeley, California, United States 1987. SPM 2003.

== Work experience ==
Mikhlif Alshammari was one of the leaders of the Shammar tribe. He was a writer and critic for several Saudi newspapers. After being banned from writing, he continued to publish his articles on the internet.

He was well known as a human rights defender and advocate of reforming democracy. Also, he was one of the promoters to unite the Sunni with the Shiites under one umbrella. He was trusted by international organizations like by Human Rights Watch, Human Rights Council, Front Line Defenders, Amnesty International and ALKarama HR Org. He was self-employed as a director of his own contracting company "DAHAMCO".

In 2007, Mr. Alshammari's company went bankrupt as a result of his arrest without charge by the General Investigation in Dammam. After he was released from that arbitrary detention and tasted the injustice, he changed his career totally. He became a human rights defender and worked a full-time human right defender to help oppressed people, men and women, Saudis and non-Saudis at all levels.

Due to his activities and his writings, Alshammari was detained three times in four years. The last arrest took place on 15 June 2010, accused of "annoying others."

In 2013, he was sentenced to five years in prison for exposing human rights abuses in Saudi Arabia.

In 2015, he was sentenced to two years in prison and 200 lashes for "associating with Shia Muslims".

== Activities ==
- Founder of Environment's Friends organization in the Eastern Province.
- Founder and Chairman of Shammar Tribe Board in the Eastern Province.
- Was invited as an independents activist by the High Commissioner to the United Nations to report on the status of women in Saudi Arabia.
- Attended several human rights training workshops.
- Arranged and participated in the first Friday prayer between Shiites and Sunnis in Qatif area.
- Worked to resolve many family and tribal disputes including the revenge disputes.

== Memberships ==
- Member and collaborator with the Saudi Human Rights Commission (until his latest arrest)
- An active member of the National Family Safety Program, Riyadh
- Member of WHO's WHO OF professional international
- Member of the Saudi Management Association
- Member of the Saudi Cancer Society

== Awards ==
- Shield trophy from the Forum Dialogue between different Cultures
- Shield trophy of trust from "Shammar" Tribe
