= Olayan =

Olayan or Al-Olayan is a surname. Notable people with the surname include:

- Lubna Olayan (born 1955), Saudi businesswoman
- Madallah Al-Olayan (born 1994), Saudi footballer
- Suliman S. Olayan (1918–2006), Saudi businessman
