= Women's rights in Saudi Arabia =

General statistics
- Maternal mortality (per 100,000): 12 (2015)
- Women in parliament: 20% (2016)
- Women over 25 with secondary education: 77.2% (2020)
- Women in labour force: 37.0% (2022)

Gender Inequality Index (2021)
- Value: 0.247
- Rank: 59th out of 191

Global Gender Gap Index (2024)
- Value: 0.647
- Rank: 126th out of 146

Women's rights in Saudi Arabia are heavily affected by Islamic and local traditions of the Arabian Peninsula. Wahhabism, the official version of Sunni Islam in Saudi Arabia, as well as traditions of the Arabian Peninsula and national and local laws all impact women's societal roles in Saudi Arabia.

Women in Saudi Arabia have experienced many legal reforms since 2017, after facing fundamentalist Sahwa dominance for decades. However, according to Human Rights Watch and Amnesty International, Saudi women are still discriminated against in terms of marriage, family, and divorce despite the reforms, and the Saudi government continues to target and repress women's rights activists and movements. Prominent feminist campaigns include the Women to Drive Movement and the anti male-guardianship campaign, which have led to significant advances in women's rights.

== Rankings ==
The World Economic Forum's Global Gender Gap Report 2025 ranked Saudi Arabia as number 132 out of 146 countries, a significant drop if compared to previous years. However, in the World Bank's 2021 Women, Business, and the Law index, Saudi Arabia scored 80 out of 100, an above-average global score. The United Nations Economic and Social Council (ECOSOC) elected Saudi Arabia to the U.N. Commission on the Status of Women for 2018 to 2022, a move that was widely criticized internationally. According to the World Bank, Saudi Arabia has been making significant improvements to women's working conditions since 2017, addressing issues of mobility, sexual harassment, pensions, and workplace rights including employment discrimination protection.

== Civil rights ==
=== Representation in government ===
Women's representation in Saudi Arabia's government has gradually evolved, marking a notable shift in political inclusion amid broader social reforms. In 2009, Norah al-Fayez became the first female minister, serving as the Deputy Minister of Education for Girls’ Affairs from 2009 until 2015. In January 2013, King Abdullah issued a royal decree mandating that 20% of the 150-member Shura Council be women. He then appointed 30 female members to satisfy the requirement.

In 2019, Princess Reema bint Bandar Al Saud was appointed as the Saudi ambassador to the US, becoming the first female envoy in the Kingdom's history. Since then, Saudi Arabia has appointed several women to ambassadorial roles. In October 2020, Amal bint Yahya al‑Moallimi became the second Saudi female ambassador, appointed to Norway and later accredited to Canada. This was followed in April 2021 by the appointment of Inas bint Ahmed al‑Shahwan as Ambassador to Sweden and Iceland.

In January 2023, two more female diplomats were sworn in: Haifa al‑Jadea was appointed as Ambassador and Head of Mission to the European Union and EAEC, while Nisreen bint Hamad al‑Shibel became Ambassador to Finland. That same year, Princess Haifa bint Abdulaziz Al‑Mogrin, previously Saudi Arabia's Permanent Delegate to UNESCO, was appointed Ambassador to Spain.

=== Freedom of movement ===
In September 2017, after Mohammed bin Salman was named as Crown Prince, a royal decree was issued allowing women to drive, lifting the decades-old ban. The next month, women were allowed into sports stadiums.

2019 saw significant progress on women's rights in the country, with the removal of some restrictions related to the male guardianship system, granting women over 21 the right to apply for passports, and to travel and work without permission, as well as allowing women over 18 to register births, deaths, marriages, and divorces. As well as ending gender segregation in restaurants, restrictions on some jobs were lifted, such as allowing women to serve in the armed forces.

=== Education ===
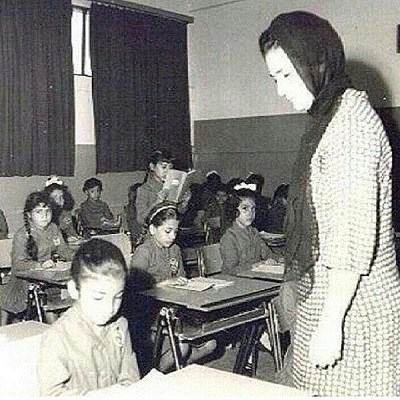
Iffat bint Mohammad Al Thunayan was an activist and pioneer for women's education in Saudi Arabia.

In 2021, female literacy was estimated at 93%, not far behind that of men. The 2021 data stands in stark contrast to that of 1970, when only 2% of women and 15% of men were literate. More women receive secondary and tertiary education than men; 56% of all university graduates in Saudi Arabia were women as of 2019, and in 2008, 50% of working women had a college education, compared to 16% of working men. As of 2019, Saudi women make up 34.4% of the native work force of Saudi Arabia. The proportion of Saudi women graduating from universities is higher than in Western countries.

One of Saudi Arabia's official educational policies is to promote "belief in the one God, Islam as the way of life, and Muhammad as God's Messenger." Official policy particularly emphasizes religion in the education of girls: "The purpose of educating a girl is to bring her up in a proper Islamic way so as to perform her duty in life, be an ideal and successful housewife and a good mother, ready to do things which suit her nature such as teaching, nursing and medical treatment." The policy also specifies "women's right[s] to obtain suitable education on equal footing with men in light of Islamic laws." Saudi women often specify education as the most important area for women's rights reform.

Saudi Arabia is the home of Princess Nourah Bint Abdul Rahman University, the world's largest women-only university. Religious beliefs about gender roles and the perception that education is more relevant for men has resulted in fewer educational opportunities for women. The tradition of sex segregation in professional life is used to justify restricting women's fields of study. Traditionally, women have been excluded from fields such as engineering, pharmacy, architecture, and law. This has changed slightly in recent years; in 2021, nearly 60% of all Saudi university students were female. Some fields, such as law and pharmacy, are beginning to open up for women. Though Saudi women can also study any subject they wish while abroad, the customs of male guardianship and purdah curtail this. In 1992, three times as many men studied abroad on government scholarships, although the ratio had been near 50% in the early 1980s.

=== Business and property ===
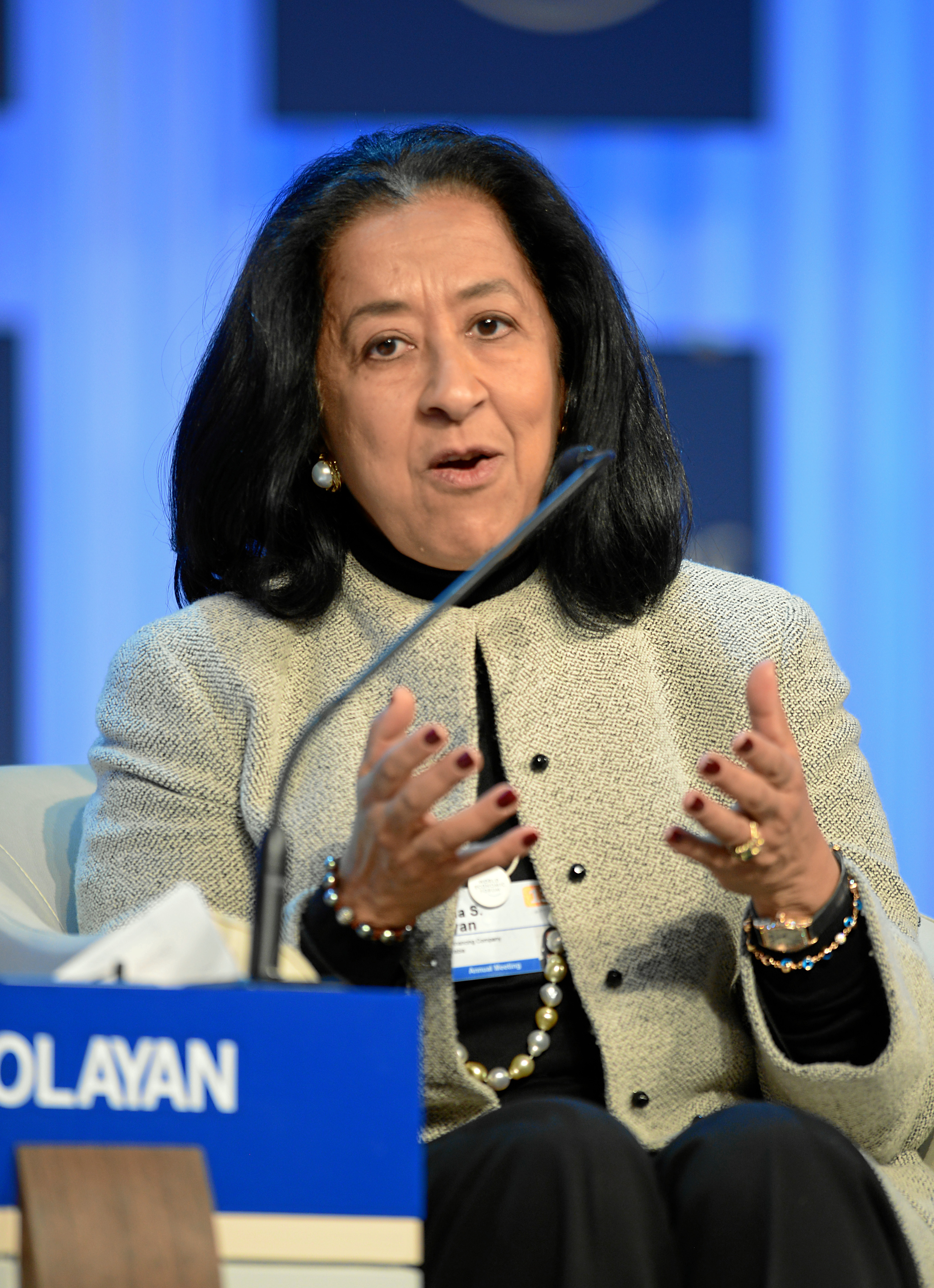
Lubna Olayan, an influential Saudi businesswoman, speaking at the World Economic Forum

There are certain limitations on businesswomen in Saudi Arabia. Although now able to drive motor vehicles, a woman still cannot swear for herself in a court of law; a man has to swear for her. However, as part of the Saudi 2030 Vision, women have recently been encouraged to buy and own houses, either with partners or independently. This is part of Saudi Arabia's plan to increase Saudi ownership of houses to 70% by 2030. According to a World Bank study titled "Women, Business and the Law 2020," which tracks how laws affect women in 190 economies, Saudi Arabia's economy scored 70.6 points out of 100, a dramatic increase from its previous score of 31.8 points. "2019 was a year of 'groundbreaking' reforms that allowed women greater economic opportunity in Saudi Arabia, according to the study's findings," said an Al Arabiya article on the report.

=== Sport ===
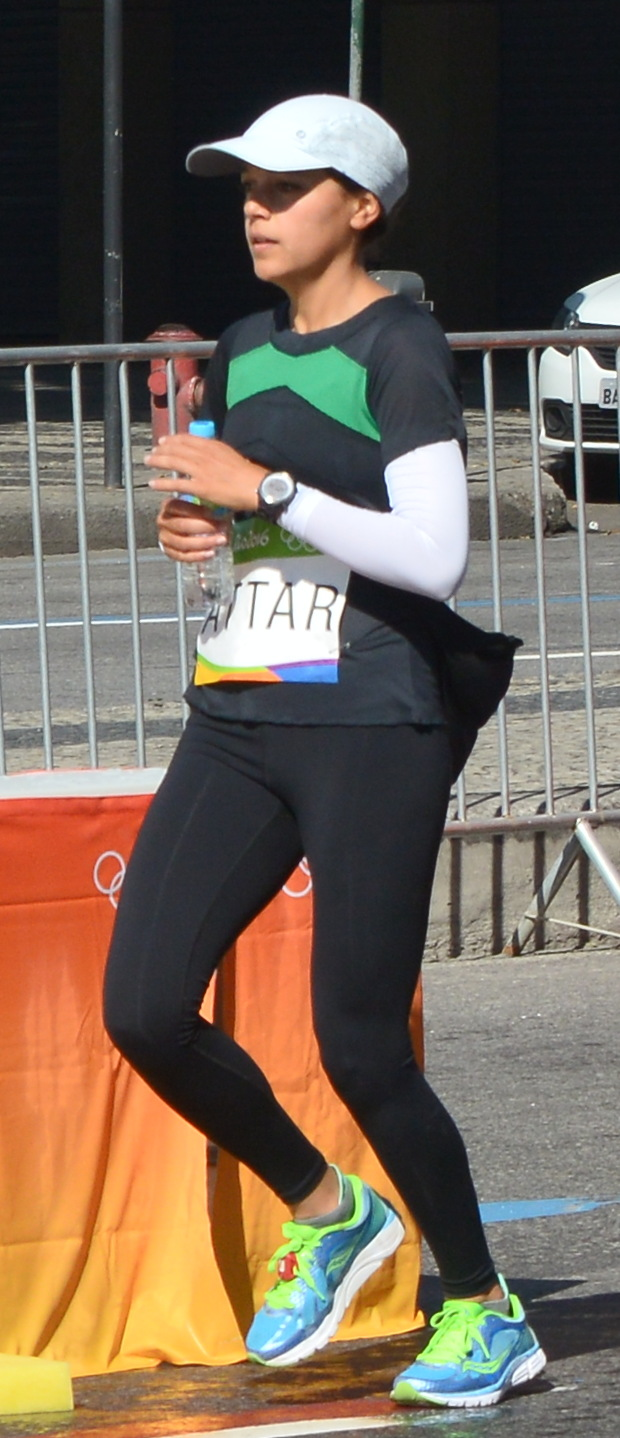
Sarah Attar is a track and field athlete who competed at the 2012 Summer Olympics as one of the first two female Olympians representing Saudi Arabia. She also competed in the marathon at the 2016 Olympics.

Saudi Arabia was one of the few countries in the 2008 Olympics without a female delegation, although it does have female athletes.

In June 2012, the Saudi Arabian Embassy in London announced that female athletes would compete in the Olympics in 2012 in London, England, for the first time. Saudi blogger Eman al-Nafjan commented that as of 2012, Saudi girls are prevented from sports education at school, and that Saudi women have very little access to sports facilities. She also said that the two Saudi women who participated in the 2012 Olympics, runner Sarah Attar (who grew up in the United States) and judoka Wojdan Shaherkani, attracted both criticism and support on Twitter; and that Jasmine Alkhaldi, a Filipino swimmer born to a Saudi father, was widely supported by the online Saudi community.

In 2013, the Saudi government sanctioned sports for girls in private schools for the first time.

By 2017, some restrictions in Saudi Arabia started to change. Mohammed bin Salman declared that by 2018, women would be allowed into sports stadiums. In September 2017, women were allowed to enter King Fahd Stadium for the first time for a celebration commemorating the Kingdom's 87th anniversary. They were seated in a specific section for families. Though welcomed by many, the move drew backlash from conservatives holding on to the country's strict gender segregation rules.

When WWE began holding televised events in Saudi Arabia in 2018, the company initially announced that female wrestlers would not be allowed to participate. On October 30, 2019, the promotion announced that Lacey Evans and Natalya would take part in the country's first professional wrestling match involving women at that year's edition of WWE Crown Jewel. However, both wrestlers had to substitute their usual revealing attire for bodysuits that covered their arms and legs.

Women's football in Saudi Arabia made great strides in 2022, with the women's national team competing in, and winning, their first international match by the score of 2–0 against Seychelles. Later that year in December, Saudi Arabia made a bid to host the 2026 AFC Women's Asian Cup. Monika Staab, the manager of the Saudi Arabian women's national team, said: "This is an opportunity to bring the tournament to life, inspire a generation, and turbo-charge the continued growth of women's football."

=== Women's entrepreneurship on the rise ===
Vision 2030 is introducing women to new levels of leadership and economic empowerment. In Saudi Arabia, women entrepreneurs are now managing more small and medium enterprises (SMEs). The number of female entrepreneurs has increased more than 35% over the last decade in 2017.

Alhanoof Alzahrani, the co-founder of Saudi Arabia's first crowdfunding company, "Scopeer," expressed her excitement and optimism about greater opportunities for Saudi women in business. She said: "Amid the economic diversification and push for women's empowerment, opportunities are everywhere. You just must be creative and willing to take risks." Alzahrani added that the technology sector in Saudi Arabia will offer pockets of opportunity for local and foreign investors: "The country's push for digitalization is expected to generate demand for technology talents, as well as service providers in supporting technology development. We are more than happy to establish collaboration with Hong Kong, which is known to be a technology and innovation hub in Asia."

Several initiatives and programs have been launched in the country to support entrepreneurship. The General Authority for Small and Medium Enterprises (Monsha'at) has introduced initiatives to reduce the administrative and regulatory hurdles that face SMEs and launched the Meras support center. Workshops and training programs are also offered under the Badir Technology Incubators and Accelerators Program to promote an entrepreneurial culture among women university students.

=== Employment ===
According to the Saudi General Authority for Statistics, Saudi women constitute 33.2% of the native workforce as of 2020. The rate of participation has grown from 14% in 1990 to 33.2% in 2020. Between 2018 and 2020, the proportion of women in the native workforce increased from 20.2% to 33.2%. In February 2019, a report was released indicating that 48% of Saudi nationals working in the retail sector were women.

Some critics complain that women's skills are not being effectively used, since women make up 70% of students in Saudi institutes of higher education. Some jobs taken by women in almost every other country are reserved for men in Saudi Arabia. For example, the Saudi delegation to the United Nations International Women's Year conference in Mexico City in 1975 and the Decade for Women conference in Nairobi in 1985 were made up entirely of men. Geraldine Brooks wrote, "Even jobs directly concerned with women's affairs were held by men."

Historically, women's employment has been restricted under Saudi law and culture. In 2006, the Labor Minister Dr. Ghazi Al-Qusaibi said:

The [Labor] Ministry is not acting to [promote] women's employment since the best place for a woman to serve is in her own home ... therefore no woman will be employed without the explicit consent of her guardian. We will also make sure that the [woman's] job will not interfere with her work at home with her family, or with her eternal duty of raising her children ...

Furthermore, women's work must also have been deemed suitable for the female physique and mentality. Women have been allowed to work only in capacities in which they can exclusively serve other women; there must have been no contact or interaction with the opposite gender. A woman's work should not cause her to travel without a close male relative. This has presented considerable problems, as women were not allowed to drive motor vehicles until 2018, and little to no public transportation exists in the Kingdom. Before women were allowed to drive, most working women traveled to work without a male relative out of necessity.

A World Bank report found that, since 2017, Saudi Arabia has made "the biggest improvement globally" in issues of women's mobility, sexual harassment, retirement age and economic activity. The Kingdom fixed a woman's retirement age at 60, the same as men, thus stretching their earnings and contributions. According to Al Arabiya, "Amendments were adopted to protect women from discrimination in employment, to prohibit employers from dismissing a woman during her pregnancy and maternity leave, and to prohibit gender-based discrimination in accessing financial services."

In October 2018, the Saudi government issued a resolution that prohibits wage discrimination for women who perform work similar to their male counterparts in the private sector,

According to the Saudi Ministry of Finance, female labor participation has reached 35% in 2024, exceeding the Saudi Vision 2030 target of 30%.

Current Saudi law ensures equal pay for women and men in both the private and public sectors.

=== Military ===
Saudi Arabia opened non-combat military jobs to women in February 2018. This followed a series of reforms enacted by Crown Prince Mohammed Bin Salman to advance the rights of women in Saudi Arabia.

In January 2020, the chief of staff of the Saudi Arabian Armed Forces, General Fayyadh Al-Ruwaili, inaugurated the first women's military wing, allowing women to join combat military positions in all branches of the armed forces.

In 2009, the King appointed Norah al-Faiz as deputy minister for women's education; she was the first female cabinet-level official.

In 2019, a new diploma in criminal law was made available to women.

In July 2020, Saudi Minister of Education, Hamad bin Mohammed Al Al-Sheikh, appointed Lilac AlSafadi as president of the Saudi Electronic University. She is the first female president of a co-ed Saudi university.

== Timeline of female empowerment in Saudi Arabia ==
- In 1955, Queen Iffat opened the first private school for girls in Jeddah.
- In 1960, King Saud issued a royal decree that made state schools accessible for girls all around the country.
- In 1970, the first higher education institution for women was founded.
- In 1999, Saudi Arabia agreed to issue women national ID cards.
- In 2005, Saudi Arabia banned forced marriages.
- In 2009, the first Saudi female minister was appointed to the Cabinet.
- In 2011, King Abdullah made provision for women to vote for the first time, in the 2015 local elections and to be appointed to the Consultative Assembly, the national legislature.
- In 2012, Saudi women were allowed to compete in the Summer Olympics for the first time.
- In 2013, women were permitted to ride motorbikes and bicycles in recreational areas.
- Since 2013, the Consultative Assembly has required that women must hold at least 20% of seats.
- In February 2017, Saudi Arabia appointed the first woman to chair the national stock exchange, the largest stock market in the Middle East.
- In May 2017, King Salman ordered that women should be allowed access to government services, such as education and healthcare, without needing consent from a male guardian.
- In September 2017, King Salman issued a decree allowing women to drive, lifting the decades-old ban on female drivers.
- As of October 2017, women were allowed into sport stadiums.
- In 2018, public statements by crown prince Mohammed bin Salman and legislation restricting the powers of the religious police led many Saudi women to abandon wearing hijab in public.
- In November 2018, the Saudi government issued a resolution that prohibits wage discrimination for women who perform work similar to their male counterparts in the private sector.
- In January 2019, the Saudi Supreme Court issued a law requiring courts to notify women of divorce via text. Previously, guardian laws allowed men to divorce their wives without notice, a policy that left many women disoriented and homeless.
- As of 1 August 2019, women have the right to register for divorce and marriage, apply for passports and other official documents, and travel abroad without their guardian's permission. The laws also extend employment discrimination protections to women, allow them to register as co-head of a household, live independently from their husband, and become eligible for the guardianship of minors.
- In October 2019, the Saudi Ministry of Defense stated that women can join the senior ranks of the military.
- In December 2019, the Saudi government banned marriage for under-18s of both sexes.
- In August 2020, the Saudi Cabinet approved an amendment that deletes the articles which prohibited women from working at night and working in hazardous jobs and industries.
- As of January 2021, women can now change their personal data, such as their family name, name of children, and their marital status, without a guardian's permission.
- Beginning in June 2021, Saudi Arabia allowed single, divorced, or widowed women to live independently without permission from their male guardians.
- As of July 2021, the Saudi Ministry of Hajj and Umrah has allowed women to register to perform the Hajj without being accompanied by a mahram.
- In February 2022, the Saudi Arabia women's national football team competed in, and won, their first ever international match, a friendly against the Seychelles by the score of 2–0 in Malé, Maldives.
- In March 2022, Muslim women over the age of 45 were allowed to perform the Umrah without a male guardian. Shortly thereafter, a new decision was announced allowing Muslim women under 45 years old to travel without a male guardian to perform both the Hajj and Umrah rites.
- In July 2022, the first woman deputy secretary-general of the Saudi Cabinet was appointed.
- In September 2022, Saudi Arabia appointed the first woman to chair the Saudi Human Rights Commission.
- On 22 September 2022, Saudi Arabia announced it would send its first woman into space in early 2023 as part of the Saudi Space Commission's new space program.
- On 5 January 2023, FIFA appointed the first female Saudi international referee.
- On 11 January 2023, King Salman approved an amendment of the Saudi nationality law that allows Saudi women married to foreign men to pass on Saudi citizenship to their children. This represents a major change to the kingdom's citizenship laws, and it has been debated since 2016.
- In May 2023, 22-year-old Afrah Al-Harbi became Saudi Arabia's first woman to obtain a pilot's license to operate a hot air balloon.
- In September 2023, Reem Filmban became the first Saudi woman to become a certified helicopter pilot. Filmbam travelled to the United States to receive her pilots license after completing high school in Saudi Arabia. Also that month, the General Authority of Civil Aviation named Ibtisam Al Shihri the organization's first woman spokesperson.
- In December 2023, the country hosted its first Women in Aviation General Assembly to further encourage women's participation in aviation. Saudi Vision 2030 intends to increase women's participation in the workforce to 30 percent by 2030.
- In April 2024, newly formed flag carrier Riyadh Air announced the launch of an all-female aircraft engineering program. The inaugural group comprises twenty-seven women selected from a vast pool of applicants for outstanding academic records for the 30-month diploma course. Selected from thousands of applicants, their participation underlines Riyadh Air's dedication to diversity, inclusion and workforce development, in line with Saudi Vision 2030's goal of empowering women.

== Background ==
Gender roles in Saudi society come from local culture and interpretations of Sharia law, or the divine will. Scholars of the Quran and hadith (sayings and accounts of Muhammad's life) derive its interpretations. In Saudi culture, the Sharia is interpreted according to a strict Sunni Islam form known as the way of the Salaf (righteous predecessors) or Wahhabism. The law is mostly unwritten, leaving judges with significant discretionary power, which they usually exercise in favor of tribal traditions. Activists such as Wajeha al-Huwaider compared the condition of Saudi women in 2007 to slavery.

Varying interpretations have led to controversy. For example, Sheikh Ahmed Qassim Al-Ghamdi, chief of the Mecca region's Islamic religious police, the Committee for the Promotion of Virtue and the Prevention of Vice, also known as the mutaween, has said that Sharia does not prohibit ikhtilat (gender mixing). Meanwhile, Abdul-Rahman al-Barrak, another prominent cleric, issued a fatwa stating that proponents of ikhtilat should be killed.

According to the Encyclopedia of Human Rights, sex segregation is a key aspect of Islamic legal theory used to curtail women's rights. The Sharia legal notion of 'shielding from corruption' (dar al-fasaad) justifies this segregation.

Many Saudis do not see Islam itself as the main impediment to women's rights, and "It's the culture, not the religion" is a common Saudi saying. According to the Library of Congress, customs of the Arabian peninsula also affect women's places in Saudi society. The peninsula is the ancestral home of patriarchal, nomadic tribes, in which separation of women and men, and namus (honour), are considered central. According to one female journalist, "If the Qu'ran does not address the subject, then the clerics will err on the side of caution and make it haram [forbidden]. The driving ban for women is the best example." Sabria Jawhar has stated, "if all women were given the rights the Qu'ran guarantees us, and not be supplanted by tribal customs, then the issue of whether Saudi women have equal rights would be reduced."

Saudis often invoke the life of Muhammad to prove that Islam allows for strong women. His first wife, Khadijah, was a powerful businesswoman who employed him and proposed marriage on her own. His wife Aisha commanded an army at the Battle of Bassorah and is the source of many hadiths.

The level of enforcement of various rules can vary by region: Jeddah is relatively permissive, while Riyadh and the surrounding Najd region, origin of the House of Saud, have stricter traditions.

Enforcement of the Kingdom's strict moral code, including hijab and separation of the sexes, is often handled by the mutaween (also Hai'a)—a special committee of Saudi men sometimes called "religious police." Mutaween have some law enforcement powers. For example, mutaween have the power to detain Saudi citizens or resident foreigners for doing anything deemed immoral. While the anti-vice committee is active across the Kingdom, it is particularly active in Riyadh, Buraydah and Tabuk.

=== History ===
Until the Islamic revivalism, which occurred in Saudi Arabia after the Grand Mosque seizure in 1979, there were no legal requirement for women's veiling or seclusion in harem sex segregation. In the King Faisal era (1964–1975), women's access to education, work and public visibility expanded, and in the 1970s, some Saudi women did not veil in public.

The 1979 Iranian Revolution and subsequent Grand Mosque Seizure in Saudi Arabia caused the government to implement stricter enforcement of Sharia. Saudi women who were adults before 1979 recall driving, inviting unrelated men into their homes (with the door open), and being in public without an abaya or niqab. 1979 was also a pivotal year for the emergence of women's roles in Saudi music, art, and culture. The subsequent September 11th attacks against the World Trade Center in 2001, on the other hand, are often viewed as precipitating cultural change away from strict fundamentalism.

The government under King Abdullah was considered reformist. It opened the country's first co-educational university, appointed the first female cabinet member, and passed laws against domestic violence. Women did not gain the right to vote until 2005, but the king supported women's right to drive and vote. Critics say the reforms were far too slow and often more symbolic than substantive.

=== Public opinion ===
According to The Economist, a 2006 Saudi government poll found that 89% of Saudi women did not think women should drive, and 86% did not think women should work with men. However, this was directly contradicted by a 2007 Gallup poll, which found that 66% of Saudi women and 55% of Saudi men agreed that women should be allowed to drive. Moreover, that same poll found that more than 8 in 10 Saudi women (82%) and three-quarters of Saudi men (75%) agreed that women should be allowed to hold any job for which they are qualified.

Five hundred Saudi women attended a 2006 lecture in Riyadh that opposed loosening traditional gender roles and restrictions. Mashael al-Eissa, a writer, opposed reforms. She argued that Saudi Arabia is the closest thing to an ideal and pure Islamic nation, and that it is under threat from "imported Western values."

In 2013, former lecturer Ahmed Abdel-Raheem polled female students at Al-Lith College for Girls at Umm al-Qura University in Mecca and found that 79% of the participants opposed lifting the driving ban for women. One of the students who took part in the poll commented, "In my point of view, female driving is not a necessity because in the country of the two holy mosques every woman is like a queen. There is [someone] who cares about her; and a woman needs nothing as long as there is a man who loves her and meets her needs; as for the current campaigns calling for women's driving, they are not reasonable. Female driving is a matter of fun and amusement, let us be reasonable and thank God so much for the welfare we live in."

Abdel-Raheem conducted another poll of 8,402 Saudi women, which found that 90% of women supported the male guardianship system. Another poll conducted by Saudi students found that 86% of Saudi women do not want the driving ban to be lifted. A Gallup poll in 2006, conducted in eight predominantly Muslim countries, found that only in Saudi Arabia did the majority of women disagree that women should be allowed to hold political office.

Some Saudi women, including educated ones, who have been supportive of traditional gender roles, have insisted that loosening the bans on women driving and working with men is part of an onslaught of Westernized ideas meant to weaken Islam. Many have also taken the position that Saudi Arabia is uniquely in need of conservative values because it is the center of Islam. Some Saudi female advocates of government reform reject foreign criticism of Saudi limitations upon rights for "failing to understand the uniqueness of Saudi society."

Journalist Maha Akeel, a frequent critic of her government's restrictions on women, states that Western critics do not understand Saudi Arabia. "Look, we are not asking for... women's rights according to Western values or lifestyles... We want things according to what Islam says. Look at our history, our role models." According to former Arab News managing editor John R. Bradley, Western pressure for broadened rights is counterproductive, particularly pressure from the United States, given the "intense anti-American sentiment in Saudi Arabia after September 11."

=== Male guardianship ===
Under previous Saudi law, all females were required to have a male guardian (wali), typically a father, brother, husband, or uncle (mahram). In 2019, this law was partially amended to exclude women over 21 years old from the requirement of a male guardian. The new amendment also granted women rights in relation to the guardianship of minor children. Previously, girls and women were forbidden from traveling, conducting official business, or undergoing certain medical procedures without permission from their male guardians. In 2019, Saudi Arabia allowed women to travel abroad, register for divorce or marriage, and apply for official documents without the permission of a male guardian.

Male guardians have duties to, and rights over, women in many aspects of civic life. A United Nations Special Rapporteur document states:

Legal guardianship of women by a male is practiced in varying degrees and encompasses major aspects of women's lives. The system is said to emanate from social conventions, including the importance of protecting women, and from religious precepts on travel and marriage, although these requirements were arguably confined to particular situations.

The official law, if not the custom, requiring a guardian's permission for a woman to seek employment was repealed in 2008.

In 2012, the Saudi government implemented a new policy to help enforce these traveling restrictions for women. Under it, Saudi Arabian men receive a text message on their mobile phones whenever a woman under their custody leaves the country, even if she is traveling with her guardian. Saudi Arabian feminist activist Manal al-Sharif commented that "this is technology used to serve backwardness in order to keep women imprisoned."

Every year more than 1,000 women try to flee Saudi Arabia. Text alerts sent by the Saudi authorities enable many guardians to catch them before they actually escape. Bethany Vierra, a 31-year-old American woman, became the latest victim of the "male guardianship" system, as she was trapped in Saudi Arabia with her 4-year-old daughter, Zaina, despite having received a divorce from her Saudi husband.

Some examples of that further highlight the ramifications of these restrictions include:

- In 2002, a fire at a girls' school in Mecca killed fifteen girls. Complaints were made that Saudi Arabia's "religious police," specifically the Committee for the Promotion of Virtue and the Prevention of Vice, prevented them from leaving the burning building and hindered rescue workers because the students were not wearing modest clothing and, possibly, because they lacked male escorts.
- In August 2005, a court in the northern part of Saudi Arabia ordered the divorce of Fatima Mansour, a 34-year-old mother of two, from her husband, even though they were happily married and her father (deceased) had approved the marriage. The divorce was initiated by her half-brother using his powers as her male guardian. He alleged that his half-sister's husband was from a tribe of a low status compared to the status of her tribe, and that the husband had failed to disclose this when he first asked for Fatima's hand. If sent back to her brother's home, Fatima feared domestic violence. She spent four years in jail with her daughter before the Supreme Judicial Council overturned the decision.
- In 2008, a wali married off his eight-year-old daughter to a 47-year-old man in order to have his debts forgiven. The man's wife sought an annulment to the eight-year-old girl's marriage, but the Saudi judge refused to grant it.
- In a 2009 case, a father vetoed several of his daughter's attempts to marry outside their tribe, and sent her to a mental institution as punishment.
- In July 2013, doctors at King Fahd Hospital in Al Bahah postponed amputating a critically injured woman's hand because she had no male legal guardian to authorize the procedure. Her husband had died in the same car crash that injured her and her daughter.
- In 2017, Manal al-Sharif reported meeting a woman in prison who had finished serving her criminal sentence, but because her male guardian refused to sign her release papers, she was being held indefinitely.

Guardianship requirements are not written law, but instead are applied according to the customs and understanding of particular officials and institutions (hospitals, police stations, banks, etc.). When women initiate official transactions and grievances, the transactions are often abandoned because officers, or the women themselves, believe they need guardian authorization. Officials may demand the presence of a guardian if a woman cannot show an ID card, or if she is fully covered. These conditions make complaints against the guardians themselves extremely difficult.

In 2008, Rowdha Yousef and other Saudi women launched a petition, "My Guardian Knows What's Best for Me," which gathered over 5,000 signatures. The petition defended the status quo and requested punishment for activists who demand "equality between men and women, [and] mingling between men and women in mixed environments."

In 2016, Saudis filed the first petition to end male guardianship, signed by over 14,500 people. Women's rights supporter Aziza Al-Yousef delivered it in person to the Saudi royal court.

Liberal activists reject guardianship and find it demeaning to women. They object to being treated like "subordinates" and "children". They point to women whose guardians ended their careers, and those who lost their children because they lacked custody rights. The courts recognize obedience to the father as law, even in cases involving adult daughters. Saudi activist Wajeha al-Huwaider agrees that most Saudi men are caring, but "it's the same kind of feeling they have for handicapped people or for animals. The kindness comes from pity, from lack of respect." She compares male guardianship to slavery:

The ownership of a woman is passed from one man to another. Ownership of the woman is passed from the father or the brother to another man, the husband. The woman is merely a piece of merchandise, which is passed over to someone else—her guardian. Ultimately, I think women are greatly feared. When I compare the Saudi man with other Arab men, I can say that the Saudi is the only man who could not compete with the woman. He could not compete, so what did he do with her? The woman has capabilities. When women study, they compete with the men for jobs. All jobs are open to men. 90% of them are open to men. You do not feel any competition. If you do not face competition from the Saudi woman, you have the entire scene for yourself. All positions and jobs are reserved for you. Therefore, you are a spoiled and self-indulged man.

The absurdity of the guardianship system, according to Huwaider, is shown by what would happen if she tried to remarry: "I would have to get the permission of my son."

The Saudi government has approved international and domestic declarations regarding women's rights, and insists that there is no law of male guardianship. Officially, it maintains that international agreements are applied in the courts. International organizations and NGOs, on the other hand, are skeptical: "The Saudi government is saying one thing to the United Nations Human Rights Council in Geneva but doing another thing inside the Kingdom," said Sarah Leah Whitson, Middle East director at Human Rights Watch. Saudi interlocutors told a UN investigator that international agreements carry little to no weight in Saudi courts.

In 2017, when the Kingdom was elected to the UN women's rights commission, several human rights organizations disapproved of the decision. UN Watch director Hillel Neuer called the decision "absurd" and compared it to "making an arsonist into the town fire chief". Swedish foreign minister Margot Wallström said that Saudi Arabia "ought to be [there] to learn something about women".

In May 2017, the King passed an order allowing women to obtain government services such as education and health care without the permission of a guardian.

In 2019, Saudi Arabia adopted new measures allowing women to travel abroad without needing permission. In August 2019, a royal decree was published in the Saudi official gazette Umm al-Qura that would allow Saudi women over 21 to travel abroad without permission from a male guardian. Several other liberalizing measures were also included in the decree; however, it is unclear whether these measures have officially come into force.

In April 2020, HRW reported that a number of Saudi women using pseudonyms on Twitter had stated demands for the abolition of the male guardianship system and sexual harassment. The rights organization quoted the women as stating that any attempt to flee abuse was not possible. Women fleeing abuse can still be arrested and forcibly returned to family members.

On 16 August 2022, a female Saudi Arabian university student was sentenced to 34 years in prison for following and retweeting dissident and activists on Twitter.

On 31 August 2022, a viral online footage from an orphanage in Khamis Mushait showed Saudi security forces, including some wearing civilian clothes, chasing and attacking women with tasers, belts, and sticks. The footage sparked a national and global outcry, prompting the Saudi Public Prosecution to open an investigation into the incident. Research by the European Saudi Organisation for Human Rights has found that protests at similar facilities have led to harsh prison sentences for those involved.

==== Absher app ====
The Saudi government's smartphone application Absher allows men to control whether women under their guardianship travel outside the kingdom. It also sends alerts to the man if a woman under his guardianship uses her passport at the border. In 2019, Absher came under global criticism. Many international communities and human rights organizations demanded its removal from Google and Apple web stores. Some critics include US Rep. Katherine Clark and Rep. Carolyn Maloney, who called the app a "patriarchal weapon". US Senator Ron Wyden demanded the app's immediate removal. He called the Kingdom's control over women "abhorrent." Apple and Google agreed to investigate the app. However, following a thorough investigation, Google refused to remove the app from its web store, citing that the app does not violate the company's terms and conditions. Amnesty International and Human Rights Watch accused Apple and Google of helping "enforce gender apartheid" by hosting the app.

Some Saudi women say that the Absher app has made their lives easier as everything can be processed online, allowing, for instance, travel approval from a guardian in another city. Human rights critics see the app as a way of normalizing patriarchal control and tracking women's movements.

=== Namus ===
Male guardianship is closely related to namus (or sharaf in a Bedouin context), roughly translated as "honor." It also carries connotations of modesty and respectability. The namus of a male includes the protection of the females in his family. He provides for them, and in turn, the women's honor (sometimes called ird) reflects on him. Namus is a common feature of many different patriarchal societies.

Since the namus of a male guardian is affected by that of the women under his care, he is expected to control their behavior. If their honor is lost, especially in the eyes of the community, he has lost control of them. Threats to chastity, in particular, are threats to the namus of the male guardian. Namus can be associated with honor killing.

In 2007, a young woman was murdered by her father for chatting with a man on Facebook. The case attracted widespread media attention. Conservatives called for the government to ban Facebook, on the basis that it incites lust and encourages gender mingling.

=== Hijab and dress code ===
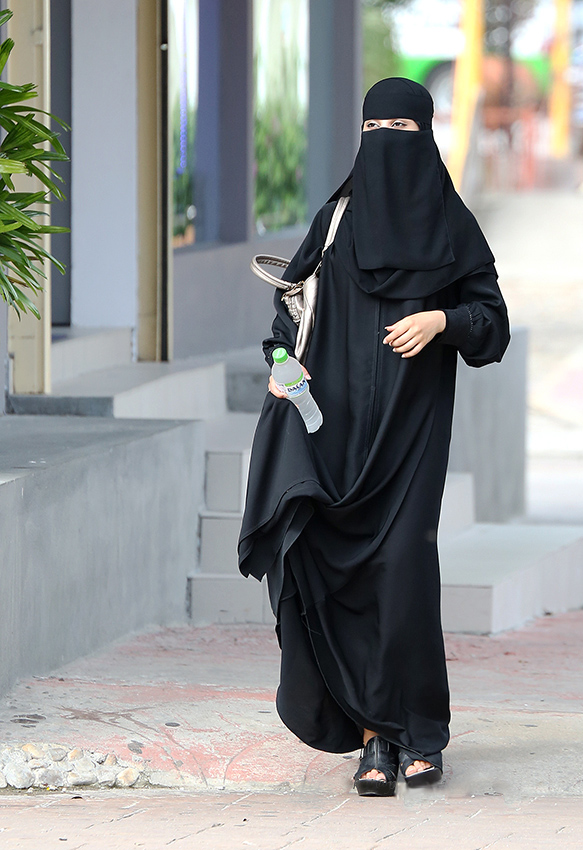
A woman wearing a niqāb in Riyadh

The hijab arises from the traditional Islamic norm whereby women are expected "to draw their outer garments around them (when they go out or are among men)" and dress in a modest manner. Previously, the Committee for the Promotion of Virtue and the Prevention of Vice, sometimes known as the religious police, has been known to patrol public places with volunteers focused on enforcing strict rules of hijab. With the 2016 reforms of Mohammed bin Salman, the power of the CPVPV was drastically reduced, and it was banned "from pursuing, questioning, asking for identification, arresting and detaining anyone suspected of a crime."

Among non-mahram men, women must cover the parts of the body that are considered intimate parts (awrah). In much of Islam, a woman's face is not considered awrah; however, in Saudi Arabia, and some other Arab states, all of the body is considered awrah except for the hands and eyes. Accordingly, most women are expected to wear the head-covering called the hijab, a full black cloak called an abaya, and a face-veil called niqab. Many historians and Islamic scholars hold that the custom, if not requirement, of the veil predates Islam in parts of the region. They argue that the Quran was interpreted to require the veil as part of adapting it to tribal traditions. Historically, the awrah for a slave woman during the era of slavery in the Muslim world, who per Islamic law was a non-Muslim, was different than that of the awrah of a free Muslim woman. The awrah of a female slave was defined as being between her navel and her knee, and consequently she did not have to wear a hijab.

The strictness of the dress code varies by region. In Jeddah, for example, many women go out with their faces and hair uncovered. Riyadh is more conservative by comparison. Some shops sell designer abayat that have elements such as flared sleeves or a tighter form. Fashionable abayat come in colors other than black and may be decorated with patterns and glitter. According to one designer, abayat are "no longer just abayas. Today, they reflect a woman's taste and personality."

Although the dress code is often regarded in the West as a highly visible symbol of oppression, Saudi women place the dress code low on the list of priorities for reform, and some leave it off entirely. Journalist Sabria Jawhar complains in The Huffington Post that Western readers of her blog are obsessed with her veil. She calls the niqab "trivial":

[People] lose sight of the bigger issues like jobs and education. That's the issue of women's rights, not the meaningless things like passing legislation in France or Quebec to ban the burqa ... Non-Saudis presume to know what's best for Saudis, like Saudis should modernize and join the 21st century or that Saudi women need to be free of the veil and abaya ... And by freeing Saudi women, the West really means they want us to be just like them, running around in short skirts, nightclubbing and abandoning our religion and culture.

Some women say they want to wear a veil. They cite Islamic piety, pride in family traditions, and less sexual harassment from male colleagues. For many women, the dress code is a part of the right to modesty that Islam guarantees women. Some also perceive attempts at reform as anti-Islamic intrusion by Westerners. Faiza al-Obaidi, a Saudi biology professor, said: "They fear Islam, and we are the world's foremost Islamic nation."

It is alleged that multiple schoolgirls burned to death in the 2002 Mecca girls' school fire because religious policemen, who saw that they were not veiled, prohibited them from fleeing. However, these charges were denied, and the inquiries into the incident initiated changes based on the conclusion that negligence of normal safety measures was the cause of these deaths.

In 2014, a female anchor became the first to appear on Saudi state television without a headscarf. She was reporting as a news anchor from London for the Al Ekhbariya channel.

In 2017, a woman was arrested for appearing in a viral video dressed in a short skirt and halter top while walking around an ancient fort in Ushayqir. She was released following international outcry. A few months earlier, a Saudi woman was detained for a short while after she appeared in public without a hijab. Although she did not wear a crop top or short skirt like the previous case, she was still arrested.

As of late 2019, hijab and abaya are no longer required for women in public.

== Mobility ==
In 2019, following suggestions made in 2017, Saudi women were given the ability to travel abroad freely without permission from male guardians. As of August 2019, women over 21 can travel abroad without male permission.

Many of the laws controlling women also apply to citizens of other countries who are relatives of Saudi men. For example, the following groups require a male guardian's permission to leave the country: foreign women married to Saudi men, adult foreign women who are the unmarried daughters of Saudi fathers, and foreign boys under the age of 21 with a Saudi father.

In 2013, Saudi women were allowed to ride bicycles for the first time, although only in parks and other "recreational areas." Female cyclists must be dressed in full body coverings and be accompanied by a male relative. A 2012 film named Wadjda highlighted this issue.

=== Driving ===
Until June 2018, women were not allowed to drive in Saudi Arabia. Saudi Arabia was the only country in the world at the time with such a restriction. On 26 September 2017 King Salman decreed that women would be allowed to obtain driver's licenses in the Kingdom, which would effectively grant women the right to drive, within the next year. Salman's decision was backed by a majority of the Council of Senior Religious Scholars. Salman's orders gave responsible departments 30 days to prepare reports for implementation, with the goal of removing the ban on women's driver's licenses by June 2018. Newspaper editorials in support of the decree claimed that women were allowed to ride camels in the time of Muhammad. The ban was lifted on 24 June 2018, and more than 120,000 women applied for driver's licenses that day.

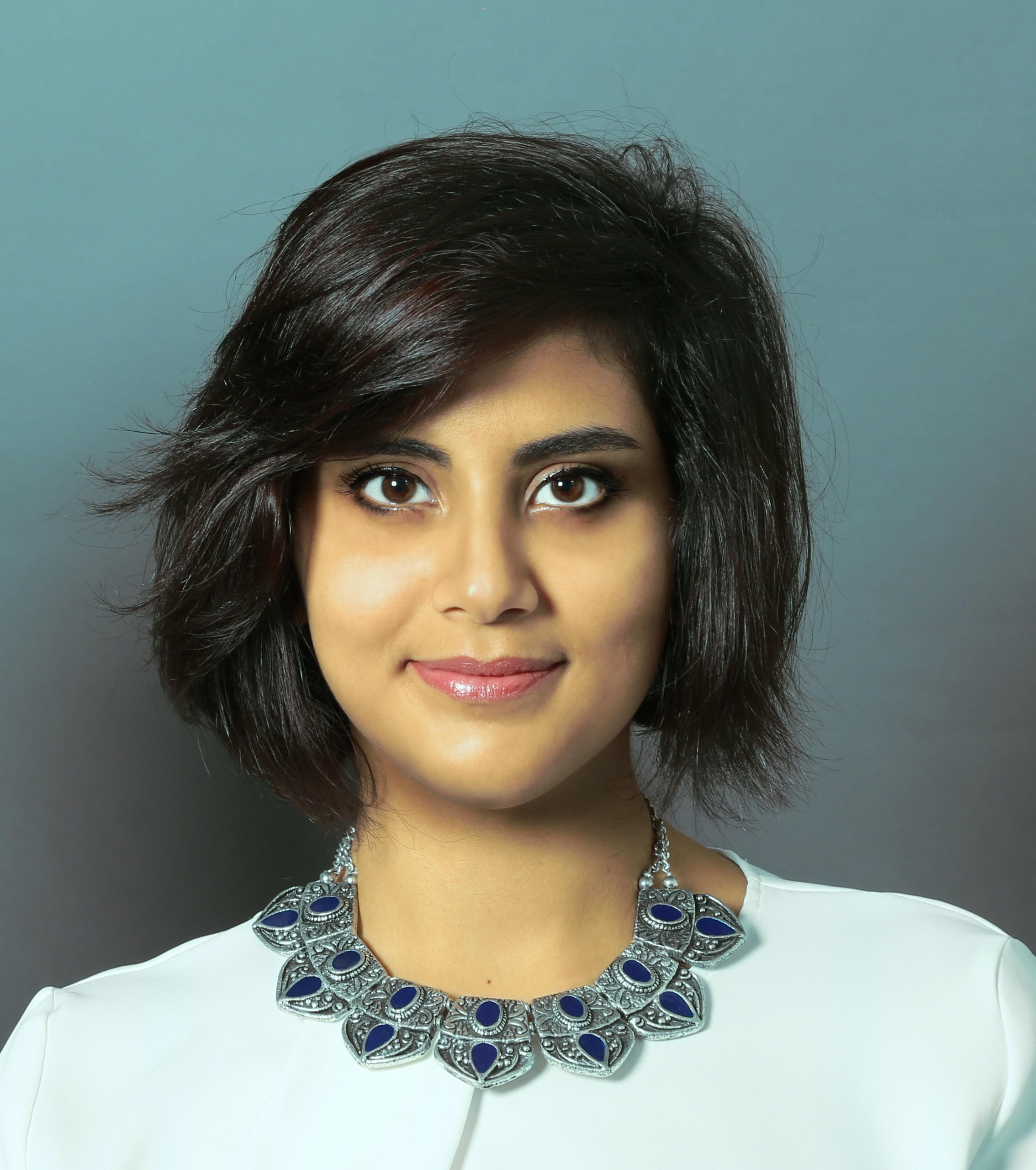
Loujain al-Hathloul was arrested by Saudi Arabian police after driving across the Saudi–UAE border.

The UN Human Rights Office said, "The decision to allow women in Saudi Arabia to drive is a first major step towards women's autonomy and independence, but much remains to be done to deliver gender equality in the Kingdom." Human rights expert Philip Alston and the UN Working Group on discrimination of women encouraged the Saudi regime to demonstrate further reform by repealing other discriminatory laws.

Saudi Arabia technically had no written ban on women driving prior to 2018, but Saudi law requires citizens to use a locally issued licenses while in the country. Such licenses had not been issued to women, making it effectively illegal for women to drive. Until 2017, most Saudi scholars and religious authorities declared women driving haram (forbidden). Commonly given reasons for the prohibition on women driving included:

1. Driving a car may lead women to interact with non-mahram males; for example, in the event of traffic accidents.
2. Driving would be the first step in an erosion of traditional values, for example gender segregation.

During the ban on female drivers, many women in rural areas still drove. According to one Saudi native, rural women drove "because their families' survival depends on it," and because the mutaween "can't effectively patrol" remote areas. However, in 2010, mutaween were clamping down on this freedom.

Critics of the ban argued that it violated gender segregation customs by needlessly forcing women to take taxis with male drivers, or ride with male chauffeurs. It also placed an inordinate financial burden on families, causing the average woman to spend half her income on taxis. Further, it impeded the education and employment of women, because students and workers generally need to commute. Male drivers have also been a frequent cause of complaints of sexual harassment. Finally, the public transport system is widely regarded as unreliable and dangerous.

On 6 November 1990, 47 Saudi women who had valid licenses issued by other countries drove through the streets of Riyadh to protest the ban on Saudi women drivers. The women were eventually surrounded by curious onlookers, then stopped by traffic police, who took them into custody. They were released after their male guardians signed statements that they would not drive again, but thousands of leaflets with their names and their husbands' names – with the words "whores" and "pimps" scrawled next to them – circulated around the city. These women were suspended from jobs, had their passports confiscated, and were told not to speak to the press. About a year after the protest, they returned to work and recovered their passports, but they were kept under surveillance and passed over for promotions.

External videos
- Q&A interview with al-Sharif on her book Daring to Drive: A Saudi Woman's Awakening, 16 July 2017, C-SPAN

In 2008, women to drive advocates in Saudi Arabia collected about 1,000 signatures, hoping to persuade King Abdullah to lift the ban, but they were unsuccessful. He said that he thought women would drive when the society was ready for it:

I believe strongly in the rights of women. My mother is a woman. My sister is a woman. My daughter is a woman. My wife is a woman. I believe the day will come when women will drive. In fact if you look at the areas of Saudi Arabia, the desert, and in the rural areas, you will find that women do drive. The issue will require patience. In time I believe that it will be possible. I believe that patience is a virtue.

On International Women's Day 2008, the Saudi feminist activist Wajeha al-Huwaider posted a YouTube video of herself driving in a rural area, where female drivers were tolerated, and requesting a universal right for women to drive. She commented: "I would like to congratulate every group of women that has been successful in gaining rights. And I hope that every woman that remains fighting for her rights receives them soon." Another women's driving campaign started during the 2011 Saudi Arabian protests when Al-Huwaider filmed Manal al-Sharif driving in Khobar and published the video on YouTube and Facebook.

Many skeptics believed that allowing women the right to drive could lead to Western-style openness and an erosion of traditional values.

In September 2011, a woman from Jeddah was sentenced to ten lashes by whip for driving a car. In contrast to this punishment, Maha al-Qahtani, the first woman in Saudi Arabia to receive a traffic ticket, was only fined for the violation itself. The whipping was the first time a woman was punished under the law for driving. Previously, when women were found driving they would normally be questioned and let go after they signed a pledge not to drive again. The whipping sentence followed months of protests by female activists, and just two days after, King Abdullah announced greater political participation for women in the future. King Abdullah overturned the woman's sentence.

In 2014, another prominent activist, Loujain Al Hathloul, was arrested by Saudi police after crossing the UAE–Saudi border in her car. Although she had a valid UAE license, she was still detained. After being badly treated and facing more than a year's delay in the start of her legal process, she, along with other women's rights activists, attended a hearing with the Saudi court on 12 February 2020. Al-Hathloul was also reportedly tortured by the prison authorities while in solitary confinement. By May 15, 2020, al-Hathloul had been detained for two years. Her trial date was pushed back ‘indefinitely’ due to the COVID-19 pandemic, and her family has also been barred from seeing her amid the outbreak.

In August 2020 al-Hathloul went on a hunger strike for six days, demanding that her parents be allowed to see her at the Al-Ha'ir prison. In October of that same year she started a second hunger strike, demanding the right to contact her family members. She was released in February 2021. However, al-Hathloul is barred from leaving the country.

=== Public and private transportation ===
Women have limited access to bus and train services. Where they have such access, they must use separate entrances and sit in back sections reserved for women. In early 2010, the government considered a proposal to create a nationwide women-only bus system. Activists are divided on the proposal. Some say it will reduce sexual harassment and transportation expenses while helping to facilitate women entering the workforce. Others criticize it as an escape from the real issue of recognizing women's right to drive.

The Dubai-based carsharing app service Careem started business in Saudi Arabia in 2013, and Uber arrived in 2014. Women account for 80% of their passengers. The Saudi government has also supported these initiatives as a means of reducing unemployment and, in its Saudi Vision 2030 initiative, has invested equity in both companies. Vehicle for Hire has improved mobility for women, and also promoted employment participation with its improved transport flexibility.

To support working women, the Saudi government has launched the Wusool program, which provides transportation services to them.

== Legal issues ==
=== Political life ===
Saudi Arabia is an absolute monarchy with a Consultative Assembly of lawmakers appointed by the king. Prior to a September 2011 announcement by King Abdullah, only men 30 years of age and older could serve as lawmakers. As of 2011, women can be appointed to the Consultative Assembly. Women first joined the Consultative Assembly in January 2013, occupying thirty seats.

In 2013, three women were named as deputy chairpersons of three committees: Thoraya Obaid was named deputy chairwoman of the Human Rights and Petitions Committee, Zainab Abu Talib was named deputy chairwoman of the Information and Cultural Committee, and Lubna Al-Ansari was named deputy chairwoman of the Health Affairs and Environment Committee. Another major appointment occurred in April 2012, when Muneera bint Hamdan Al Osaimi was appointed assistant undersecretary in the medical services affairs department at the Ministry of Health.

Women could neither vote nor run for office in the country's first municipal elections in 2005, or in the 2011 election cycle. They campaigned for the right to vote in the 2011 municipal elections, attempting unsuccessfully to register as voters. In September 2011, King Abdullah announced that women would be allowed to vote and run for office in the 2015 municipal elections. Although King Abdullah was no longer alive at the time of the 2015 municipal elections, women were allowed to vote and stand as candidates for the first time in the country's history. Salma bint Hizab al-Oteibi was the first female elected official in the country. According to unofficial results released to The Associated Press, a total of 20 female candidates were elected to the approximately 2,100 municipal council seats being contested, which made them the first women elected to municipal councils in the country's history.

Women are allowed to hold position on boards of chambers of commerce. In 2008, two women were elected to the board of the Jeddah Chamber of Commerce and Industry. There are no women on the High Court or the Supreme Judicial Council. There is one woman in a cabinet-level position as deputy minister for women's education; she was appointed in February 2009. In 2010, the government announced female lawyers would be allowed to represent women in family cases. In 2013, Saudi Arabia registered its first female trainee lawyer, Arwa al-Hujaili.

In court, the testimony of one man equals that of two women. In court proceedings, women generally must deputize male relatives to speak on their behalf.

In February 2019, Princess Reema bint Bandar Al Saud was appointed as the Saudi ambassador to the US. She became the first female envoy in the history of the Kingdom. As of 2021, there are three female diplomats who are serving as Saudi ambassadors.

=== Identity cards ===
At age 15, male Saudis receive identity cards that they are required to carry at all times. Before the 21st century, women were not issued cards, but instead were named as dependents on their mahram's (usually their father's or husband's) ID card, so that, "strictly speaking," they were not allowed in public without their mahram.

At the time, it was difficult for women to prove their identity in court. In addition to lacking ID cards, women could not own passports or driver's licenses. Instead, they had to produce two male relations to confirm their identity. If a man denied that the woman in court was his relative, "the man's word would normally be taken," wrote author Harvey North. This system made women vulnerable to false claims on their property and to violations of inheritance rights.

The Ulema, Saudi's religious authorities, opposed the idea of issuing separate identity cards for women since non-mahrams would see women's faces. Many other conservative Saudi citizens argue that cards, which must show a woman's unveiled face, violate purdah and Saudi custom. However, women were eventually issued ID cards.

In 2001, a small number of ID cards were issued for women who had the permission of their mahram. By 2006, women no longer needed male permission to obtain an ID card, and by 2013, ID cards became compulsory for women.

In 2008, women were allowed to enter hotels and furnished apartments without their mahram if they had their national identification cards. In April 2010, a new, optional ID card for women was issued which allows them to travel in countries of the Gulf Cooperation Council. Women did not need male permission to apply for the card, but in 2010, they still needed male permission to travel abroad. As of 2019, Saudi women over 21 no longer need male permission to travel.

=== Family code ===
==== Marriage ====
In 2005, the country's religious authority officially banned the practice of forced marriage. Despite this, Saudi Arabia maintained that a marriage contract is officially between the husband-to-be and the father of the bride-to-be. As of 2005, the bride's consent is needed in a marriage. No Saudi citizen can marry a non-Saudi citizen without official permission. In 2016, justice minister Walid al-Samaani announced that clerics who register marriage contracts would have to provide a copy to the bride "to ensure her awareness of her rights and the terms of the contract."

Polygyny is legal in Saudi Arabia, though it is on the decline due to demographic and economic reasons. Polyandry is forbidden.

Historically, during the era of slavery in Saudi Arabia, Muslim men could legally have slave concubines in addition to their four wives. Since concubines in Islam were legally slaves, the legal possibility for a man to have concubines was abolished when slavery in Saudi Arabia was abolished in 1962. There was however a possibility that concubinage continued for a time after abolition. In the 1960s, the Anti-Slavery International and the Friends World Committee informed the UN that there were still slave trade to Saudi Arabia despite the abolition of slavery in Saudi Arabia in 1962, and asked if any countries would be helped to find their own nationals in Saudi harems who might want to return home; this was a very sensitive issue, since there was an awareness that many women were enslaved as concubines in the harems, and that there were no information as to whether the abolition of slavery had affected them.

The Kingdom prevents Saudi women from marrying male expatriates who test positive for drugs (including alcohol), incurable STDs, or genetic diseases, but does not stop Saudi men from marrying female expatriates with such problems.

==== Domestic violence ====
In 2004, a popular television presenter, Rania al-Baz, was severely beaten by her husband. Photographs of her "bruised and swollen face" were published in the press. Her case brought light to domestic violence in Saudi Arabia. According to Al-Baz, her husband beat her after she answered the phone without his permission, and he said he intended to kill her.

State data, published in 2012, estimated that between 16 and 50% of married Saudi women suffer intimate partner violence. Domestic violence against women and children was not seen as a crime in Saudi Arabia until 2013. In 2008, the Prime Minister ordered that "social protection units," the Kingdom's version of women's shelters, be expanded. That year, the Prime Minister also ordered the government to draft a national strategy to deal with domestic violence. Some Saudi royal foundations, such as the King Abdulaziz Center for National Dialogue and the King Khalid Foundation, have also led education and awareness efforts against domestic violence. Five years later, Saudi Arabia launched its first major effort against domestic violence: the "No More Abuse" ad campaign.

In August 2013, following a Twitter campaign, the Saudi cabinet approved a law that made domestic violence a criminal offense for the first time. The law calls for a punishment of up to a year in prison and a fine of up to 50,000 riyals (US$13,000), with doubled maximum punishments for repeat offenders. The law criminalizes psychological and sexual abuse, as well as physical abuse. It also includes a provision obliging employees to report instances of abuse in the workplace to their employer. Saudi women's rights activist Suad Abu Dayyeh welcomed the new laws, although she believed law enforcement would need training on domestic abuse. She also said that, given the tradition of male guardianship, the law would be difficult to enforce.

==== Children ====
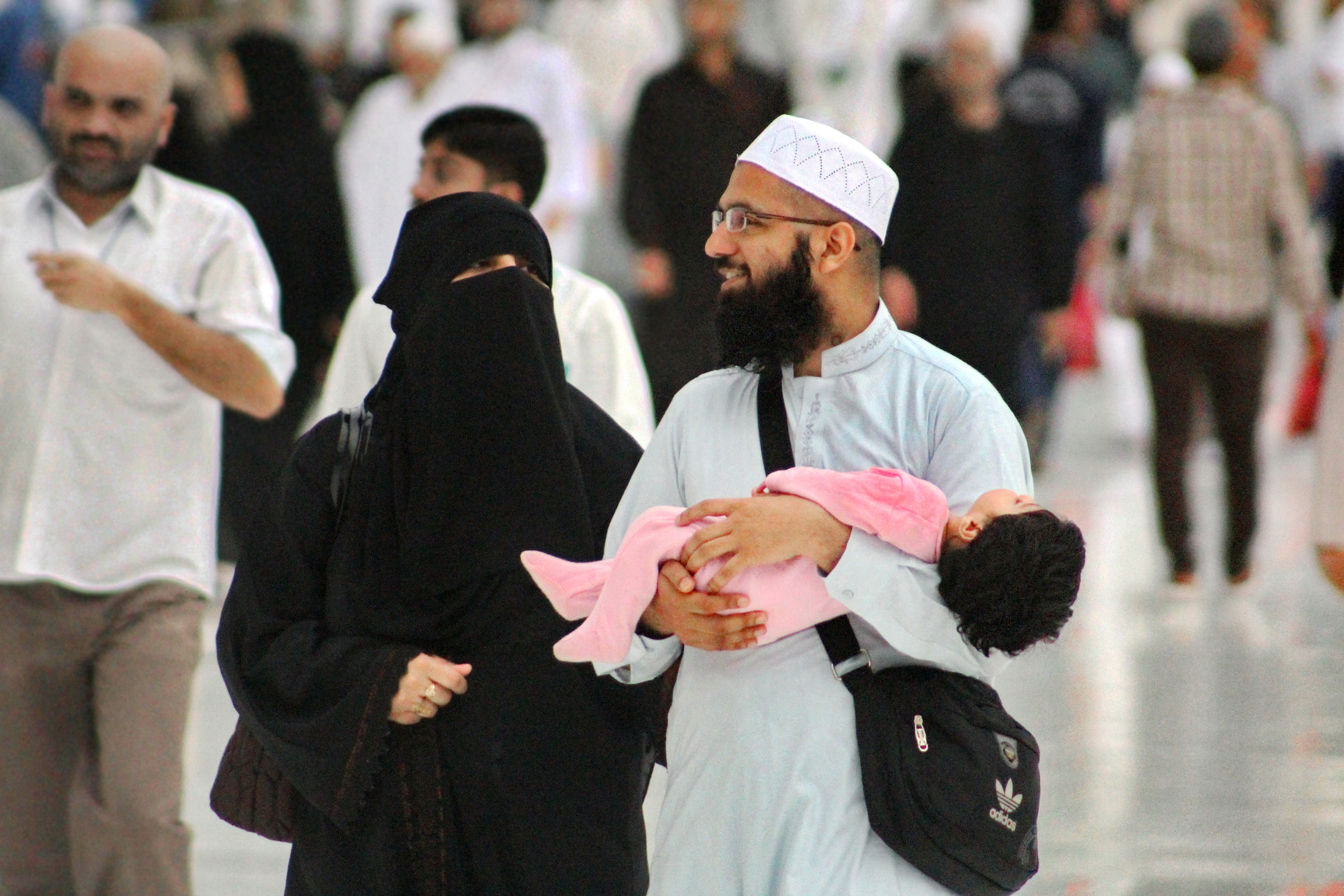
A young couple and their toddler in Mecca

In 2019, Saudi Arabia officially banned child marriages and set the minimum age for marriage as 18 years for both women and men. In 2013, the average age at first marriage for Saudi women was 25.

Senior clergy originally opposed the push to ban child marriage. They argued that a girl reaches adulthood at puberty. Most Saudi religious authorities have defended the marriage of girls as young as nine and boys as young as fifteen. However, they also believe that a father can marry off his prepubescent daughter so long as consummation is delayed until puberty. A 2009 think-tank report on women's education concluded "Early marriage (before 16 years)... negatively influences a woman's chance of employment and the economic status of the family. It also negatively affects her health as they are at greater risk of dying from causes related to pregnancy and childbirth." A 2004 United Nations report found that 16% of Saudi female teens were or had been married.

The government's Saudi Human Rights Commission condemned child marriage in 2009, calling it "a clear violation against children and their psychological, moral and physical rights." It recommended that marriage officials adhere to a minimum age of 17 for females and 18 for males. A 2010 news report documented the case of Shareefa, an abandoned child-bride. Shareefa was married to an 80-year-old man when she was 10. The deal was arranged by the girl's father in exchange for money, and against the wishes of her mother. Her husband divorced her a few months after the marriage without her knowledge and abandoned her at the age of 21. The mother then attempted legal action, arguing that "Shareefa is now 21, she has lost more than 10 years of her life, her chance for an education, a decent marriage and normal life. Who is going to take responsibility for what she has gone through?"

In 2013, the Directorate General of Passports allowed Saudi women married to foreigners to sponsor their children so that the children can have residency permits (iqamas) with their mothers named as the sponsors. Iqamas also grant children the right to work in the private sector in Saudi Arabia while on the sponsorship of their mothers. They also allow mothers to bring their children living abroad back to Saudi Arabia if they have no criminal records. Foreign men married to Saudi women were also granted the right to work in the private sector while on the sponsorship of their wives on condition that the title on their iqamas should be written as "husband of a Saudi wife," and that they should have valid passports enabling them to return to their homes at any time.

==== Parental authority ====
Legally, children belong to their father, who has sole guardianship. If a divorce takes place, women may be granted custody of their young children until they reach the age of seven (for girls) and nine (for boys), although sometimes women gain custody of older children. Older children are often awarded to the father or the paternal grandparents. Saudi women cannot confer citizenship to children born to a foreign father.

==== Inheritance issues ====
The Quran states that daughters inherit half as much as sons.^{[Quran 4:11]} In some rural areas, some women may not receive inheritance, as they are considered to be dependents of their fathers or husbands. Marrying outside the tribe is also grounds for limiting women's inheritance in rural areas.

=== Sexual violence and trafficking ===
Under Sharia law, rape is punishable with any sentence from jail to execution. As there is no penal code in Saudi Arabia, there is no written law which specifically criminalizes rape or prescribes its punishment. The rape victim is often punished as well if she had first entered the rapist's company in violation of purdah. There is no prohibition against spousal or statutory rape. According to Human Rights Watch's World Report 2025, a woman who refuses to have sexual relations with her husband might lose her right to marital maintenance, including being provided with basic needs such as clothing and housing. In April 2020, the Saudi Supreme Court abolished the flogging punishment from its court system, replacing it with jail time, fines, or both.

Migrant women, often working as domestic helpers, represent a particularly vulnerable group. Their living conditions are sometimes slave-like; they may experience physical violence and rape. In 2006, U.S. ambassador John Miller, Director of the Office to Monitor and Combat Trafficking in Persons, said the forced labor of foreign female domestic workers was the most common kind of slavery in Saudi Arabia. Miller claimed human trafficking is a problem everywhere, but the number of foreign domestic workers in Saudi Arabia, coupled with loopholes in the system, cause many foreign workers to fall victim to abuse and torture.

Women, like men, may be subject to harassment by the country's religious police, the mutaween, in some cases including arbitrary arrest and detention, and physical punishments. A UN report cites a case in which two mutaween were charged with molesting a woman; the charges were dismissed on the grounds that mutaween are immune from prosecution.

In some cases, victims of sexual assault are punished for khalwa, or being alone with an unrelated male, prior to the assault. In the 2006 Qatif rape case, an 18-year-old victim of kidnapping and gang rape was sentenced by a Saudi court to six months in prison and 90 lashes. The judge ruled she violated laws on segregation of the sexes, as she was in an unrelated man's car at the time of the attack. She was also punished for trying to influence the court through the media. The Ministry of Justice defended the sentence, saying she committed adultery and "provoked the attack" because she was "indecently dressed." Her attackers were found guilty of kidnapping and were sentenced for prison terms ranging from two to ten years along with up to a thousand lashes.

According to Human Rights Watch, one of the rapists filmed the assault with his mobile phone, but the judges refused to allow it as evidence. The victim told ABC News that her brother tried to kill her after the attack. The case attracted international attention: the United Nations criticized social attitudes and the system of male guardianship, both of which deter women from reporting crimes. The UN report argued that women are prevented from escaping abusive environments because of their lack of legal and economic independence. They are further oppressed, according to the UN, by practices surrounding divorce and child custody, the absence of laws criminalizing violence against women, and inconsistencies in the application of laws and procedures. The case prompted Egyptian-American journalist Mona Eltahawy to comment, "What kind of God would punish a woman for rape? That is a question that Muslims must ask of Saudi Arabia because unless we challenge the determinedly anti-women teachings of Islam in Saudi Arabia, that Kingdom will always get a free pass." In December 2007, King Abdullah pardoned the victim, but he did not agree that the judge had erred.

In 2009, the Saudi Gazette reported that a 23-year-old unmarried woman was sentenced to one year in prison and 100 lashes for adultery for taking a ride from a male stranger. She said she had been gang-raped, became pregnant, and tried unsuccessfully to abort the fetus. The flogging was postponed until after the delivery.

Many Saudi women's rights activists were arrested during a crackdown on May 15, 2018, and have been subjected to sexual violence and torture in prison. Currently, 13 women's rights activists are on trial, and five of them are still in detention for defending women's rights.

== Progress and change ==
Changes in the enforcement of Islamic code have influenced women's rights in Saudi Arabia. The Iranian Revolution in 1979 and the September 11 attacks in 2001 against the United States had significant influence on Saudi cultural history and women's rights.

In 1979, the revolution in Iran led to a fundamentalist resurgence in many parts of the Islamic world. Fundamentalists tried to repel Westernization, and governments defended themselves against revolution. In Saudi Arabia, fundamentalists occupied the Grand Mosque (Masjid al-Haram) and demanded a more conservative state, including "an end of education of women." The government responded with stricter interpretations and enforcement of Islamic laws. Newspapers were discouraged from publishing images of women, and the Interior Ministry discouraged women, including expatriates, from employment. Scholarships for women to study abroad were declined, and wearing the abaya in public became mandatory.

In contrast, the September 11th, 2001 attacks against the United States precipitated a reaction against ultra-conservative Islamic sentiment; fifteen of the nineteen hijackers in the September 11 attacks came from Saudi Arabia. Since then, the mutaween have become less active, and reformists have been appointed to key government posts. The government says it has withdrawn support from schools deemed extremist and moderated school textbooks.

The government under King Abdullah was regarded as moderately progressive. It opened the country's first co-educational university, appointed the first female cabinet member, and prohibited domestic violence. Gender segregation was relaxed but remained the norm. Critics described the reform as far too slow, and often more symbolic than substantive. Conservative clerics successfully rebuffed attempts to outlaw child marriage. Women were not allowed to vote in the country's first municipal elections, although Abdullah supported a woman's right to drive and vote. The few female government officials have had minimal power. Norah Al-Faiz, the first female cabinet member, could not be seen without her veil, appear on television, or talk to male colleagues except by videoconferencing. She opposes girls' school sports as premature.

The government has made international commitments to women's rights. It ratified the Convention on the Elimination of All Forms of Discrimination against Women, with the proviso that the convention could not override Islamic law. However, government officials told the United Nations that there is no contradiction with Islam, and the degree of compliance between government commitments and practice is disputed. A 2009 report by the UN questioned whether any international law ratified by the government has ever been applied inside Saudi Arabia.

Dr. Maha Almuneef said, "There are small steps now. There are giant steps coming. But most Saudis have been taught the traditional ways. You can't just change the social order all at once."

Local and international women's groups have pushed Saudi governments for reform, taking advantage of the fact that some rulers are eager to project a more progressive image to the West. The presence of powerful businesswomen in some of these groups helped to increase women's representation in Saudi Arabian government and society, although they are still rare.

Lubna Olayan, the CEO of Olayan Financing Company, is a well-known advocate for women's rights. She was the first woman to address a mixed-gender business audience in Saudi Arabia, speaking at the Jeddah Economic Forum in 2004. She used the occasion to advocate for economic equality:

My vision is of a country with a prosperous and diversified economy in which any Saudi citizen, irrespective of gender, who is serious about finding employment, can find a job in the field for which he or she is best qualified, leading to a thriving middle class and in which all Saudi citizens, residents or visitors to the country feel safe and can live in an atmosphere where mutual respect and tolerance exist among all, regardless of their social class, religion or gender.

Both Forbes and Time magazines have named Lubna Olayan one of the world's most influential women. The Grand Mufti, Abdul-Azeez ibn Abdullaah Aal ash-Sheikh, on the other hand, condemned the event, saying that "Allowing women to mix with men is the root of every evil and catastrophe... It is highly punishable. Mixing of men and women is a reason for greater decadence and adultery."

Wajeha al-Huwaider is often described as the most radical and prominent feminist activist in Saudi Arabia. In a 2008 interview, she described plans for an NGO called The Association for the Protection and Defense of Women's Rights in Saudi Arabia. She described the goals of the organization:

Among the issues that have been raised, and that are of the utmost importance, are: representation for women in Sharia courts; setting a [minimum] age for girls' marriages; allowing women to take care of their own affairs in government agencies and allowing them to enter government buildings; protecting women from domestic violence, such as physical or verbal violence, or keeping her from studies, work, or marriage, or forcing her to divorce ... We need laws to protect women from these aggressions and violations of their rights as human beings. And there is also [the need to] prevent girls' circumcision ... We truly have a great need for a Ministry of Women's Affairs to deal with women's rights, issues of motherhood and infancy, and women's health in rural areas ... This is our ultimate goal ...

In 2008, the government warned The Association for the Protection and Defense of Women's Rights in Saudi Arabia not to hold any protests.

Saudis frequently debate how to bring about change. Those who oppose activists like Wajeha al-Huwaider fear that an all-or-nothing approach to women's rights will spur a backlash against any change. Journalist Sabria Jawhar dismisses Huwaider as a show-off: "The problem with some Saudi activists is that they want to make wholesale changes that are contrary to Islam, which requires a mahram for traveling women. If one wonders why great numbers of Saudi women don't join al-Huwaider, it's because they are asked to defy Islam. Al-Huwaider's all-or-nothing position undercuts her credibility."

Retaliation against women's rights activism has some precedent. Immediately following Operation Desert Storm in 1991, Saudi women launched a campaign for their rights. Forty-seven women drove illegally through Riyadh in protest against the ban on driving. Activists presented a petition to King Fahd requesting "basic legal and social rights." Subsequently, a feminist leader was arrested and tortured. Fundamentalists demanded strict punishment of the women who had driven in protest and denounced activists as "whores." The mutaween enforced the dress code more aggressively.

Those who argue in favor of slow change include history professor Hatoon al-Fassi. Al-Fassi says recent campaigns for women's rights have opened up public discourse on topics such as child marriage and rape. "It's an exaggeration to call it a women's movement. But we are proud to say that something is going on in Saudi Arabia. We are not really free, but it is possible for women to express themselves as never before." She says that Westerners do not understand Saudi culture and how potentially traumatic change can be: "People had lived their whole lives doing one thing and believing one thing, and suddenly the King and the major clerics were saying that mixing was O.K. You can't begin to imagine the impact that the ban on mixing has on our lives and what lifting this ban would mean."

Arguments in favor of faster change and more activism include those of Somayya Jabarti, editor of Arab News. Jabarti says there are too many women with decision-making power who are like "queen bees," doing nothing to question the status quo. "People say things are changing for women because they are comparing it to before, when things were below zero. People say 'change,' but it is all relative and it is very, very limited...Change is not coming, we are taking it ... I don't think the way is paved. I think we are building it through the route taken ... Most of the time, we are walking in place."

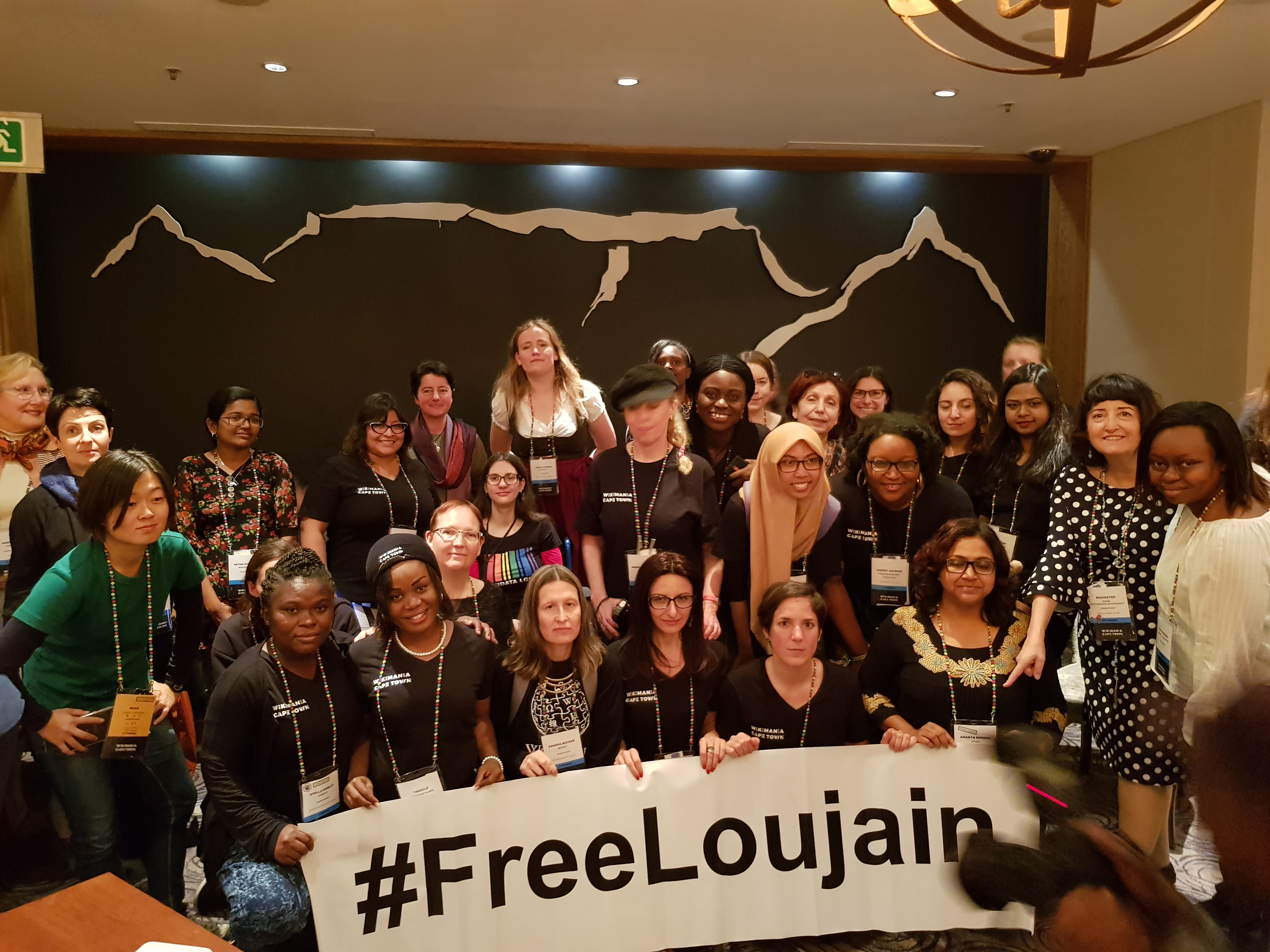
Saudi women's rights activist Loujain al-Hathloul was arrested in May 2018.

From 2009 to 2010, many Saudi women opposed mixed workplaces and women driving, and a majority of women did not think women should hold political office. Many embraced the veil and the male-guardianship system. Many Saudis viewed their country as "the closest thing to an ideal and pure Islamic nation" and, therefore, most in need of resistance to Western values. Conservative cleric Mohsen al-Awaji says the country must resist secularization: "Saudi society is a special, tribal society, and neither King Abdullah or anyone else can impose his own interpretation of Islam. They can do nothing without Islam. There is no Saudi Arabia without Islam."

Princess Loulwa Al-Faisal describes herself as a conservative, advocating for change that is gradual and consistent with Islam. As a member of the royal family, she argues that Islam sees women's rights as equal but different, which "together, add up to a secure society that works." Princess Al-Faisal argues "The ultra-conservatives and the ultra-liberals both want the same thing, the destruction of the Islamic way. We are preserving it ... There are problems mostly with the way the law is interpreted, mostly in the courts, but those are changing." According to Princess Al-Faisal, Saudi women are better off than Western women in some ways: "their property is inviolable and that men have a duty to look after them." She also says the "lack of modesty" in the West is "bad for the children." Nonetheless, she supports women's suffrage in municipal elections. When Thomas Friedman asked her what she would do if she were "queen for a day," she replied, "First thing, I'd let women drive."

For several decades, non-Saudi women suffered job discrimination because there was a popular belief that organizations and corporations were not allowed to hire non-Saudi women. Yasminah Elsaadany, a non-Saudi woman who held several managerial positions in multinational organisations in the pharmaceutical industry from 2011 to 2014, contacted the Saudi Labor Minister, Adel Fakeih, and his consultants from 2010 to 2013. She argued that this was discrimination and that it would be in the interest of Saudi industry to employ non-Saudi women to fill personnel gaps. In late 2013, the Ministry of Labor announced that it would allow non-Saudi women to work in health services, education, dressmaking, childcare, the wedding business and as cleaners.

In 2013, the Saudi government officially sanctioned sports for girls in private schools for the first time. In 2016, four Saudi women were allowed to participate in the Olympic Games in Rio de Janeiro, and Princess Reema was appointed to lead the new department for women of the sports authority.

In the 2015 Global Gender Gap Report, Saudi Arabia progressed by four places due to an increase in the percentage of women in parliament (from 0% to 20%), based on the introduction of a new quota for women in parliament, and it had the biggest overall score improvement relative to any country in the Middle East in 2006.

That same year, Saudi women were allowed to ride bicycles for the first time, although only around parks and other "recreational areas." Female cyclists must also be dressed in full Islamic body coverings and be accompanied by a male relative. Saudi Arabia also registered its first female trainee lawyer, Arwa al-Hujaili, who is also the first Saudi woman to attain an aircraft dispatcher license.

A royal decree passed in May 2017 gave women access to government services such as education and healthcare without the need for a male guardian's consent. The order also stated that such access should only be allowed if it does not contradict Sharia law.

In 2017, a decision was made that allowed women to process their government transactions without the need to obtain prior consent from their partners.

On 26 September 2017 women were legally allowed to drive, but the law was not implemented until 23 June 2018.

In May 2018, activist Loujain Al-Hathloul was arrested by the Saudi authorities for driving and advocating for women's rights. She has been kept in solitary confinement, denied access to medical care, legal advice or visits from family members. Reportedly, she has also been subjected to various forms of torture, including whipping, beating, electrocution and sexual harassment.

In January 2019, the Saudi justice ministry approved a new law that would prevent men from secretly divorcing their wives without informing them. With the new regulation, the woman would receive a text message from the court when the divorce was processed. "Women...will be notified of any changes to their marital status via text message. Women in the Kingdom will be able to view documents related to the termination of their marriage contracts through the ministry's website," the justice ministry said. Also in 2019, the number of female attorneys increased by 120 percent.

A new law that was amended in 2019 allowed women aged 21 and above to apply for a passport and to travel without a guardian approval. The amendment also permitted women to "register a marriage, divorce, or child's birth and to be issued official family documents. It also stipulates that a father or mother can be legal guardians of children." In November 2020, Saudi Arabia announced new penalties including fines and imprisonment for abusing women, either physically or psychologically.

As of 2020, reforms appear to be working across a number of metrics. A crucial one is the employment rate of women, which increased from 66 per cent in 2016 to 75 per cent in that year. These measures are significant, but their implementation is even more so in light of the COVID-19 pandemic, the consequences of which the world will live with for years to come.

In January 2021 Saudi Arabia amended anti-harassment laws to include provisions for publishing the names of the offenders. In 2022 a man was imprisoned for eight months for verbally abusing a woman, and his name published.

However, an investigation by The Guardian newspaper in 2025 found that the Dar al-Reaya, officially "care homes", continued to be effectively "jails" for women whose families wish to institutionalize them for disobedience, extramarital sexual relations or being absent from home. Some women are sent to Dar al-Reaya to protect a family's reputation after a woman is sexually abused by a brother or father. Treatment was reported to be "hellish": very harsh, with solitary confinement, flogging, and no visits or contact.

=== New technology ===
Gender segregation has produced great enthusiasm for innovative communications technology, especially when it is anonymous. Saudis were early adopters of Bluetooth technology, as men and women have used it to communicate secretly.

Saudi women use online social networking as a way to share ideas they cannot share publicly. As one woman states:

In Saudi Arabia, we live more of a virtual life than a real life. I know people who are involved in online romances with people they have never met in real life...And many of us use Facebook for other things, like talking about human rights and women's rights. We can protest on Facebook about the jailing of a blogger which is something we couldn't do on the streets.

A Saudi internet radio station that promotes women's rights from abroad announced via Twitter that it would broadcast on a weekly basis.

== Foreign views ==
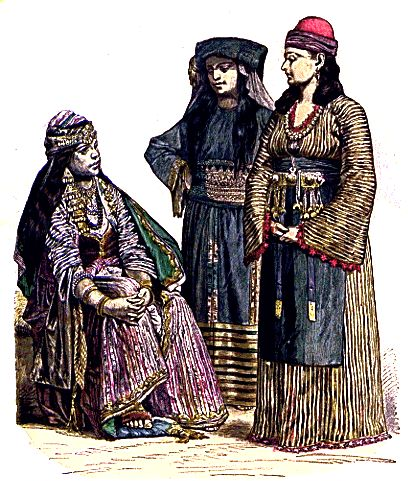
Three Muslim women in 19th-century clothing. The middle woman is from Mecca; the other two are Syrian.

Western critics often compare the treatment of Saudi women to a system of apartheid, analogous with South Africa's treatment of non-whites during South Africa's apartheid era. As evidence, they cite restrictions on travel, fields of study, choice of profession, access to the courts, and political speech. Mona Eltahawy, a columnist for The New York Times wrote, "Saudi women are denied many of the same rights that 'Blacks' and 'Coloreds' were denied in apartheid South Africa and yet the Kingdom still belongs to the very same international community that kicked Pretoria out of its club."

Some commentators have argued that Saudi gender policies constitute a crime against humanity and warrant intervention from the international community. They criticize the U.S. government for decrying the Taliban's sexist policies while allied to Saudi Arabia. Mary Kaldor views gender apartheid in Saudi Arabia as similar to that enforced by the Taliban in Afghanistan. In contrast, political commentator Daniel Pipes sees Saudi gender apartheid as tempered by other practices, such as allowing women to attend school and work.

Critics also blame Western corporations that cooperate with the enforcement of gender segregation. American chains such as Starbucks and Pizza Hut maintain separate eating areas; the men's areas are typically high-quality, whereas the women's are rundown and sometimes even lack seats. In a 2001 column, Washington Post editor Colbert I. King commented:

As with Saudi Arabia, white-ruled South Africa viewed external criticism as a violation of its sovereignty and interference with its internal affairs. And U.S. corporations in South Africa, as with their Saudi Arabian counterparts, pleaded that they had no choice but to defer to the local 'culture.'

King went on to question why there is nothing like the Sullivan Principles for gender-based discrimination. Journalist Anne Applebaum argues that gender apartheid in Saudi Arabia gets a free pass from American feminists. She questions why American civil rights leaders like Jesse Jackson were active in protesting South Africa's racial apartheid, but American feminists rarely venture beyond reproductive rights when discussing international politics: "Until this changes, it will be hard to mount a campaign, in the manner of the anti-apartheid movement, to enforce sanctions or codes of conduct for people doing business there."

Cultural relativism is the root of activist inaction according to feminists such as Azar Majedi, Pamela Bone, and Maryam Namazie. They argue that political Islam is misogynistic, and the desire of Western liberals to tolerate Islam blinds them to women's rights violations. Majedi and Namazie, both born in Iran, consider cultural relativism racist: "To put it bluntly, according to this concept, because of my birthplace, I should enjoy fewer rights relative to a woman born in Sweden, England, or France." Pamela Bone argues feminist apathy is supported by "the dreary cultural relativism that pervades the thinking of so many of those once described as on the Left. We are no better than they are. We should not impose our values on them. We can criticise only our own. The problem with this mindset is that, with all its faults, Western culture is clearly, objectively, better." Bone argues that cultural relativism comes from a fear that criticizing Islam will be considered racist.

Ann Elizabeth Mayer, an American specialist in Islamic law, sees gender apartheid as enshrined in the Saudi Basic Law:

Article 9. The family is the kernel of Saudi society, and its members shall be brought up on the basis of the Islamic faith, and loyalty and obedience to Allah, His Messenger, and to guardians; respect for and implementation of the law, and love of and pride in the homeland and its glorious history as the Islamic faith stipulates.
Article 10. The state will aspire to strengthen family ties, maintain its Arab and Islamic values and care for all its members, and to provide the right conditions for the growth of their resources and capabilities.

Mayer argues that Articles 9 and 10 deny women "any opportunity to participate in public law or government."

In January 2019, British parliamentarians and lawmakers sought access to eight detained female activists in Saudi Arabia. The request followed a report by the Human Rights Watch, which claimed that the women were subject to abuse, electric shocks, beatings, flogging, and rape threats. Crispin Blunt, UK Conservative Member of Parliament, said:

There are credible concerns that the conditions in which the Saudi women activists are being detained may have fallen significantly short of both international and Saudi Arabia's own standards. We make this request to the Saudi authorities so that we can assess for ourselves the conditions in which the Saudi women activists have been and are being detained today. No person should be subjected to the type of treatment that has allegedly been inflicted upon these women activists while in detention. The implications of activists being detained and tortured for exercising their freedom of speech and conducting peaceful campaigns is concerning for all individuals seeking to exercise their human rights in Saudi Arabia.

On 15 October 2020 UK-based rights advocacy group Amnesty International urged the participants of Women 20 Summit to demand Riyadh to release the imprisoned women's rights activists. According to Amnesty International, participants of the W20 had the opportunity and shared the responsibility to not only stand for the detained Saudi women rights defenders but also promote a meaningful human rights campaign.

On 29 November 2020 seven European human rights ambassadors criticized Saudi Arabia over the continued detention of at least five women's rights activists, including Loujain al-Hathloul. According to a statement by Loujain al-Hathloul's family, the court referred her case to the Specialized Criminal Court for terrorism and national security cases. According to Amnesty International, Samar Badawi was also referred to the same special court, while Nassima al-Sada, Nouf Abdulaziz and Maya’a al-Zahrani were to remain in detention. CNN reached out to the Saudi government for their response; the Saudi Minister of State for Foreign Affairs, Adel Jubeir, told them that Loujain's case "was up to the courts" and that she was tried for matters concerning the national security of Saudi Arabia.

== See also ==
- Abortion in Saudi Arabia
- Contemporary Saudi Arabian female artists and Saudi women in the arts
- LGBT rights in Saudi Arabia
- Sex segregation in Iran
- Taliban treatment of women
- Wahhabi movement
- Women in the Arab world
- Women in Islam
- Women in Asia
- Women's rights
