= Rape in Saudi Arabia =

Rape in Saudi Arabia is regulated by Saudi Arabia's interpretation of Sharia law, under which someone convicted of the criminal offense of rape can be sentenced to a variety of punishments, ranging from flogging to execution. In 2019, eight executions took place in Saudi Arabia for rape.

As of 2002, Saudi Arabia reported 0.3 rapes per 100,000 people per year. There is no prohibition of marital rape in the country.

== Rape under Saudi Arabian law ==
Rape is regarded as a hudud crime by the Judges of Saudi Arabia which are viewed as the ordinances of God as per Islam and have fixed punishments derived from Islamic sources. A 1981 Saudi fatwa stipulates that offenses of sexual honour should be covered by hirabah (brigandage or highway robbery) a hadd crime which is an unusual interpretation and departs from classical Islamic jurisprudence. Two male witnesses or a confession from the perpetrator are needed as evidence to prove it but a judge can treat rape as a tazir crime, that is, an offense for which punishments are not stipulated in the Quran or Sunnah (the Islamic prophet Muhammad’s words, actions, and practices) meaning the punishment is left to the judge's discretion. This seems to allow circumstantial evidence but rape remains difficult to prove to Saudi’s conservative judiciary.

In Saudi Arabia, pregnancy can be used as evidence of sex having occurred and women who report rape or sexual violence can be deemed to have confessed to unlawful sex (zina) and be prosecuted and be punished by corporal punishments which can include punishments like floggings and even stoning.

== Reports ==
Human Rights Watch has investigated the situation, and their report concludes that a rape victim may be punished when they speak out against the crime. In one case, the victim's sentence was doubled for speaking out, and the court also harassed the victim's lawyer, going so far as to confiscate his professional licence.

However, it has also been acknowledged that Sharia law, which punishes rapists, serves as the basis of the country's legal system.

In 2009, the Saudi Gazette reported that a 23-year-old unmarried woman was sentenced to one year in prison and 100 lashes for adultery after the judge refused to believe that she was raped. This woman had been gang-raped, became pregnant, and had tried (unsuccessfully) to abort the fetus. The flogging was postponed until after the delivery.

The Qatif rape case is a much-publicized gang rape case. The victims were a Shia teenage girl from Qatif and her male companion, who were kidnapped and gang-raped by seven Saudi men in mid-2006. A Saudi Sharia court sentenced the perpetrators to varying sentences involving 80 to 1,000 lashes and imprisonment up to ten years for four of them. The court also sentenced the two victims to six months in prison and 90 lashes each for "being alone with a man who is not a relative" in a parked car. The appeals court doubled the victims' sentences in late 2007 as punishment for the heavy media coverage of the event in the international press regarding the treatment of women in the Kingdom of Saudi Arabia and Saudi judicial practices. In December 2007, the King Abdullah issued an official pardon for the two victims, citing his ultimate authority to revise "discretionary" punishments in accordance with the public good, although the pardon did not reflect any lack of confidence in the Saudi justice system or in the fairness of the verdicts.

The Saudi Justice ministry said the rape could not be proved as there were no witnesses and the rapists had recanted the confessions they originally had made during interrogation. Sharia (Islamic law) allows defendants to deny signed confessions, according to Abdul-Aziz al-Gassem, a lawyer who was not involved in the case. Punishment in such cases is still possible if convicted, but the verdict is lighter.

== See also ==
- Qatif rape case - Gang rape case, around 2006
- Women's rights in Saudi Arabia
