= Abortion in Saudi Arabia =

Abortion in Saudi Arabia is only legal in cases of risk to a woman's life, fetal impairment, or to protect her physical and mental health. Pregnancy arising from incest or rape also qualifies for a legal abortion under the mental health exemption. The fetus must be less than four months old, and if older, requires a panel of approved specialists to declare that the pregnancy will result in the death of the woman or serious damage to her health. Any approved abortion requires consent from three physicians as well as the patient and her partner. If an abortion is performed on a woman for any other reason, the violator may be required to pay blood money to the unborn child's family. Laws explicitly deny abortion to families who fear financial instability or an inability to provide the child with education. The selling of pills which can cause an abortion is illegal and can result in arrest.

According to the US-based Centre for Reproductive Studies, Saudi Arabia's abortion laws are relatively more permissive compared to other countries of the Middle East and North Africa regions.

== See also ==
- Women's rights in Saudi Arabia
