= Qatif rape case =

Gang rape case

The Qatif rape case (Arabic: قضية اغتصاب فتاة القطيف) is a much-publicized gang rape case. The victims were a Shia young woman from Qatif (Eastern Province, Saudi Arabia) and her male companion, who were kidnapped and gang-raped by seven Saudi men in mid-2006. A Saudi Sharia court sentenced the perpetrators to varying sentences involving 100 to 1,000 lashes and imprisonment up to ten years for four of them. The court also sentenced the two victims to six months in prison and 90 lashes each for "being alone with a man who is not a relative" in a parked car. The appeals court doubled the victims' sentences in late 2007 as punishment for the heavy media coverage of the event in the international press regarding the treatment of women in the Kingdom of Saudi Arabia and Saudi judicial practices. In December 2007, the Saudi King Abdullah issued an official pardon for the two victims, citing his ultimate authority to revise "discretionary" punishments in accordance with the public good, although the pardon did not reflect any lack of confidence in the Saudi justice system or in the fairness of the verdicts.

== Rape ==
The victim told Human Rights Watch and an Associated Press reporter, Farida Deif:

I knew him when I was ten, but I only knew him through telephone conversations, his voice was all I knew about him. He then threatened to tell my family about it if I didn’t give him a picture of myself. Months later I asked him to give it back since I got engaged to be married, so we agreed to meet near the City Plaza mall located fifteen minutes away from my house. When we were heading back, a car stopped right in front of his and two men carrying knives came out. I told him not to unlock the doors but he did, and I started screaming. They drove for a long time while we were forced to keep our heads down. When we arrived I noticed a lot of palm trees. They took me out to a dark area and forced me to take off my clothes. The first man with the knife raped me. He destroyed me. I thought about running away but where could I go to looking like this? Another man came in and did the same. I was about to faint. For more than two hours I asked them to leave me alone, I begged them. The third man was violent and the fourth almost strangled me. The fifth and sixth were even more brutal. When the seventh man finished I couldn't feel myself anymore. He was so fat I couldn't breathe. Then they all did it again. When they dropped me home I couldn't walk, my mom opened the door and said I looked sick. I couldn't tell anyone and for a whole week I couldn't eat, but later I went to the hospital.

In other interviews, more of the victims' relatives spoke up about how the assailants used pictures they took of them during the rape and they taunted her about the phone numbers they got from her cell phone and threatened her and her family. Parts of these interviews were published in Saiydati magazine.

== Court's findings and verdicts ==
=== First verdict ===
Four months after the assault, the female victim and her husband, along with their lawyer, decided to bring the case to court. A trial date was set in October 2006 and she was sentenced to 90 lashes for "being alone with a man who is not a relative," which is considered an offense in strict Wahhabi jurisprudence. Saudi judges make courtroom decisions based on their interpretation of Sharia law, which is the basis of Saudi law. The fact that a judge's interpretation of the law is not based on a written legal code can lead to disparate decisions between judges; this system can draw internal and international ire for its inconsistencies.

=== Appeal ===
After the appeal, the Supreme Judicial Council granted a retrial. The second court rulings made headlines in Saudi Arabia and around the world. On November 13, 2007, the Qatif court sentenced both victims, to six months in jail and 200 lashes. The Saudi Justice Ministry itself officially stated that the woman's sentence (originally based on being alone with an unrelated man) was increased after she admitted to having an extramarital affair with the man whom she had given the picture to. Because adultery is a crime in Saudi Arabia, her sentence was increased for committing adultery and for lying to the police about the circumstances of the rape. "The Saudi justice minister expressed his regret about the media reports over the role of the woman in this case which put out false information and wrongly defend her."

The sentences of the seven men found guilty of abducting and repeatedly raping the two victims were also increased to between two and ten years each along with lashes up to 1000. The assailants were not given the death penalty (the normal punishment for rape) because according to the Ministry of Justice there were no witnesses and the initial confession made by the rapists was retracted.

=== Removing the victim’s lawyer ===
Among other sources of news, The Guardian reported on November 17, 2007, that "the victim's lawyer Al-Lahem's critics have called him an infidel and 'lawyer of homosexuals'. In the past he has been jailed and banned from traveling abroad.

Abdul Rahman al-Lahem, a lawyer focused on human rights-related cases in Saudi Arabia was accused by the judges of being "disruptive to the court," "disrespectful," and "showing ignorance of the court procedures," and so had his license suspended.

He was ordered to appear before a disciplinary committee at the Ministry of Justice on December 5, 2007, charged with criticizing the judiciary and publicly campaigning in the media.

Human rights organization Amnesty International, as well as the Middle East and North Africa Programme, criticized the persecution of al-Lahem.

Lawyer Khaled Al-Mutairi represented al-Lahem at a closed-door hearing in front of a disciplinary committee at the Justice Ministry in Riyadh before a three-member panel consisting of two judges and a lawyer. The hearing was postponed to an unspecified date and on January 19, 2008, al-Lahem's law license was returned to him (confiscated on November 14, 2007), although risk of the case being resumed remains. Al-Lahem declined to comment.

== Media attention ==
In a special report, the Lebanese Broadcasting Corporation channel covered the case in a show widely anticipated by many Saudi audiences. The show aired a live debate between al-Lahem and Ministry of Justice consultant and former judge Abdul-Mohsen Al-Obaikan. The female victim's husband participated via phone. The husband defended his wife, stating: "I'm not lacking in manhood or an Arab man's honor for defending a so-called 'cheating wife'." He also said, "I feel that in this catastrophe she exercised bad judgment by meeting this man, but how can you [Al-Obaikan] or anyone say she committed adultery?" In other interviews, he showed further support of his wife and said that "she shocked him when she insisted on pursuing justice although she is facing a harsh penalty." He also expressed his worries over her deteriorating physical and mental health.

By late November 2007, she was under effective house arrest and forbidden to speak at the risk of being taken into custody at any time. Her family's movements were being monitored by the religious police and their telephones were tapped.

== Royal pardon ==
On December 17, 2007, Saudi newspapers reported that King Abdullah had issued a pardon for the woman, citing his ultimate authority as monarch to overrule "discretionary" punishments (punishments not expressly prescribed by Islamic legal canon) in accordance with the public good. However, he maintained that the pardon did not reflect any lack of confidence in the Saudi justice system or the initial verdicts, and in fact the King trusted "that the verdicts are just and fair."

Although the pardon was welcomed by the victim, human rights activists voiced concern that it was not a practical solution to the problem, as "the pardon means that she did something wrong and was kindly pardoned later." They called for reform of the law and clear legislation that differentiates between rape and adultery, as there are many similar cases which do not receive such international exposure and not every victim will get a royal pardon afterward.

== Public response ==
- Human Rights Watch—Human Rights Watch called on Saudi King Abdullah bin Abdul Aziz to immediately void the verdict and drop all charges against the rape victim and to order the court to end its harassment of her lawyer.
- Then Sen. Hillary Clinton—"The latest example is the punishment of 200 lashes that a Saudi Arabian court has given to a victim—the victim—of a gang rape. This is an outrage." Clinton said in a statement.
- Then Sen. Barack Obama—"That the victim was sentenced at all is unjust, but that the court doubled the sentence because of efforts to call attention to the ruling is beyond unjust, I strongly urge the Department of State to condemn this ruling." Obama wrote in a letter to Secretary of State Condoleezza Rice.
- Saudi Foreign Minister, Prince Saud al-Faisal—During the Annapolis Peace Summit, Saudi Foreign Minister Prince Saud al-Faisal told reporters that he hoped the sentence would be revised, adding that "the ruling was used to vilify his government even though it was not responsible because courts are independent". "and the disturbing thing is that such usage of individual acts are meant to insult the Saudi people and the Saudi government."
- The Saudi Ministry of Justice's official statement—In an unprecedented step and a rather historic reaction from a governmental body in Saudi Arabia, the Ministry of Justice has issued a statement on the 24th of November 2007 through the official Saudi Press Agency "welcoming objective criticism that benefits the general good, away from emotional responses."
- Saudi Ambassador to the United States, Adel al-Jubeir—In a statement that was sent to CNN, Al-Jubeir stated that "justice will prevail."
- The U.S. State Department—The State Department voiced "astonishment" at the sentence, but stopped short of calling for it to be changed.

== See also ==
- Rape in Saudi Arabia
- Women's rights in Saudi Arabia
