= Abdul Rahman al-Lahim =

Abdul Rahman Al-Lahim (alternatively al-Lahem) (Arabic: عبد الرحمن اللاحم; born 1971) is a Saudi human rights lawyer active in defending the civil rights of Saudi citizens.

Al-Lahim was born in the deeply conservative Qassim region. Until the late 1990s, Al-Lahim, who holds a degree in sharia, was an Arabic teacher as well as an Islamist, active in As-Sahwa al-Islamiyya. He is married and the father of two.

He became committed to civil rights while attending "Sharia school" in Imam Muhammad ibn Saud Islamic University in Riyadh. According to analysts of his work, Al-Lahim is effective because "He not only crafts effective legal arguments, but he also understands the conservative forces that hold the gavel."

On 6 November 2004, Al-Lahim was arrested by Saudi authorities for defending three reform activists on trial in Saudi Arabia charged with "issuing statements and collecting as many signatures as possible on petitions" calling for reforms in the Kingdom as well as of calling for the adoption of a constitutional monarchy and "using Western terminology" in demanding political reforms. All three activists and Al-Lahem were released in early August 2005 at the intervention of King Abdullah.

In 2005, he defended a high school teacher, Mohammad Al-Harbi, who had been sentenced to a punishment of 750 public lashes for mocking religion by speaking out against terrorism. Al-Harbi later received a royal pardon and all charges were dropped.

In 2007, Al-Lahim also defended the rape victim known as the "Qatif girl" from a sentence of 200 public lashes and faced disbarment for taking her case. He was suspended from the case as a result of the appeal against the punishment and his licence, granted to Saudi lawyers by the ministry of justice, was revoked. He was charged with criticizing the judiciary and conducting activist campaigns in the media. Later his license was returned to him. Human rights organization Amnesty International criticized the persecution of al-Lahem.

A travel ban has been imposed against Al-Lahim since 2004 and protested by human right organizations.

In 2008, Al-Lahim was awarded The American Bar Association’s 2008 International Human Rights Lawyer Award in Vienna, although he was unable to attend due to his travel ban.

He started writing a column for Okaz Newspaper in April 2016.
