= Olayan Group =

Multinational corporation

The Olayan Group
- Type: Private
- Founded: 1947; 79 years ago
- Founder: Suliman S. Olayan
- Headquarters: Vaduz, Liechtenstein
- Key people: Khaled S. Olayan (director); Hutham S. Olayan (director); Lubna S. Olayan (director) Hani Lazkani (CEO)
- Website: http://www.olayan.com

The Olayan Group is a multinational enterprise established in 1947 by Saudi Arabian businessmen Suliman S. Olayan (5 November 1918 – 4 July 2002), with an actively managed portfolio of global investments. The group's primary parent company, Olayan Investments Company Establishment (OICE), is headquartered in Vaduz, Liechtenstein. The Group also has international offices in New York, London, Luxembourg, Athens, Riyadh, and Singapore. The Group’s parent for MENA investments and operations, Olayan Financing Company (OFC), is based in Riyadh. The Olayan Group invests internationally in both public and private equities, including real estate, as well as fixed income securities. Its multibillion-dollar portfolio is concentrated in North America, Europe, Asia and the Middle East.

The Olayan Group traces its origins back to the General Contracting Company (GCC), founded to work on the construction of the Trans-Arabian Pipeline alongside the American contracting company Bechtel. In the 1950s, Olayan created trading and insurance companies, and began investing in New York City and London markets. Since then, the group has diversified its activities with the establishment of affiliates and partnerships in many industries.
