= Suliman S. Olayan =

Saudi businessman

Sheikh Khaled Suliman Saleh Olayan

Founder of Olayan Group

Personal details
- Education: Masters of Business Administration
- Alma mater: The American University

Suliman Saleh Al Olayan (Arabic: سليمان صالح العليان; 5 November 1918 – 4 July 2002) was among Saudi Arabia's wealthiest businessmen. He is the founder of the Olayan Group and Suliman Saleh Olayan Foundation. He was former chairman of CI Capital Holding Co and he also served on the board at Housing & Development Bank.

== Biography and career ==
Orphaned at the age of six, Olayan had a humble beginning in the Kingdom. Olayan's wealth reflected his connections to the Al-Saud royal family among other things.

Initially working for ARAMCO from 1937 to 1947, he left to start his own trucking company, the first of over 50 companies he would create or own. Over a 55-year career as an independent businessman, he served as an entrepreneur, investor, and philanthropist. Under his guidance and leadership, The Olayan Group became both a leading diversified enterprise in Saudi Arabia and a major participant in global investing.

In 1918, Suliman Olayan was born into a merchant family. His father, Saleh, had recently returned from Medina, where he had been a spice trader. Suliman spent the first years of his life in his family's ancestral hometown.

Suliman's mother died just a few months after he was born, and his father died when he was still a child. When he was about 10 years old, Suliman traveled with his older brother by camel to the Persian Gulf coast and then by boat to Bahrain. In Bahrain, at the dawn of the age of oil in that part of the Persian Gulf, Suliman attended the American school, where he learned English, and then the Al Khalifa and Al Jafariya schools. He proved to be an exceptional student with a prodigious memory and an uncanny ability to see things not just as they were but as they could be. After leaving school in 1936, he went to work for the Bahrain Petroleum Company. A year later, he returned to Saudi Arabia to take a job with the California Arabian Standard Oil Company, the forerunner of the Arabian American Oil Company (Aramco). By 1947, Suliman had risen from transportation dispatcher to storehouse supervisor to a position in Government Relations. During King Abdul Aziz Al Saud's historic visit to Dhahran in April of that year, Suliman served as a company translator.

The story of his entrepreneurial journey begins in the town of Unayzah in North Central Saudi Arabia. For centuries, the town had been a haven for caravans venturing across the Najd, Saudi Arabia's heartland. The merchant families of Unayzah had developed important trading links with the world outside central Arabia - the cities on the Red Sea and Persian Gulf coast, which had ties to Africa and Asia. In the wake of World War II, the oil industry was expanding rapidly. Sensing a once-in-a-lifetime opportunity, Suliman set out on his own in the summer of 1947. With a personal loan secured on his home, he established General Contracting Company (GCC).

GCC's first customer was Bechtel, which was under contract to Aramco to manage the construction of the Trans-Arabian Pipeline (Tapline), a mammoth project designed to link the oil wells in Saudi Arabia's Eastern Province to a terminal in Lebanon on the Mediterranean Sea. GCC handled transportation and related services for the historic project.

Buoyed by GCC's success and with his entrepreneurial instincts and drive now in high gear, Suliman undertook a series of trailblazing projects in the 1950s. He played a key role in developing Saudi Arabia's earliest electrical power companies, founding the country's first public utility, the National Gas Company.

In 1954, he launched General Trading Company (GTC), the Group's food and consumer products distribution business. Also in 1954, Suliman was instrumental in introducing commercial insurance to Saudi Arabia, founding Arab Commercial Enterprises (ACE), which went on to become the largest insurance and reinsurance broker in the Middle East.

In the 1960s, Suliman turned to international equity investing, an activity which would eventually establish the Group as an influential participant in global capital markets.

Meanwhile, Suliman was also developing business alliances, pioneering in Saudi Arabia the concept of strategic partnerships and strengthening his relationship to Bechtel. Moreover, through GTC and GCC he acquired exclusive distributorships for Kimberly Clark, General Foods, Pillsbury, Hunt Wesson, Cummins Engine, Kenworth and Atlas Copco. In 1969, the Group obtained a license from Kimberly Clark to construct the first paper tissue converting plant in Saudi Arabia. The same year, GTC established one of the first cold storage and meat processing plants in the Kingdom, and the Group played a leading role with other Saudi and foreign investors to establish a large factory for manufacturing plastic pipe and fittings. Other joint manufacturing ventures with major multinationals followed.

In 1983 Suliman became one the world's sixty-four richest bankers, and his estimated net worth was reported to be $2 billion by a Business International report. Beginning in the late 1980s, the Group embarked on a series of new activities in Saudi Arabia, focusing on light manufacturing and franchising, reaching beyond the Kingdom to other Persian Gulf countries and the greater Middle East. At the same time, it consolidated and strengthened existing operations, a process that continues to this day.

In 2002, Forbes estimated his wealth at $7.6 billion.

He is survived by his son, Khaled Olayan, his three daughters, Hayat Olayan, Hutham Olayan, Lubna Olayan, and his wife Maryam.

== See also ==
- Olayan Group
