= Lubna Olayan =

Saudi businesswoman (born 1955)

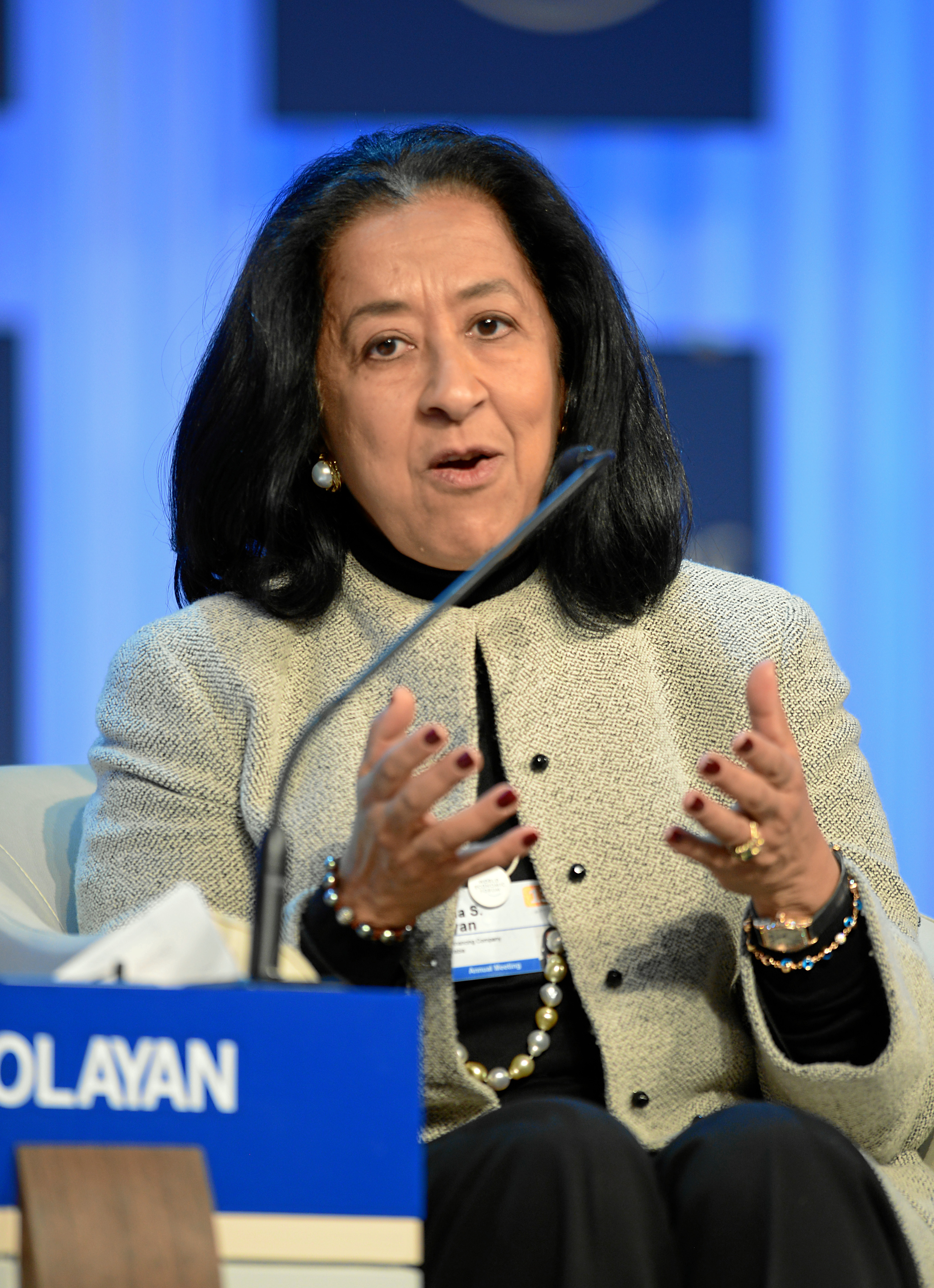
- Olayan in 2013
- Born: 4 August 1955 (age 71); Saudi Arabia
- Education: Cornell University (BS); Indiana University (MBA)
- Occupations: Businesswoman, investor
- Known for: Her leadership roles at the Olayan Group and as chairwoman of SABB
- Title: Chairwoman, Saudi British Bank
- Spouse: John Xefos
- Children: 3 daughters
- Parent: Sulaiman S. Olayan

Lubna Suliman al-Olayan (Arabic: لبنى سلیمان العليان; born 4 August 1955) is a Saudi businesswoman and former CEO and deputy chairman of Olayan Financing Company.

== Early life ==
Lubna Al-Olayan was born in Khobar, in the Eastern Province, and is the youngest child of Sheikh Sulaiman Al-Olayan, who is also the founder of the Olayan Group. Lubna is the CEO of Olayan Financing Group. She also worked at Morgan Guaranty Trust Bank in New York City from 1979 to 1981, before returning to Saudi Arabia to work again with the Olayan Company. She obtained a Bachelor of Science in Agriculture from Cornell University in the United States and a Master's degree in Business Administration from Indiana University.

== Career ==
She has been on the boards of WPP and Saudi Hollandi Bank (now Alawwal Bank), as well as the International Advisory Boards of Rolls-Royce and Citigroup.

Olayan was the Chief Executive Officer of Olayan Financing Company (OFC), the holding entity for The Olayan Group's operations in the Kingdom of Saudi Arabia and the Middle East until May 1st 2019, when she was replaced by Jonathan Franklin. She is on the board of the group along with her brother Khaled and sisters Hayat and Hutham. It is thought that the private family has accumulated a fortune that tops $10 billion. The group was founded in 1947 by her father, the late entrepreneur Sulaiman S. Olayan, The Olayan Group is a private multinational enterprise engaged in distribution, manufacturing, services and investments. OFC operates or actively participates in more than 40 companies, often in partnership with leading multinationals. OFC is also one of the largest investors in the Saudi and regional stock markets. In April 2019, Olayan announced her retirement as CEO of Olayan Financing Company.

In June 2019, Olayan was named chairwoman of the Saudi British Bank (SABB), making her the first Saudi woman to head a bank. She was reappointed in January 2020 for a three year term, and assumed to hold to the position after the merger between SABB and Alawwal Bank. In January 2023, she was again re-elected as the Chair of the Board of Directors (BOD) for another three-year term.

== Other activities ==
Olayan joined the Board of Directors of INSEAD in December 2005, and has been a member of its International Council since March 1997. In April 2007, she was elected as a member of the Board of Trustees for Cornell University. Olayan also joined the Advisory Board of Effat College, a private and non-profit girls college in Jeddah, Saudi Arabia, in April 2006. She is also a board member at Alfanar. She has been on the Board of Trustees of the "Arab Thought Foundation" since January 2002. Olayan was elected to the Board of the Down Syndrome Charitable Association in June 2005, a not-for-profit organization based in Riyadh. She was also appointed to the Board of Trustees of King Abdullah University for Science and Technology (KAUST). In June 2018, she was elected as a member of the MIT Corporation. In 2010, she was awarded the Cornell Entrepreneur of the Year. As of 2014, she is listed as the 86th most powerful woman in the world by Forbes. Olayan is on the board of trustees of the World Economic Forum.

== Personal life ==
She is married to John Xefos, an American attorney, and they have three daughters all residing in Riyadh, Saudi Arabia. She is the daughter of Saudi billionaire businessman Sulaiman Olayan.
