= Saudi Arabia =

Country in West Asia

Kingdom of Saudi Arabia المملكة العربية السعودية (Arabic) al-Mamlaka al-ʿArabiyya as-Suʿūdiyya
- Flag Emblem
- Motto: لَا إِلهَ إِلَّا اللَّهُ، مُحَمَّدٌ رَسُولُ اللَّهِ Lā ʾilāha ʾillā llāh, Muhammadun rasūlu llāh (Shahada) "There is no god but God; Muhammad is the messenger of God" (Note: The Shahādah (Statement of faith) is sometimes translated into English as 'There is no god but Allah', using the romanization of the Arabic word Allāh instead of its translation. The word Allāh (Arabic: اللَّٰه) literally translates as God.)
- Anthem: النشيد الوطني السعودي an-Našīd al-Waṭaniyy as-Suʿūdiyy "National Anthem of Saudi Arabia"
- Capital and largest city: Riyadh; 24°39′N 46°46′E
- Official languages: Arabic
- Religion: 96% Islam; 90%-95% Sunni (official); 5%-10% Shia
- Demonyms: Saudi; Saudi Arabian
- Government: Unitary Islamic absolute monarchy
  - King: Salman
  - Crown Prince and Prime Minister: Mohammed bin Salman
- Legislature: Consultative Assembly (Note: The Consultative Assembly does not possess the legislative powers of a typical parliament. It serves a consultative role, with the authority to summon ministers and government officials to question them regarding the performance of their ministries. It may also propose laws and amendments, although such proposals require approval through the government’s legislative process, with final decisions involving the Prime Minister and the Council of Ministers.)

Establishment
  - Emirate of Diriyah: 22 February 1727
  - Emirate of Nejd: 1824
  - Emirate of Riyadh: 15 January 1902
  - Emirate of Nejd and Hasa: 6 May 1913
  - Sultanate of Nejd: 2 November 1921
  - Kingdom of Hejaz and Nejd and Its Dependencies: 29 January 1927
  - Proclamation of the Kingdom of Saudi Arabia: 23 September 1932
  - Current constitution: 31 January 1992

Area
  - Total: 2,149,690 km^{2} (830,000 sq mi) (12th)
  - Water (%): 0.7

Population
  - 2026 census: ▲35,325,004 (47th)
  - Density: 16/km^{2} (41.4/sq mi) (208th)
- GDP (PPP): 2026 estimate
  - Total: ▼$2.729 trillion (17th)
  - Per capita: ▼$74,295 (19th)
- GDP (nominal): 2026 estimate
  - Total: ▲$1.343 trillion (19th)
  - Per capita: ▲$36,577 (37th)
- Gini (2019): ▼45.6 medium inequality (28th)
- HDI (2026): 0.900 very high (37th)
- Currency: Saudi riyal (SR) (Note: Pegged to the United States dollar (USD) at 3.75 riyals per USD since 1986) (SAR)
- Time zone: UTC+3 (SAST)
- Calling code: +966
- ISO 3166 code: SA
- Internet TLD: .sa; السعودية.

Saudi Arabia, (Note: /ˌsaʊdi əˈreɪbiə/ SOW-dee ə-RAY-bee-ə, also /ˌsɔːdi -/ SAW-dee -; Arabic: ٱلسُّعُودِيَّة, romanized: as-Suʿūdiyya, Arabic pronunciation: [s.su.ʕuː.dij.ja].) officially the Kingdom of Saudi Arabia (KSA), (Note: Arabic: ٱلْمَمْلَكَة ٱلْعَرَبِيَّة ٱلسُّعُودِيَّة, romanized: al-Mamlaka al-ʿArabiyya as-Suʿūdiyya, Arabic pronunciation: [lmam.la.ka‿l.ʕa.ra.bij.ja‿s.su.ʕuː.dij.ja],.) is a country in West Asia that occupies the bulk of the Arabian Peninsula. Covering a land area of approximately 2,149,690 km^{2} (830,000 sq mi), it is the fifth-largest country in Asia and the twelfth-largest in the world. It is bordered by the Red Sea to the west, Jordan, Iraq, and Kuwait to the north, the Persian Gulf, Bahrain, Qatar, and the United Arab Emirates to the east, Oman to the southeast, and Yemen to the south. The Gulf of Aqaba in the northwest separates it from Egypt and Israel. Riyadh is the capital and largest city, while other major centers include Jeddah and the two holiest cities in Islam, Mecca and Medina.

Pre-Islamic Arabia, the territory that constitutes Saudi Arabia, was the site of several ancient cultures and civilizations; the archaeological study of the prehistory of Saudi Arabia has identified some of the earliest traces of human activity outside Africa. Islam emerged in what is now Saudi Arabia in the early seventh century. Islamic prophet Muhammad united the population of the Arabian Peninsula and created a single Islamic religious polity. Following his death in 632, his followers expanded Muslim rule beyond Arabia, conquering territories in North Africa, Central, South Asia and Iberia within decades. Arab dynasties originating from modern-day Saudi Arabia founded the Rashidun (632–661), Umayyad (661–750), Zubayrid (683–692), Abbasid (750–1258), and Fatimid (909–1171) caliphates, as well as numerous other Muslim states in Asia, Africa, and Europe.

Saudi Arabia was founded in 1932 by King Abdulaziz, who united Hejaz, Najd, parts of Eastern Arabia and South Arabia into a single state through a series of military and political campaigns beginning in 1902. The Kingdom is the Third Saudi State and the successor to the First Saudi State (1727–1818) and the Second Saudi State (1824–1891). The country has since been governed as an absolute monarchy under the House of Saud. In its Basic Law, Saudi Arabia defines itself as a sovereign Arab Islamic state with Islam as its official religion and Arabic as its official language. The ultraconservative Wahhabi religious movement within Sunni Islam was the prevailing political and cultural force until the 2000s. The Saudi government has attracted criticism for various policies such as its intervention in the Yemeni Civil War, restrictions on political and civil liberties, and poor human rights record. Since the mid-2010s, Saudi Arabia has instituted limited and gradual reforms to liberalize social, cultural, and religious life.

Saudi Arabia is considered both a regional and middle power, in addition to being a major non-NATO ally of the United States. Since petroleum was discovered in the country in 1938, the kingdom has become the world's second-largest oil producer and leading oil exporter, controlling the world's second-largest oil reserves and sixth-largest gas reserves. Saudi Arabia is categorized as a World Bank high-income economy and is the only Arab country among the G20 major economies. The Saudi economy is the largest in the Middle East and the world's nineteenth-largest by nominal GDP and seventeenth-largest by PPP. Ranking very high in the Human Development Index, Saudi Arabia offers free university tuition, no personal income tax, and free universal health care. With its dependence on foreign labour, Saudi Arabia has the world's third-largest immigrant population, with foreign-born residents comprising roughly 40% of the population. Saudi Arabians are among the world's youngest people, with approximately half being under 25 years old. Saudi Arabia is a founding member of the Gulf Cooperation Council, United Nations, Organisation of Islamic Cooperation, Arab League, OPEC, and the Mecca Defence Alliance, as well as a dialogue partner of the Shanghai Cooperation Organisation and member of many other global organisations.

== Etymology ==
The geopolitical evolution of the modern Saudi state progressed through a series of official territorial designations under King Abdulaziz, moving from the Emirate of Riyadh (1902 to 1913) to the Emirate of Nejd and Hasa (1913 to 1921), the Sultanate of Nejd (1921 to 1926), and the Kingdom of Hejaz and Nejd and Its Dependencies (1926 to 1932).

To consolidate these regional titles into a single national identity, notables and leaders from the Hejaz met in Taif in 1932 and proposed a unified name for the country. They selected "Saud" (an Arabic name signifying "happiness" or "prosperity") in recognition of Muhammad bin Saud, who founded the First Saudi State and the House of Saud in 1727. King Abdulaziz approved the national petition, and Royal Decree No. 2716 was issued, officially establishing The Kingdom of Saudi Arabia. The designation was publicly broadcast from the holy city of Mecca on 23 September 1932 by Prince Faisal, aligning with classical Arabic historiographical traditions of naming states after their foundational lineages, much like the Umayyad and Abbasid eras.

== History ==
=== Prehistory ===
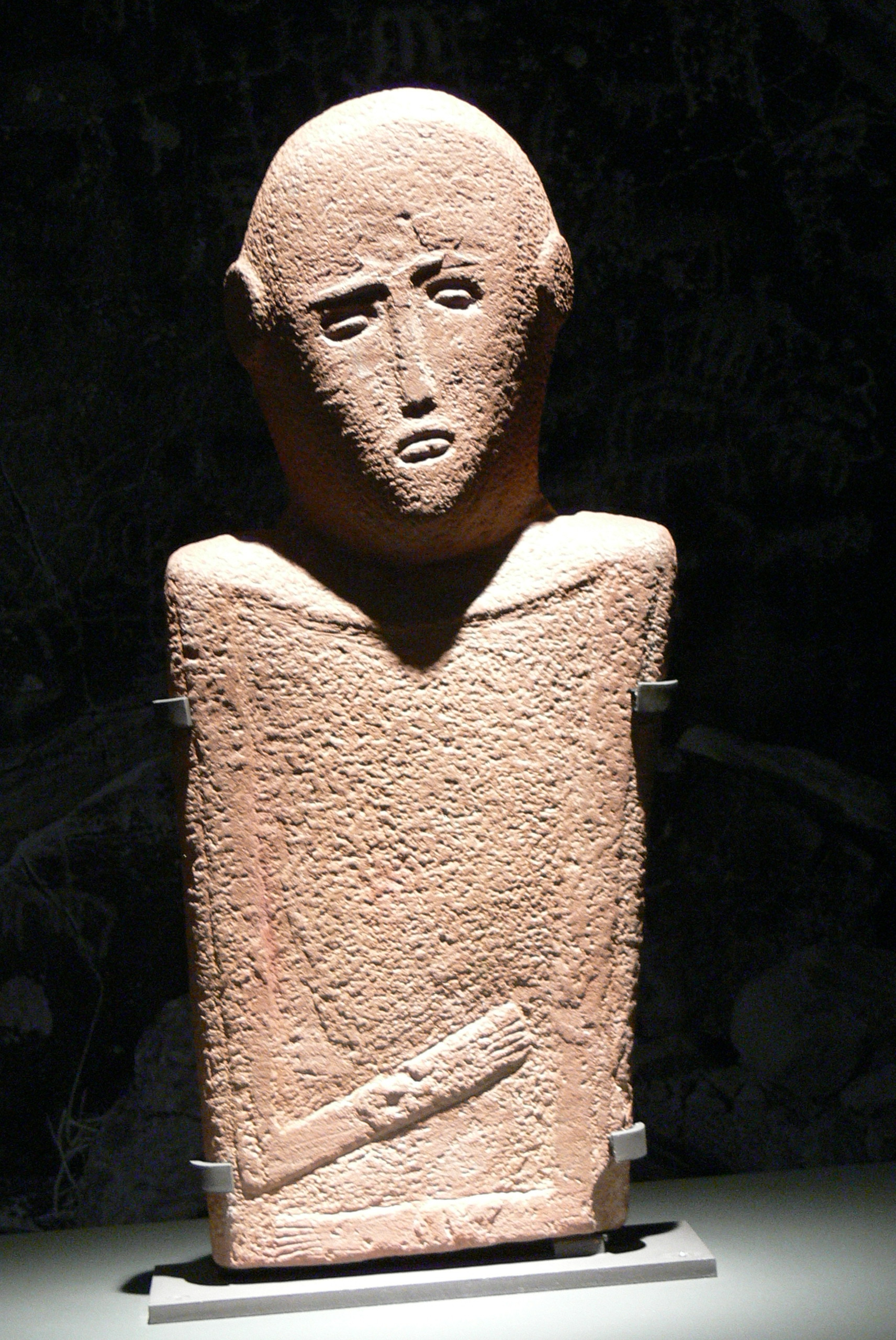
Anthropomorphic stela (4th millennium BCE) from El-Maakir-Qaryat al-Kaafa

There is evidence that human habitation in the Arabian Peninsula dates back to about 125,000 years ago. A 2011 study found that the first modern humans to spread east across Asia left Africa about 75,000 years ago across the Bab-el-Mandeb connecting the Horn of Africa and Arabia. The Arabian Peninsula is regarded as central to the understanding of evolution and dispersals of humanity. Arabia underwent an extreme environmental fluctuation in the Quaternary that led to profound evolutionary and demographic changes. Arabia's rich Lower Paleolithic record, marked by numerous Oldowan-like sites, indicates a significant role in the early hominin colonization of Eurasia.

In the Neolithic period, prominent cultures such as Al-Magar, whose centre lay in modern-day southwestern Najd, flourished. Al-Magar could be considered a "Neolithic Revolution" in human knowledge and handicraft skills. The culture is characterized as being one of the world's first to involve the widespread domestication of animals, particularly the horse. Al-Magar statues were made from local stone, and it seems that the statues were fixed in a central building that might have had a significant role in the social and religious life of the inhabitants.

In 2017, hunting scenes showing images of most likely domesticated dogs (resembling the Canaan Dog) were discovered in northwestern Saudi Arabia. These rock engravings date back more than 8,000 years, making them the earliest depictions of dogs in the world.

At the end of the 4th millennium BCE, Arabia entered the Bronze Age; metals were widely used, and the period was characterized by its 2 m high burials which were simultaneously followed by the existence of numerous temples that included many free-standing sculptures originally painted with red colours.

In May 2021, archaeologists announced that a 350,000-year-old Acheulean site named An Nasim in the Hail region could be the oldest human habitation site in northern Saudi Arabia. Paleolithic artefacts are similar to material remains uncovered at the Acheulean sites in the Nefud Desert.

=== Pre-Islamic ===
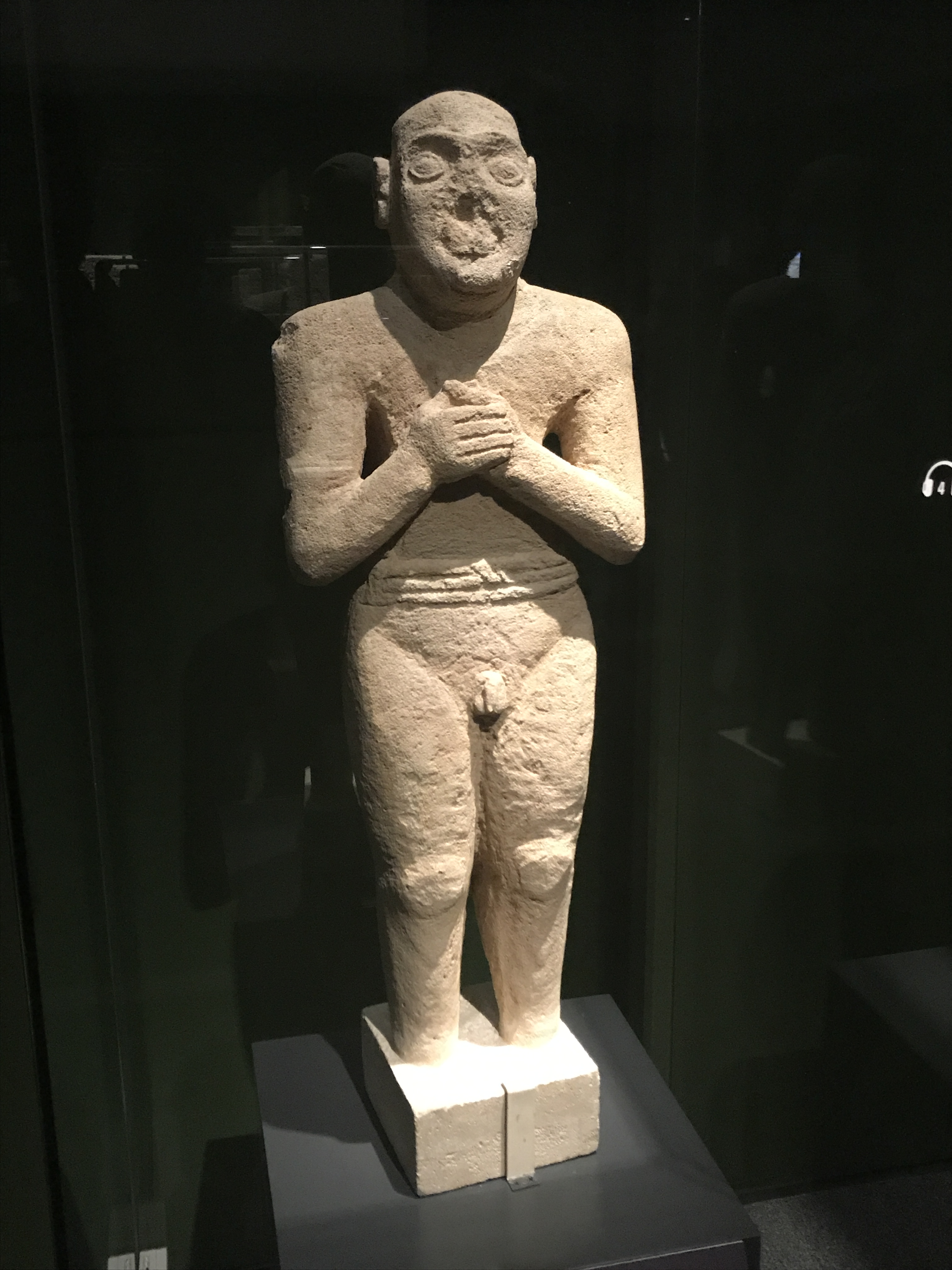
The "Worshipping Servant" statue (2500 BCE), above one metre (3 ft 3 in) in height, is much taller than any possible Mesopotamian or Harappan models. Photo courtesy of the National Museum of Korea.

The earliest sedentary culture in Saudi Arabia dates to the Ubaid period at Dosariyah. Climatic change and the onset of aridity may have brought about the end of this phase of settlement, as little archaeological evidence exists from the succeeding millennium. The settlement of the region picks up again in the period of Dilmun in the early 3rd millennium. Known records from Uruk refer to a place called Dilmun, associated on several occasions with copper, and in later periods it was a source of imported woods in southern Mesopotamia. Scholars have suggested that Dilmun originally designated the Eastern Province, notably linked with the major Dilmunite settlements of Umm an-Nussi and Umm ar-Ramadh in the interior and Tarout on the coast. It is likely that Tarout Island was the main port and the capital of Dilmun. Mesopotamian inscribed clay tablets suggest that, in the early period of Dilmun, a hierarchical organized political structure existed. In 1966, an earthwork in Tarout exposed an ancient burial field that yielded a large statue dating to the Dilmunite period (mid 3rd millennium BCE). The statue was locally made under the strong Mesopotamian influence on the artistic principle of Dilmun.

By 2200 BCE, the centre of Dilmun shifted for unknown reasons from Tarout and the Saudi Arabian mainland to the island of Bahrain, and a highly developed settlement emerged there, where a laborious temple complex and thousands of burial mounds dating to this period were discovered.

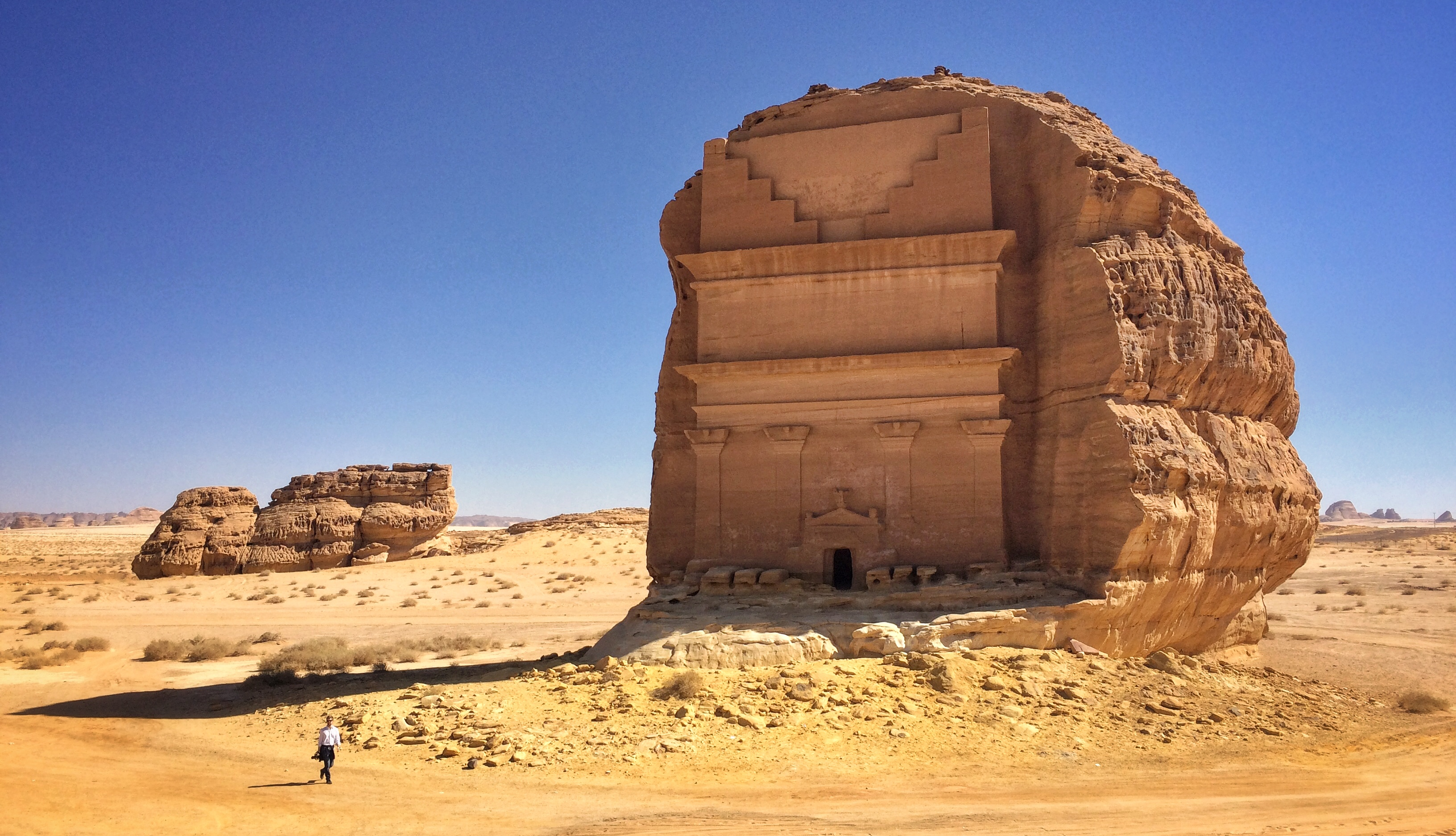
Qaṣr Al-Farīd, the largest of the 131 rock-cut monumental tombs built from the 1st century BCE to the 1st century CE, with their elaborately ornamented façades, at the extensive ancient Nabatean archaeological site of Hegra located in the area of Al-'Ula within Al Madinah Region in the Hejaz. A UNESCO World Heritage Site since 2008.

By the late Bronze Age, a historically recorded people and land (Midian and the Midianites) in the north-western portion of Saudi Arabia are well-documented in the Bible. Centred in Tabouk, it stretched from Wadi Arabah in the north to the area of al-Wajh in the south. The capital of Midian was Qurayyah, it consists of a large, fortified citadel encompassing 35 hectares and below it lies a walled settlement of 15 hectares. The city hosted as many as 12,000 inhabitants. The Bible recounts Israel's two wars with Midian, in the early 11th century BCE. Politically, the Midianites were described as having a decentralized structure headed by five kings (Evi, Rekem, Tsur, Hur, and Reba); the names appear to be toponyms of important Midianite settlements. It is common to view that Midian designated a confederation of tribes, the sedentary element settled in the Hijaz while its nomadic affiliates pastured and sometimes pillaged as far away as Palestine. The nomadic Midianites were one of the earliest exploiters of the domestication of camels that enabled them to navigate through the harsh terrains of the region.

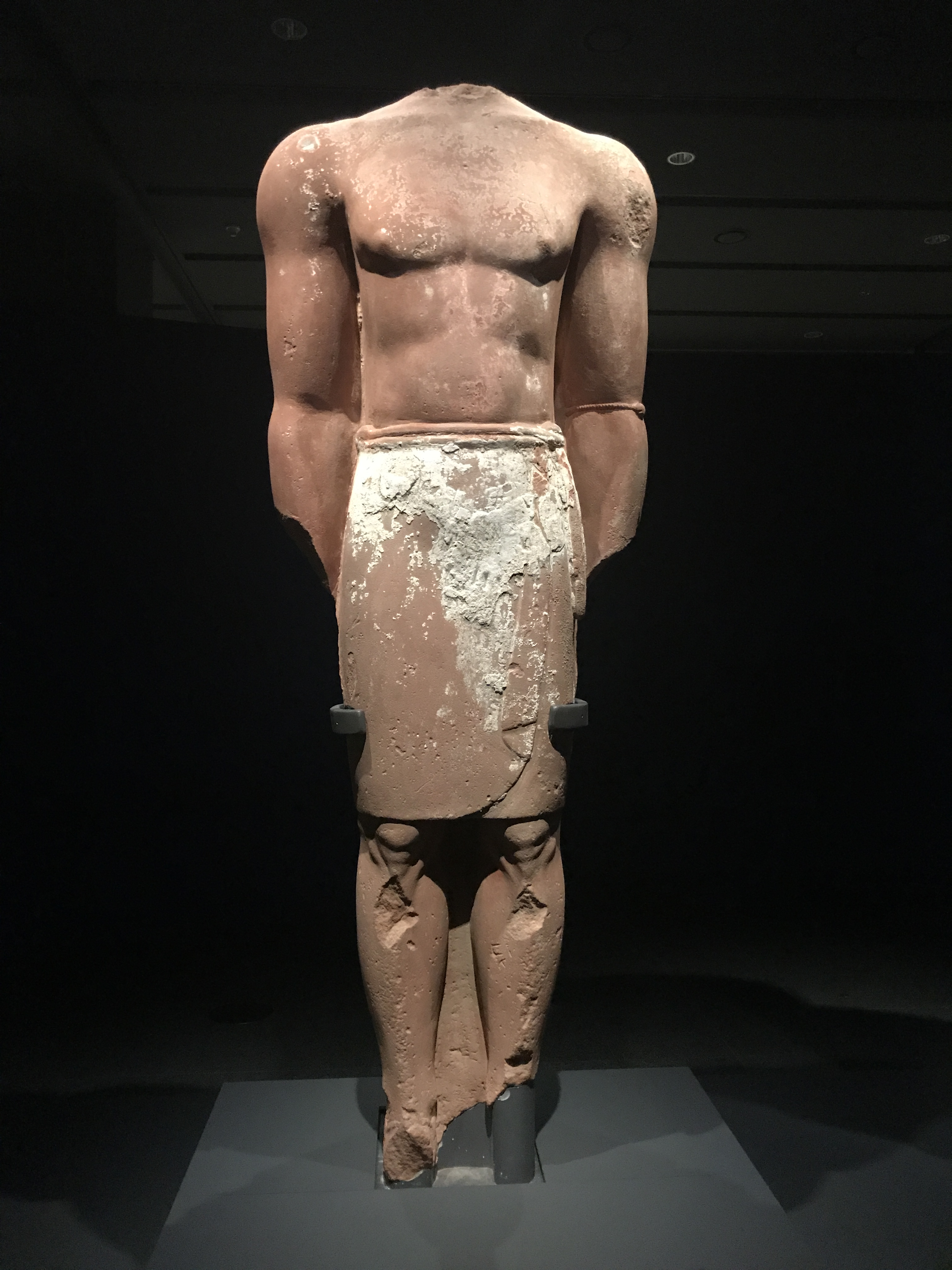
Colossal statue from Al-'Ula in the Hejaz (6th–4th century BCE); it followed the standardized artistic sculpting of the Lihyanite kingdom.

At the end of the 7th century BCE, an emerging kingdom appeared in north-western Arabia. It started as a sheikdom of Dedan, which developed into the kingdom of Lihyan. During this period, Dedan transformed into a kingdom that encompassed a much wider domain. In the early 3rd century BCE, with bustling economic activity between the south and north, Lihyan acquired large influence suitable to its strategic position on the caravan road. The Lihyanites ruled over a large domain from Yathrib in the south and parts of the Levant in the north. In antiquity, Gulf of Aqaba used to be called Gulf of Lihyan, a testimony to the extensive influence that Lihyan acquired.

The Lihyanites fell into the hands of the Nabataeans around 65 BCE upon their seizure of Hegra then marching to Tayma, and to their capital Dedan in 9 BCE. The Nabataeans ruled large portions of north Arabia until their domain was annexed by the Roman Empire, which renamed it Arabia Petraea, and remained under the rule of the Romans until 630.

=== Middle Ages and rise of Islam ===
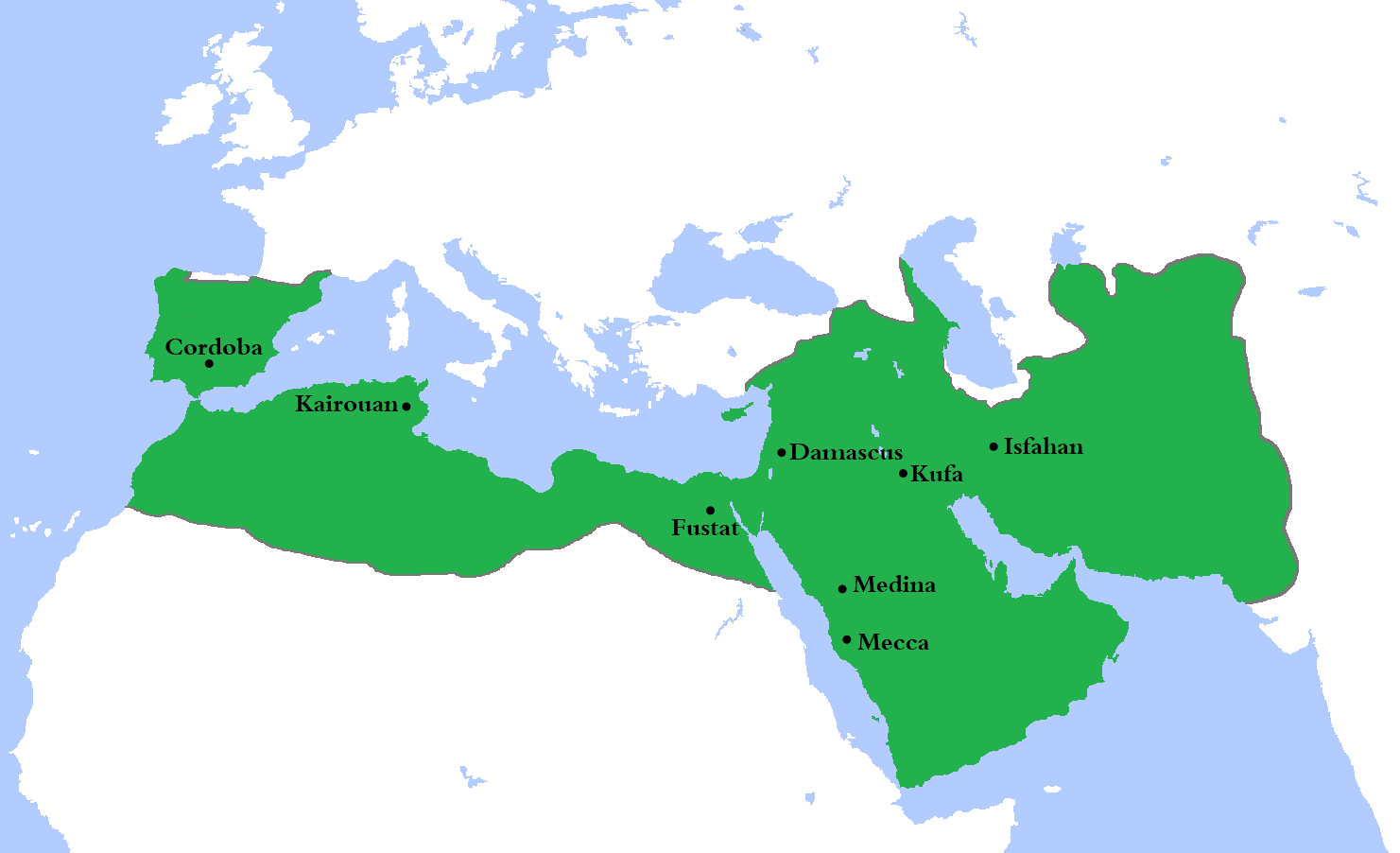
At its greatest extent, the Umayyad Caliphate (661–750) covered 11100000 km^{2} (4300000 sq mi) and 62 million people (29 per cent of the world's population), making it one of the largest empires in history in both area and proportion of the world's population. It was also larger than any previous empire in history.

Shortly before the advent of Islam, apart from urban trading settlements (such as Mecca and Medina), much of what was to become Saudi Arabia was populated by nomadic pastoral tribal societies. Muhammad was born in Mecca in about 570 CE. In the early 7th century, Muhammad united the various tribes of the peninsula and created a single Islamic religious polity. Following his death in 632, his followers expanded the territory under Muslim rule beyond Arabia, conquering territory in the Iberian Peninsula in the west, to parts of Central and South Asia in the east, in a matter of decades. Arabia became a more politically peripheral region of the Muslim world as the focus shifted to the newly conquered lands.

Arabs originating from modern-day Saudi Arabia, the Hejaz in particular, founded the Rashidun (632–661), Umayyad (661–750), Abbasid (750–1517), and the Fatimid (909–1171) caliphates. From the 10th century to the early 20th century, Mecca and Medina were under the control of a local Arab ruler known as the Sharif of Mecca, but at most times the Sharif owed allegiance to the ruler of one of the major Islamic empires based in Baghdad, Cairo or Istanbul. Most of the remainder of what became Saudi Arabia reverted to traditional tribal rule.

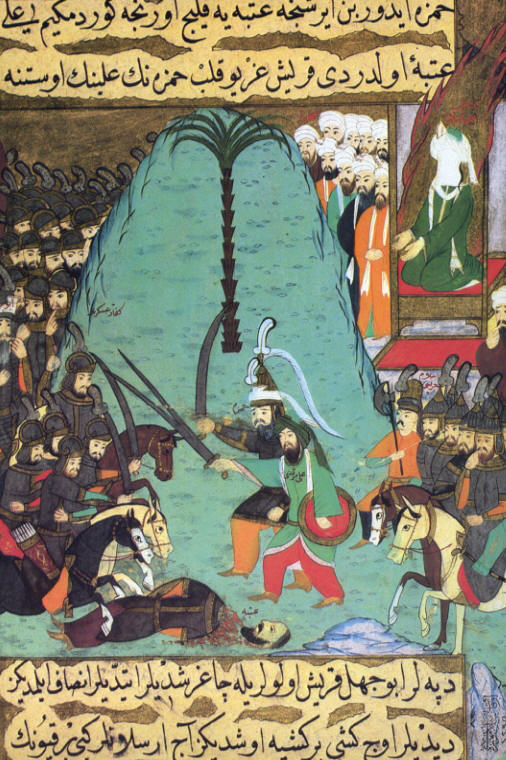
The Battle of Badr, 13 March 624 CE

For much of the 10th century, the Isma'ili-Shi'ite Qarmatians were the most powerful force in the Persian Gulf. In 930, the Qarmatians pillaged Mecca, outraging the Muslim world, particularly with their theft of the Black Stone. In 1077–1078, an Arab sheikh named Abdullah bin Ali Al Uyuni defeated the Qarmatians in Bahrain and al-Hasa with the help of the Seljuq Empire and founded the Uyunid dynasty. The Uyunid Emirate later underwent expansion, with its territory stretching from Najd to the Syrian Desert. They were overthrown by the Usfurids in 1253. Usfurid rule was weakened after Persian rulers of Hormuz captured Bahrain and Qatif in 1320. The vassals of Ormuz, the Shia Jarwanid dynasty came to rule eastern Arabia in the 14th century. The Jabrids took control of the region after overthrowing the Jarwanids in the 15th century and clashed with Hormuz for more than two decades over the region for its economic revenues, until finally agreeing to pay tribute in 1507. Al-Muntafiq tribe later took over the region and came under Ottoman suzerainty. The Bani Khalid tribe later revolted against them in the 17th century and took control. Their rule extended from Iraq to Oman at its height, and they too came under Ottoman suzerainty.

=== Ottoman Hejaz and Portuguese era ===
In the 16th century, the Ottomans added the Red Sea and Persian Gulf coast (the Hejaz, Aseer and Al-Ahsa) to the empire and claimed suzerainty over the interior. One reason was to thwart Portuguese attempts to attack the Red Sea (hence the Hejaz) and the Indian Ocean. The Ottoman degree of control over these lands varied over the next four centuries with the fluctuating strength or weakness of the empire's central authority. These changes contributed to later uncertainties, such as the dispute with Transjordan over the inclusion of the sanjak of Ma'an, including the cities of Ma'an and Aqaba.

=== Saud dynasty and unification ===
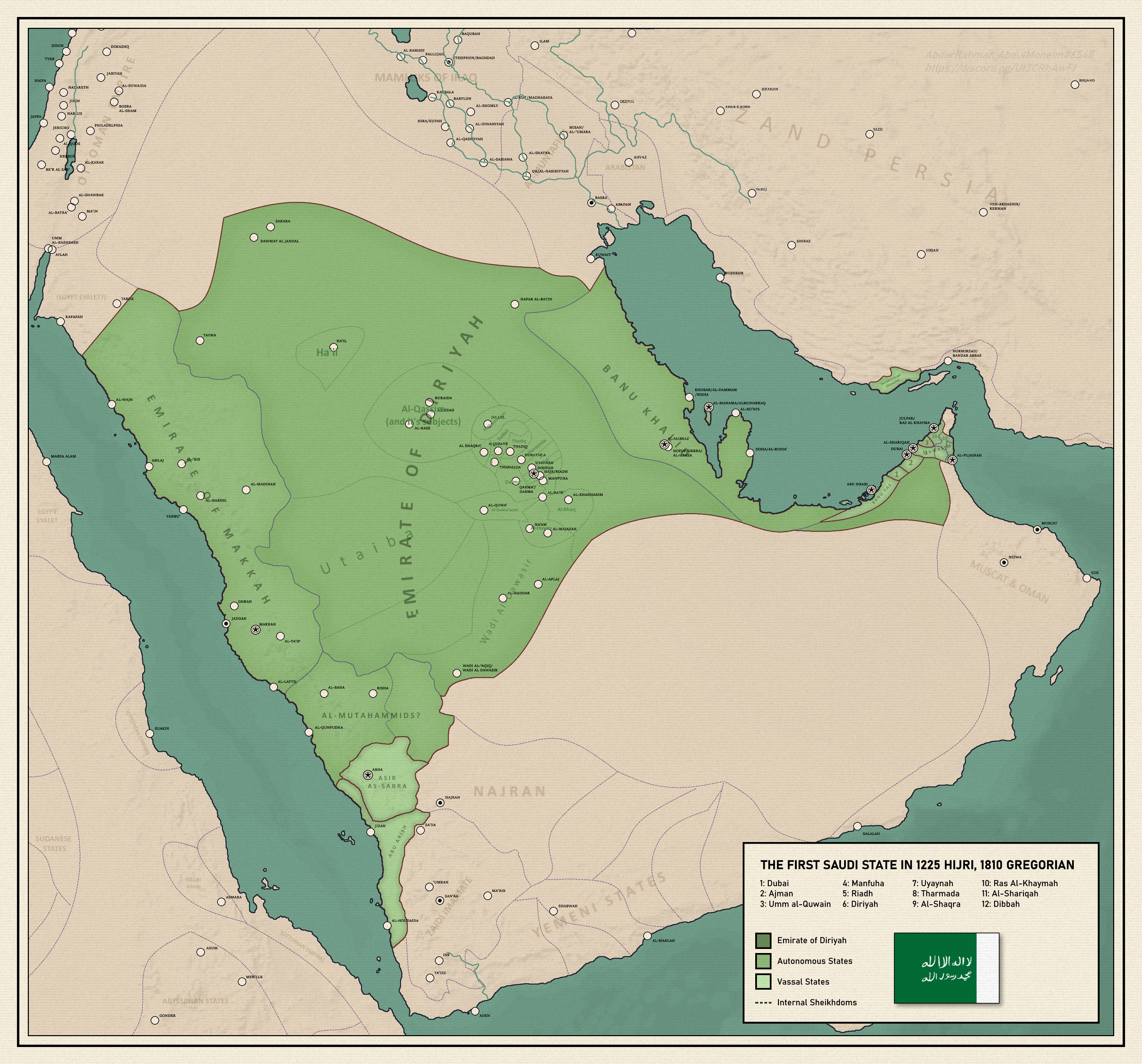
Expansion of the first Saudi State in 1810

The emergence of what was to become the Saudi royal family, known as the Al Saud, began at the town of Diriyah in central Arabia with the accession as emir of Muhammad bin Saud on 22 February 1727. In 1744, he joined forces with the religious leader Muhammad ibn Abd al-Wahhab, founder of the Wahhabi movement, a strict puritanical form of Sunni Islam. This alliance provided the ideological impetus to Saudi expansion and remains the basis of Saudi Arabian dynastic rule today.

The Emirate of Diriyah established in the area around Riyadh rapidly expanded and briefly controlled most of the present-day territory of Saudi Arabia, sacking Karbala in 1802, and capturing Mecca in 1803. In 1818, it was destroyed by the Ottoman viceroy of Egypt, Mohammed Ali Pasha. The much smaller Emirate of Nejd was established in 1824. Throughout the rest of the 19th century, the Al Saud contested control of the interior of what was to become Saudi Arabia with another Arabian ruling family, the Al Rashid, who ruled the Emirate of Jabal Shammar. By 1891, the Al Rashid were victorious and the Al Saud were driven into exile in Kuwait.

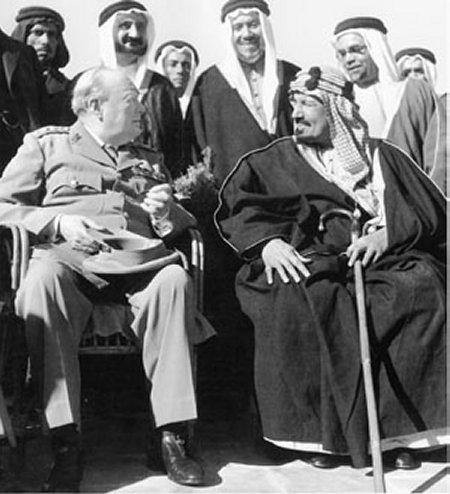
British Prime Minister Winston Churchill and Ibn Saud, the founding father and first king of Saudi Arabia, in Egypt in 1945

At the beginning of the 20th century, the Ottoman Empire continued to control or have a suzerainty over most of the peninsula. Subject to this suzerainty, Arabia was ruled by a patchwork of tribal rulers, with the Sharif of Mecca having pre-eminence and ruling the Hejaz. In 1902, Abdul Rahman's son, Abdulaziz—later known as Ibn Saud—recaptured control of Riyadh bringing the Al Saud back to Nejd, creating the third "Saudi state". Ibn Saud gained the support of the Ikhwan, a tribal army inspired by Wahhabism and led by Faisal Al-Dawish, and which had grown quickly after its foundation in 1912. With the aid of the Ikhwan, Ibn Saud captured Al-Ahsa from the Ottomans in 1913.

In 1916, with the encouragement and support of Britain (which was fighting the Ottomans in World War I), the Sharif of Mecca, Hussein bin Ali, led a pan-Arab Revolt against the Ottoman Empire to create a united Arab state. Although the revolt failed in its objective, the Allied victory in World War I resulted in the end of Ottoman suzerainty and control in Arabia, and Hussein bin Ali became King of Hejaz.

Ibn Saud avoided involvement in the Arab Revolt and instead continued his struggle with the Al Rashid. Following the latter's final defeat, he took the title Sultan of Nejd in 1921. With the help of the Ikhwan, the Kingdom of Hejaz was conquered in 1924–25, and on 10 January 1926, Ibn Saud declared himself king of Hejaz. For the next five years, he administered the two parts of his dual kingdom as separate units.

After the conquest of the Hejaz, the Ikhwan leadership's objective switched to expansion of the Wahhabist realm into the British protectorates of Transjordan, Iraq and Kuwait, and began raiding those territories. This met with Ibn Saud's opposition, as he recognized the danger of a direct conflict with the British. At the same time, the Ikhwan became disenchanted with Ibn Saud's domestic policies which appeared to favour modernization and the increase in the number of non-Muslim foreigners in the country. As a result, they turned against Ibn Saud and, after a two-year struggle, were defeated in 1929 at the Battle of Sabilla, where their leaders were massacred. On Ibn Saud's behalf, Prince Faisal declared the unification on 23 September 1932, and the two kingdoms of Hejaz and Nejd were unified as the Kingdom of Saudi Arabia. That date is now a national holiday called Saudi National Day.

=== 20th century ===
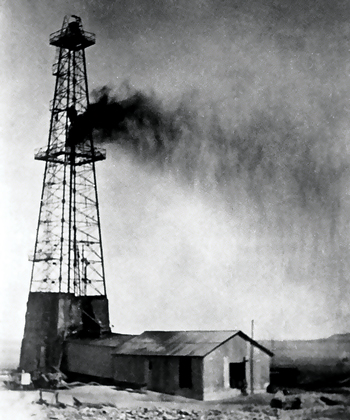
The oil well Dammam No. 7 on March 4, 1938, the day it struck oil in commercial quantities, becoming the first in Saudi Arabia to do so

The new kingdom was reliant on limited agriculture and pilgrimage revenues. In 1938, vast reserves of oil were discovered in the Al-Ahsa region along the coast of the Persian Gulf, and full-scale development of the oil fields began in 1941 under the US-controlled Aramco (Arabian American Oil Company). Oil provided Saudi Arabia with economic prosperity and substantial political leverage internationally. Cultural life rapidly developed, primarily in the Hejaz, which was the centre for newspapers and radio. However, the large influx of foreign workers in Saudi Arabia in the oil industry increased the pre-existing propensity for xenophobia. At the same time, the government became increasingly wasteful and extravagant. By the 1950s this had led to large governmental deficits and excessive foreign borrowing. In 1953, Saud of Saudi Arabia succeeded as the king of Saudi Arabia. In 1964 he was deposed in favour of his half brother Faisal of Saudi Arabia, after an intense rivalry, fuelled by doubts in the royal family over Saud's competence. In 1972, Saudi Arabia gained a 20% control in Aramco, thereby decreasing US control over Saudi oil. In 1973, Saudi Arabia led an oil boycott against the Western countries that supported Israel in the Yom Kippur War against Egypt and Syria, leading to the quadrupling of oil prices. In 1975, Faisal was assassinated by his nephew, Prince Faisal bin Musaid and was succeeded by his half-brother King Khalid.

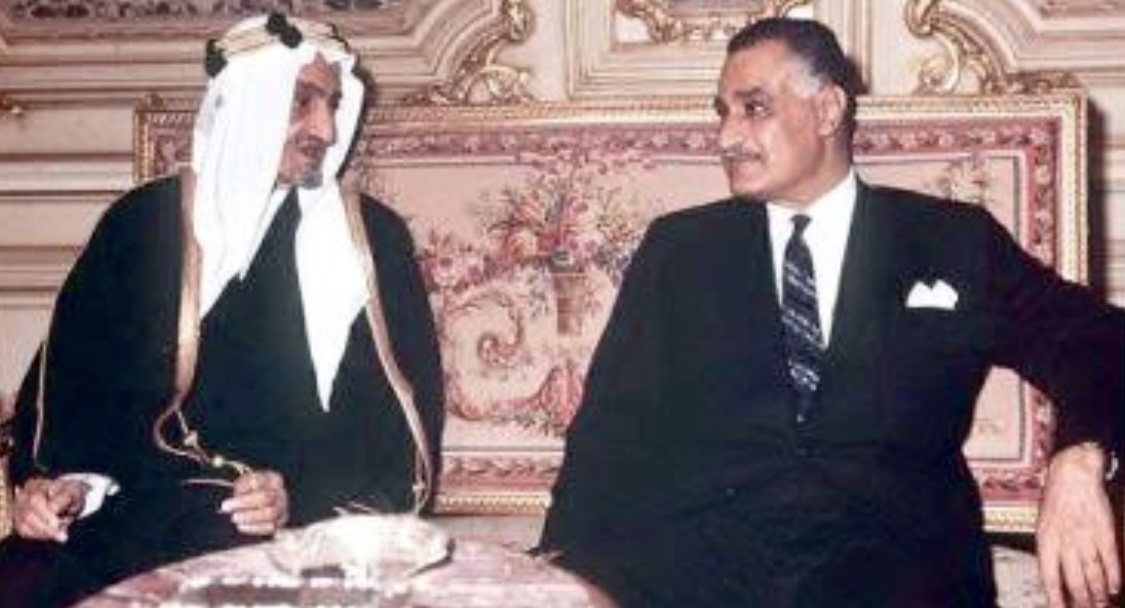
Faisal (left) with Egypt's President Gamal Abdel Nasser in Cairo, 1969

By 1976, Saudi Arabia had become the largest oil producer in the world. Khalid's reign saw economic and social development progress at an extremely rapid rate, transforming the infrastructure and educational system of the country; in foreign policy, close ties with the US were developed. In 1979, two events occurred which greatly concerned the government and had a long-term influence on Saudi foreign and domestic policy. The first was the Iranian Islamic Revolution. It was feared that the country's Shi'ite minority in the Eastern Province (which is also the location of the oil fields) might rebel under the influence of their Iranian co-religionists. There were several anti-government uprisings in the region such as the 1979 Qatif Uprising. The second event was the Grand Mosque Seizure in Mecca by Islamist extremists. The militants involved were in part angered by what they considered to be the corruption and un-Islamic nature of the Saudi government. The government regained control of the mosque after 10 days, and those captured were executed. Part of the response of the royal family was to enforce the much stricter observance of traditional religious and social norms in the country (for example, the closure of cinemas) and to give the ulema a greater role in government. Neither entirely succeeded as Islamism continued to grow in strength.

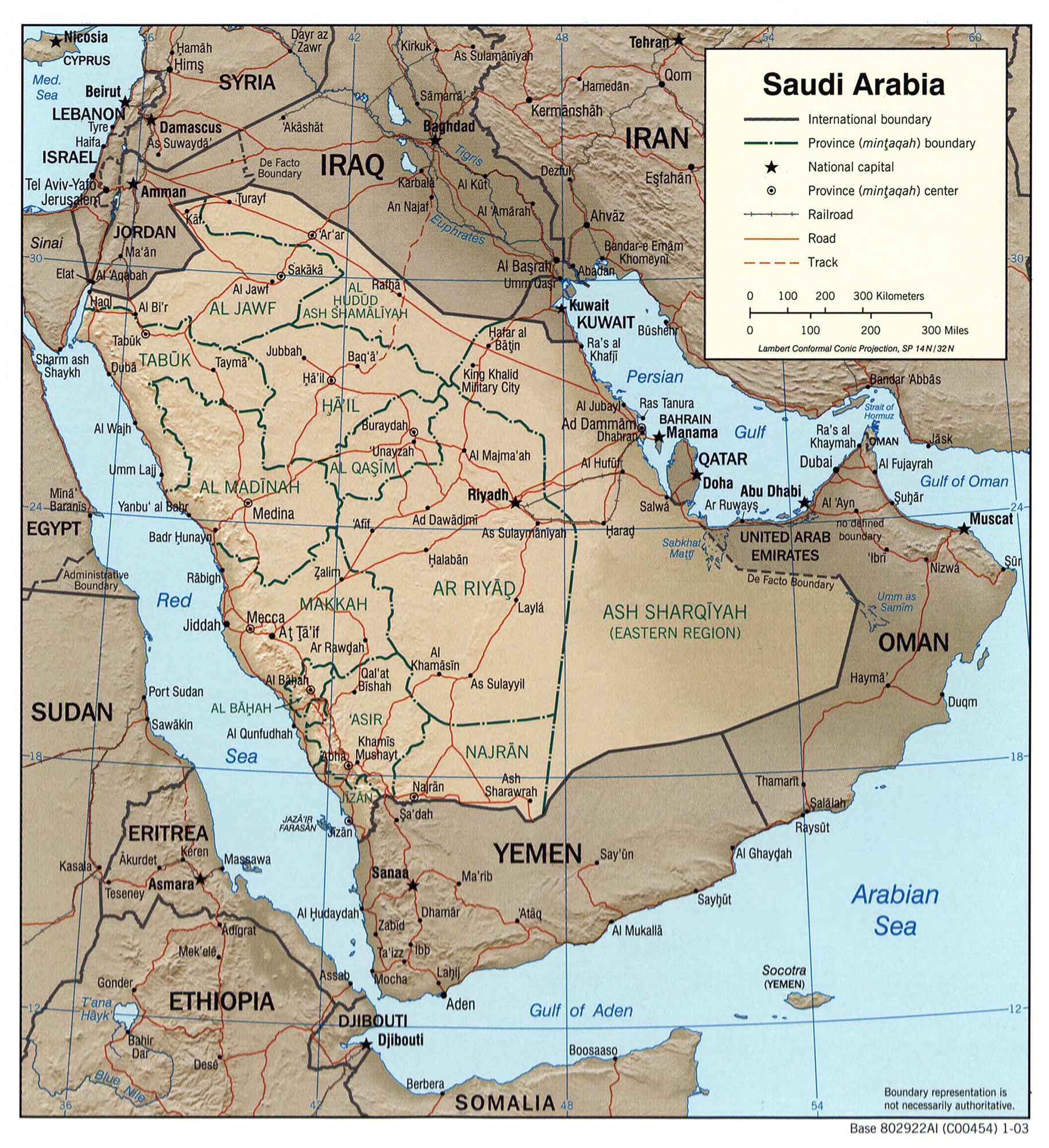
Map of Saudi Arabian administrative regions and roadways

In 1980, Saudi Arabia bought out the American interests in Aramco. King Khalid died in 1982 and was succeeded by his brother, King Fahd. Fahd continued to develop close relations with the United States and increased the purchase of American and British military equipment. The vast wealth generated by oil revenues was beginning to have an even greater impact on Saudi society. It led to rapid technological (but not cultural) modernization, urbanization, mass public education, and the creation of new media. This and the presence of increasingly large numbers of foreign workers greatly affected traditional Saudi norms and values. Although there was a dramatic change in the social and economic life of the country, political power continued to be monopolized by the royal family leading to discontent among many Saudis who began to look for wider participation in government.

In the 1980s, Saudi Arabia and Kuwait spent $25 billion in support of Saddam Hussein in the Iran–Iraq War (1980–1988); however, Saudi Arabia condemned the invasion of Kuwait in 1990 and asked the United States to intervene. King Fahd allowed American and coalition troops to be stationed in Saudi Arabia. He invited the Kuwaiti government and many of its citizens to stay in Saudi Arabia, but expelled citizens of Yemen and Jordan because of their governments' support of Iraq. In 1991, Saudi Arabian forces were involved both in bombing raids on Iraq and in the land invasion that helped to liberate Kuwait, which became known as the Gulf War (1990–1991).

Saudi Arabia's relations with the West was one of the issues that led to an increase in Islamist terrorism in Saudi Arabia, as well as Islamist terrorist attacks in Western countries by Saudi nationals. Osama bin Laden was a Saudi citizen (until stripped of his citizenship in 1994) and was responsible for the 1998 U.S. embassy bombings in East Africa and the 2000 USS Cole bombing near the port of Aden, Yemen. 15 of the hijackers involved in the September 11 attacks were Saudi nationals. Many Saudis who did not support the Islamist terrorists were nevertheless deeply unhappy with the government's policies.

Islamism was not the only source of hostility to the government. Although extremely wealthy by the 21st century, Saudi Arabia's economy was near stagnant. High taxes and a growth in unemployment have contributed to discontent and have been reflected in a rise in civil unrest, and discontent with the royal family. In response, a number of limited reforms were initiated by King Fahd. In March 1992, he introduced the "Basic Law", which emphasized the duties and responsibilities of a ruler. In December 1993, the Consultative Council was inaugurated. It is composed of a chairman and 60 members—all chosen by the King. Fahd made it clear that he did not have democracy in mind, saying: "A system based on elections is not consistent with our Islamic creed, which [approves of] government by consultation [shūrā]."

In 1995, Fahd suffered a stroke, and the Crown Prince, Abdullah, became de facto regent; however, his authority was hindered by conflict with Fahd's full brothers (known, with Fahd, as the "Sudairi Seven").

=== 21st century ===
Signs of discontent included, in 2003 and 2004, a series of bombings and armed violence in Riyadh, Jeddah, Yanbu and Khobar. In February–April 2005, the first-ever nationwide municipal elections were held in Saudi Arabia. Women were not allowed to take part.

In 2005, King Fahd died and was succeeded by Abdullah, who continued the policy of minimum reform and clamping down on protests. The king introduced economic reforms aimed at reducing the country's reliance on oil revenue: limited deregulation, encouragement of foreign investment, and privatization. In February 2009, Abdullah announced a series of governmental changes to the judiciary, armed forces, and various ministries to modernize these institutions including the replacement of senior appointees in the judiciary and the Mutaween (religious police) with more moderate individuals and the appointment of the country's first female deputy minister. On 29 January 2011, hundreds of protesters gathered in Jeddah in a rare display of criticism against the city's poor infrastructure after flooding killed 11 people.

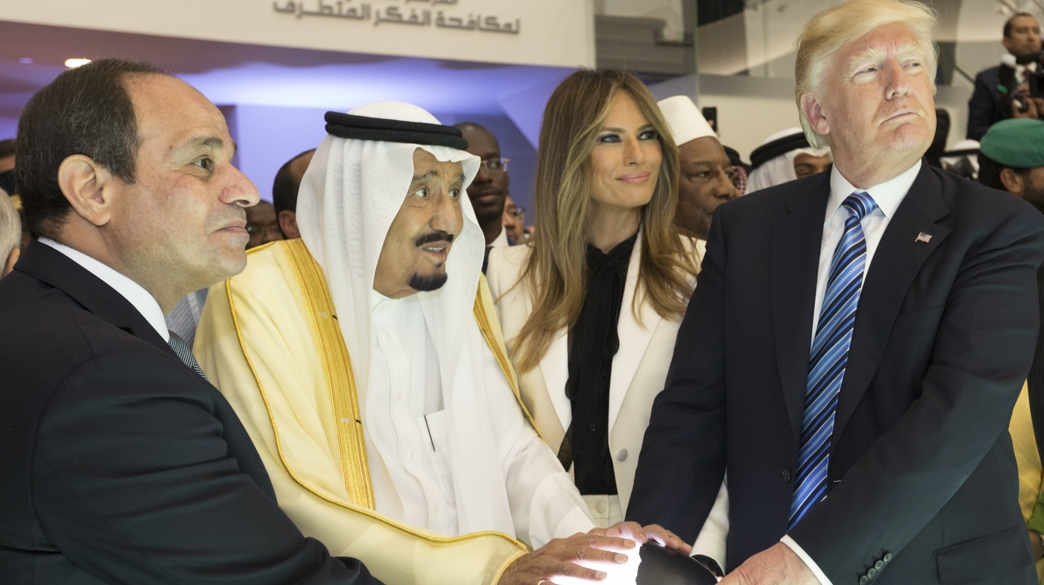
Egyptian President Abdel Fattah el-Sisi with King Salman, U.S. President Donald Trump and First Lady Melania participating in the inaugural opening of the Global Center to Combat Extremism, Sunday, May 21, 2017

Since 2011, Saudi Arabia has been affected by its own Arab Spring protests. In response, King Abdullah announced on 22 February 2011 a series of benefits for citizens amounting to $36 billion, of which $10.7 billion was earmarked for housing. No political reforms were included, though some prisoners indicted for financial crimes were pardoned. Abdullah also announced a package of $93 billion, which included 500,000 new homes to a cost of $67 billion, in addition to creating 60000 new security jobs. Although male-only municipal elections were held in 2011, Abdullah allowed women to vote and be elected in the 2015 municipal elections, and also to be nominated to the Shura Council.

== Geography ==
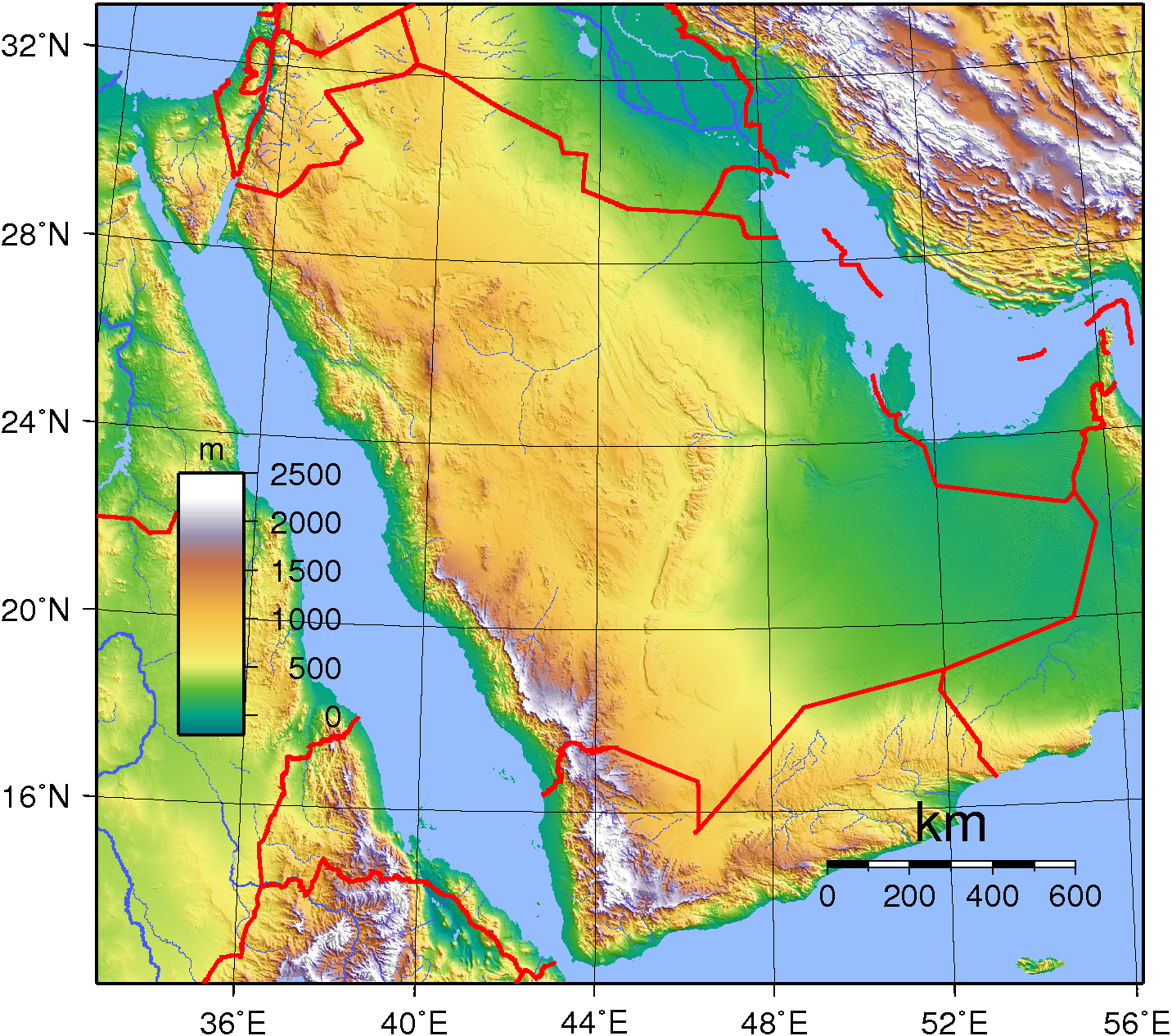
Saudi Arabia topography

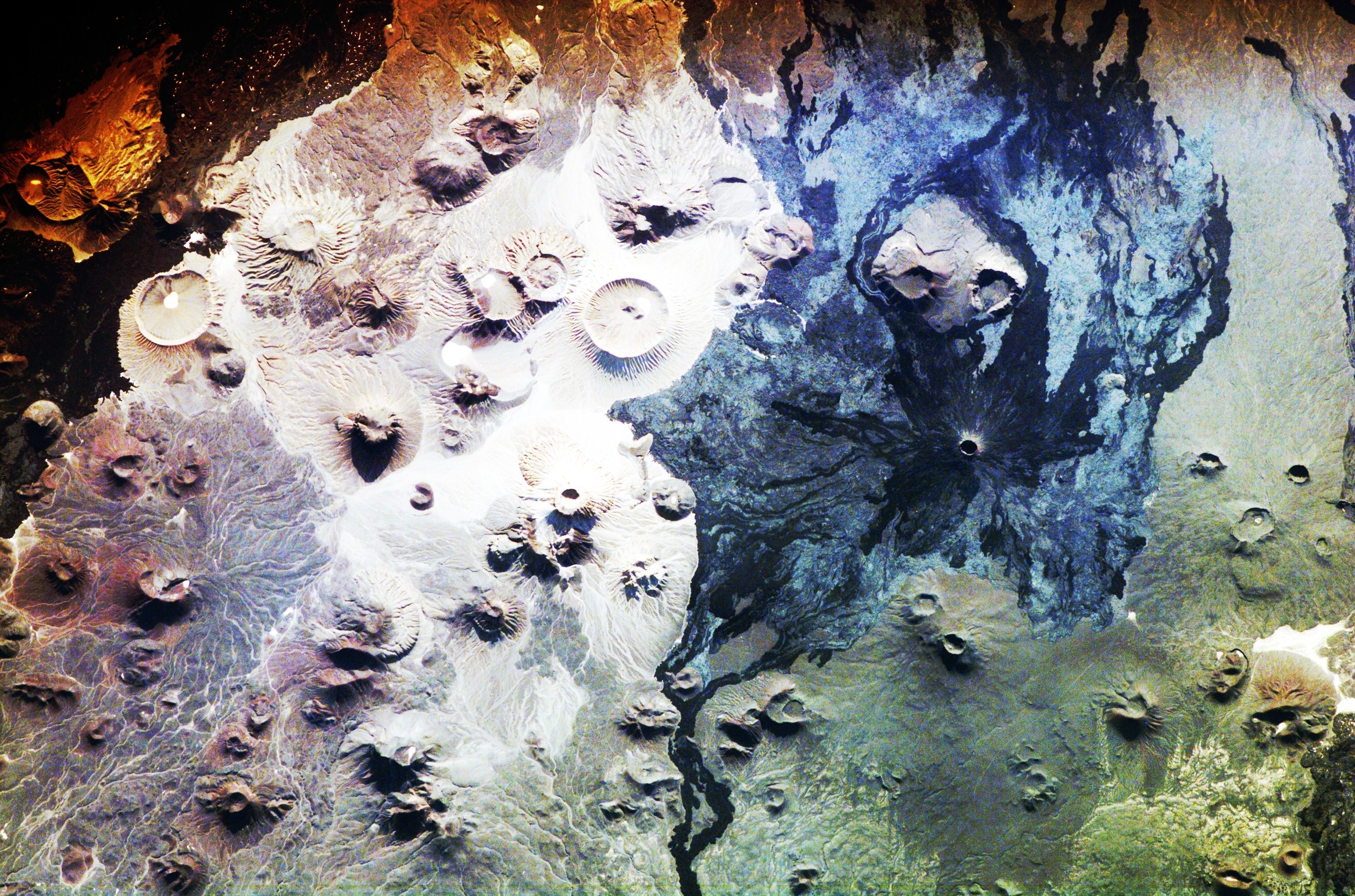
Harrat Khaybar seen from the International Space Station. Saudi Arabia is home to more than 2000 dormant volcanoes. Lava fields in Hejaz, known locally by their Arabic name of harrat (the singular is harrah), form one of Earth's largest alkali basalt regions, covering some 180,000 square kilometres (69,000 sq mi).

Saudi Arabia occupies about 80% of the Arabian Peninsula (the world's largest peninsula), lying between latitudes 16° and 33° N, and longitudes 34° and 56° E. Because the country's southeastern and southern borders with the United Arab Emirates and Oman are not precisely marked, the exact size of the country is undefined. The United Nations Statistics Division estimates 2149690 km^{2} (830000 sq mi) and lists Saudi Arabia as the world's 12th largest state. It is geographically the largest country in the Middle East and on the Arabian Plate.

Saudi Arabia's geography is dominated by the Arabian Desert, associated semi-desert, shrubland, steppes, several mountain ranges, volcanic lava fields and highlands. The 647500 km^{2} (250001 sq mi) Rub' al Khali ("Empty Quarter") in the southeastern part of the country is the world's largest contiguous sand desert. Saudi Arabia is the largest country in the world without permanent rivers. The nation features several endorheic lakes, but its hydrology relies primarily on ephemeral watercourses known as wadis, which are numerous throughout the kingdom. The fertile areas are to be found in the alluvial deposits in wadis, basins, and oases. There are approximately 1,300 islands in the Red Sea and Persian Gulf.

The main topographical feature is the central plateau which rises abruptly from the Red Sea and gradually descends into the Nejd and toward the Persian Gulf. On the Red Sea coast, there is a narrow coastal plain, known as the Tihamah, parallel to which runs along an imposing escarpment. The southwest province of Aseer is mountainous and contains the 3015 m (9892 ft) Jabal Soudah, which is the highest point in the country. Saudi Arabia is home to more than 2,000 dormant volcanoes. Lava fields in Hejaz, known locally by their Arabic name of harrat (the singular is harrah), form one of Earth's largest alkali basalt regions, covering some 180,000 square kilometres (69,000 sq mi).

Except for the southwestern regions such as Aseer, Saudi Arabia has a desert climate with very high day-time temperatures during the summer and a sharp temperature drop at night. Average summer temperatures are around 45 °C (113 °F) but can be as high as 54 °C (129 °F). In the winter the temperature rarely drops below 0 °C (32 °F) with the exception of mostly the northern regions of the country where annual snowfall, in particular in the mountainous regions of Tabuk Province, is not uncommon. The lowest recorded temperature, −12.0 °C (10.4 °F), was measured in Turaif. Of the Gulf states, Saudi Arabia is likely to experience snowfalls most frequently.

In the spring and autumn the heat is temperate, temperatures average around 29 °C (84 °F). Annual rainfall is very low. The southern regions differ in that they are influenced by the Indian Ocean monsoons, usually occurring between October and March. An average of 300 mm (12 in) of rainfall occurs during this period, which is about 60% of the annual precipitation.

=== Biodiversity ===
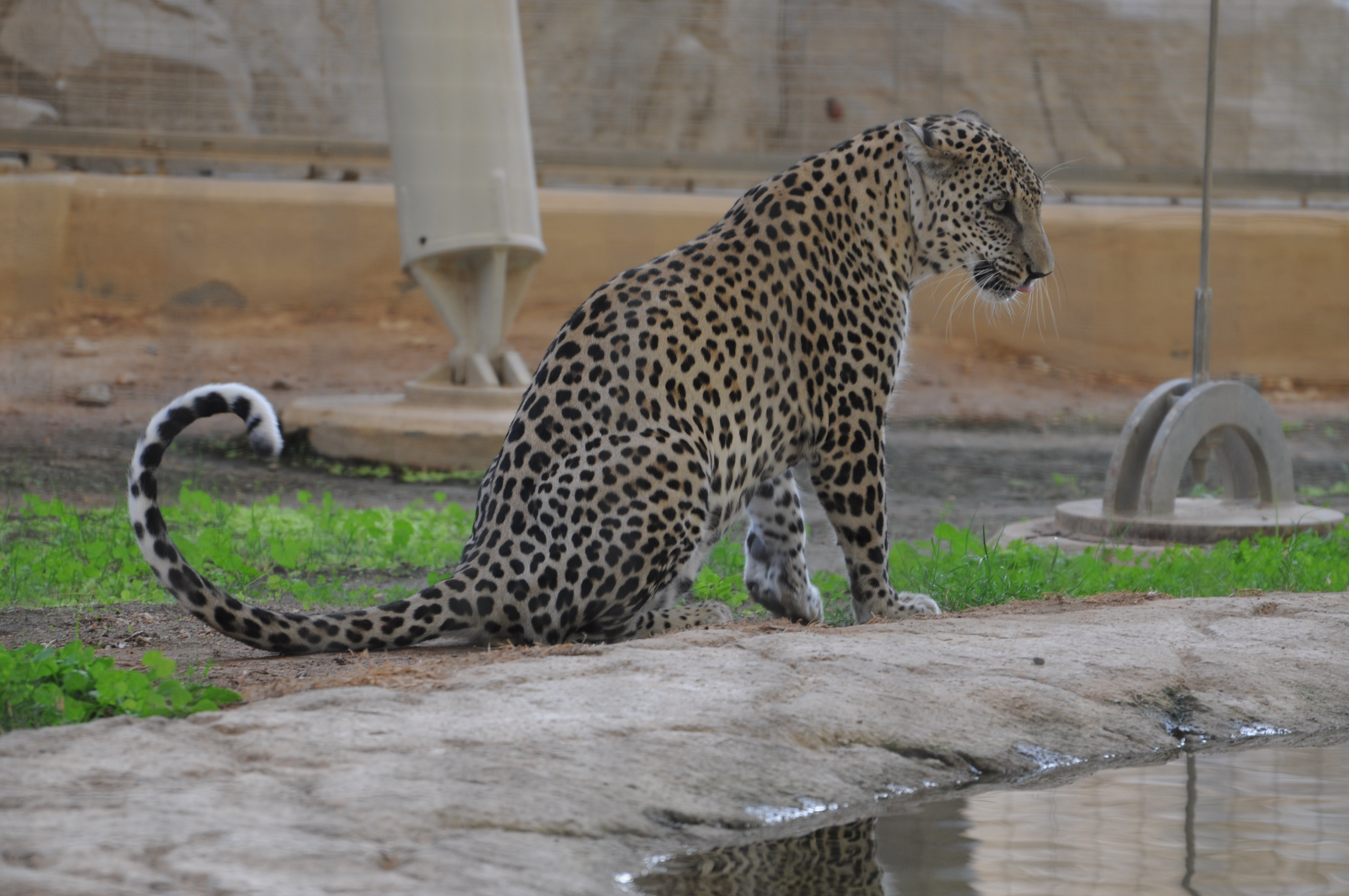
The critically endangered Arabian leopard

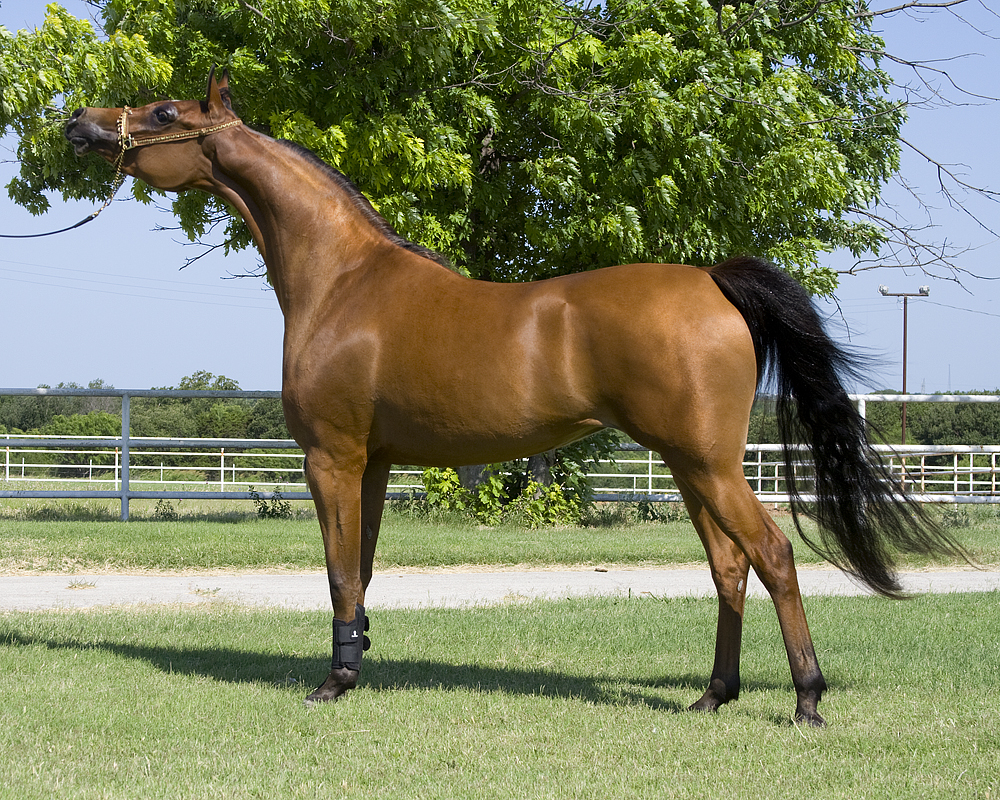
The Arabian horse is native to Arabia, and an important element of traditional Arabian folklore.

Saudi Arabia is home to five terrestrial ecoregions: Arabian Peninsula coastal fog desert, Southwestern Arabian foothills savanna, Southwestern Arabian montane woodlands, Arabian Desert, and Red Sea Nubo-Sindian tropical desert and semi-desert. Wildlife includes the Arabian leopard, Arabian wolf, striped hyena, mongoose, baboon, Cape hare, sand cat, and jerboa. Animals such as gazelles, oryx, leopards and cheetahs were relatively numerous until the 19th century, when extensive hunting reduced these animals almost to extinction. The culturally important Asiatic lion occurred in Saudi Arabia until the late 19th century before it was hunted to extinction in the wild. Birds include falcons (which are caught and trained for hunting), eagles, hawks, vultures, sandgrouse, and bulbuls. There are several species of snakes, many of which are venomous. Domesticated animals include the legendary Arabian horse, Arabian camel, sheep, goats, cattle, donkeys, chickens, etc.

The Red Sea is a rich and diverse ecosystem with more than 1,200 species of fish around 10% of which are endemic. This also includes 42 species of deep water fish. The rich diversity is partly owed to the 2000 km (1240 mi) of coral reef extending along the coastline; these fringing reefs are largely formed of stony acropora and porites corals. The reefs form platforms and sometimes lagoons along the coast and occasional other features such as cylinders (such as the Blue Hole at Dahab). These coastal reefs are also visited by pelagic species, including some of the 44 species of shark. There are many offshore reefs including several atolls. Many of the unusual offshore reef formations defy classic (i.e., Darwinian) coral reef classification schemes and are generally attributed to the high levels of tectonic activity that characterize the area.

Reflecting the country's dominant desert conditions, plant life mostly consists of herbs, plants, and shrubs that require little water. The date palm (Phoenix dactylifera) is widespread, and is a national symbol.

== Government and politics ==
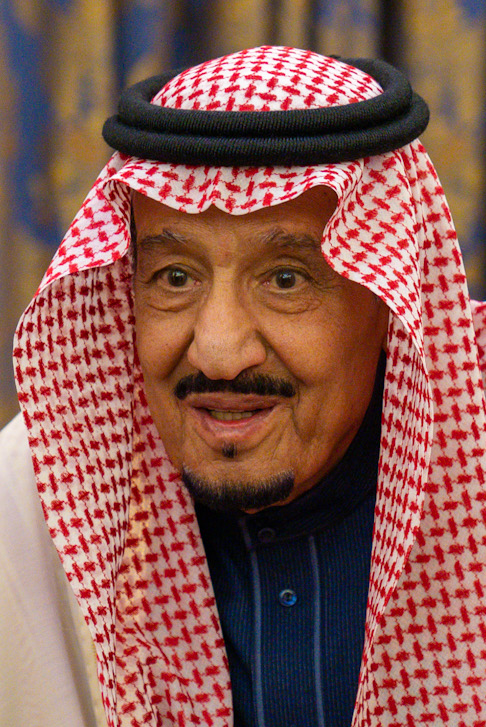
Salman bin Abdulaziz Al Saud
King

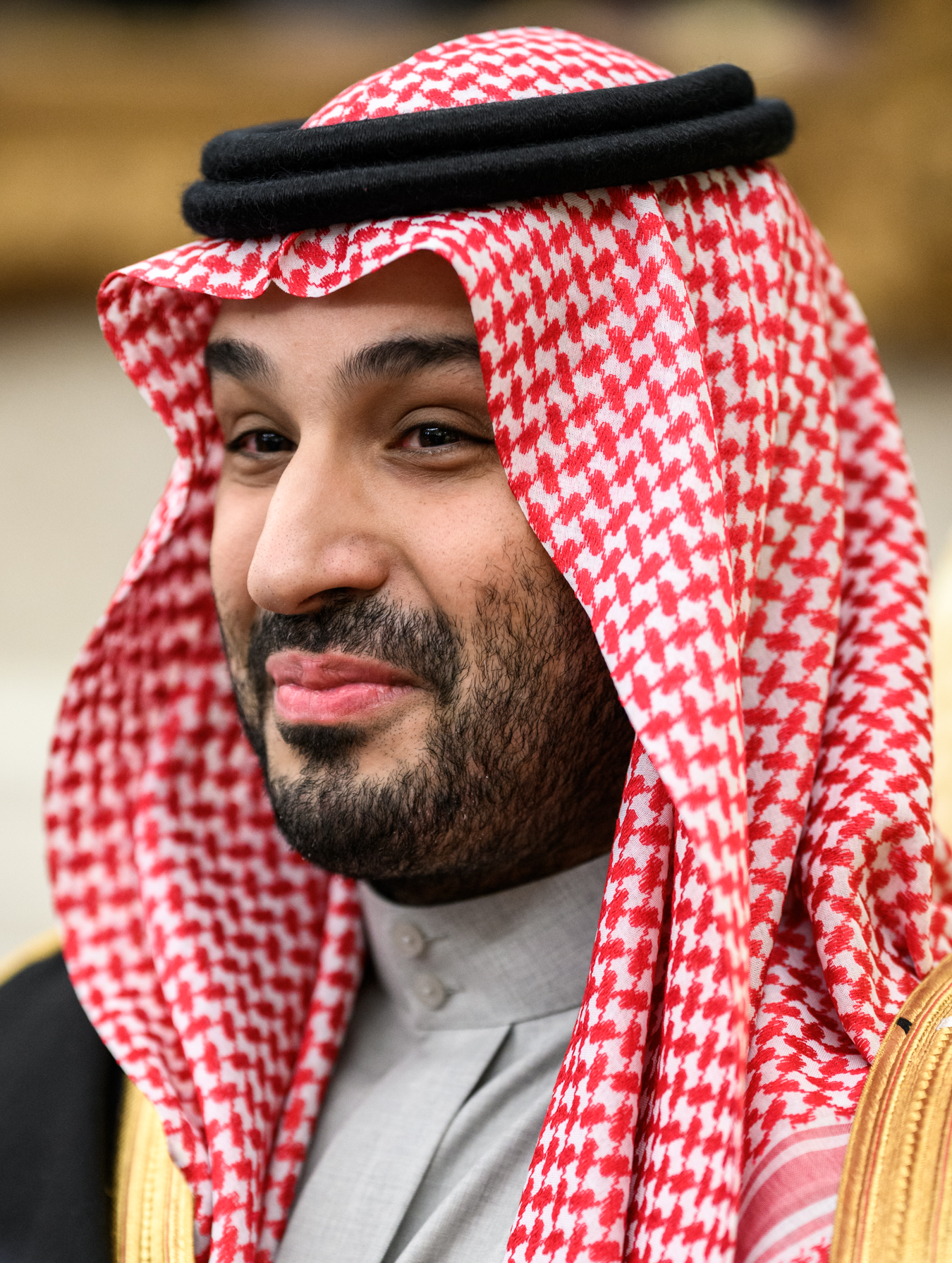
Mohammed bin Salman
Crown Prince and Prime Minister

Saudi Arabia is an absolute monarchy; however, according to the Basic Law of Saudi Arabia adopted by royal decree in 1992, the king must comply with Sharia (Islamic law) and the Quran, while the Quran and the Sunnah (the traditions of Muhammad) are declared to be the country's constitution. No political parties or national elections are permitted. While some critics consider it to be a totalitarian state, others regard it as lacking aspects of totalitarianism but nevertheless classify it as an authoritarian regime. The Economist ranked the Saudi government 150th out of 167 in its 2022 Democracy Index, and Freedom House gave it its lowest "Not Free" rating, giving it a score of 8 out of 100 for 2023. In the V-Dem Democracy Indices, Saudi Arabia ranks amongst the lowest as a "closed autocracy," ranking at 179th and 167th out of 179 countries in electoral democracy and liberal democracy indices respectively. Additionally, according to International IDEA's Global State of Democracy (GSoD) Indices and Democracy Tracker, Saudi Arabia performs in the low range on overall democratic measures, with particular weaknesses in political representation, including credible elections, inclusive suffrage and effective parliament.

In the absence of national elections and political parties, politics in Saudi Arabia takes place in two distinct arenas: within the royal family, the Al Saud, and between the royal family and the rest of Saudi society. Participation in the political process is limited to a relatively small segment of the population and takes the form of the royal family consulting with the ulema, tribal sheikhs, and business elite on major decisions. This process is not reported by the Saudi media.

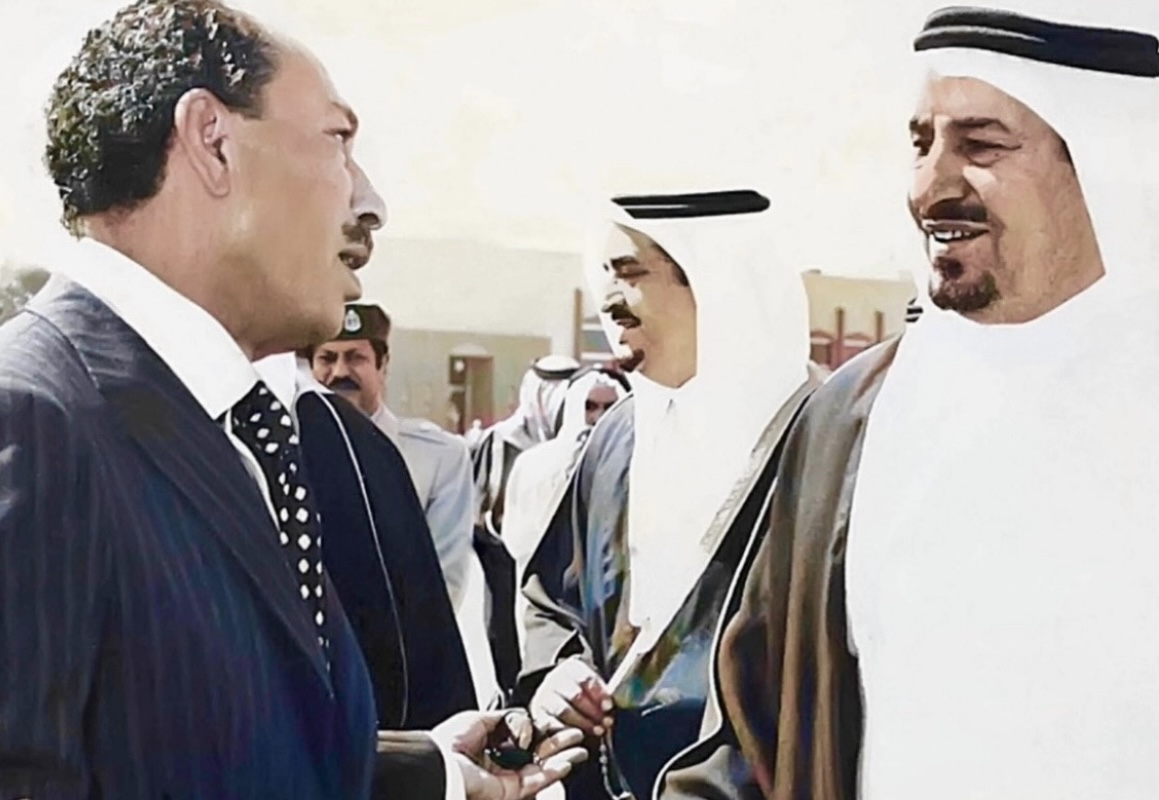
King Khalid (right) meeting Egypt's president Anwar Sadat with crown prince Fahd in the background at Cairo Airport in 1975

By custom, all males of full age have a right to petition the king directly through the traditional tribal meeting known as the majlis. In many ways the approach to government differs little from the traditional system of tribal rule. Tribal identity remains strong, and outside of the royal family, political influence is frequently determined by tribal affiliation. Tribal sheikhs continue to exert a considerable degree of influence over local and national events. In recent years there have been limited steps to widen political participation such as the establishment of the Consultative Council in the early 1990s and the National Dialogue Forum in 2003. In 2005, the first municipal elections were held. In 2007, the Allegiance Council was created to regulate the succession. In 2009, the king made significant personnel changes to the government by appointing reformers to key positions and the first woman to a ministerial post; however, these changes have been criticized as being too slow or merely cosmetic.

The rule of the Al Saud faces political opposition from four sources: Sunni Islamist activism; liberal critics; the Shi'ite minority—particularly in the Eastern Province; and long-standing tribal/regionalist opponents (for example in the Hejaz). Of these, the minority activists have been the most prominent threat to the government and have in recent years been involved in violent incidents in the country. However, open protest against the government, even if peaceful, is not tolerated.

=== Monarchy and royal family ===
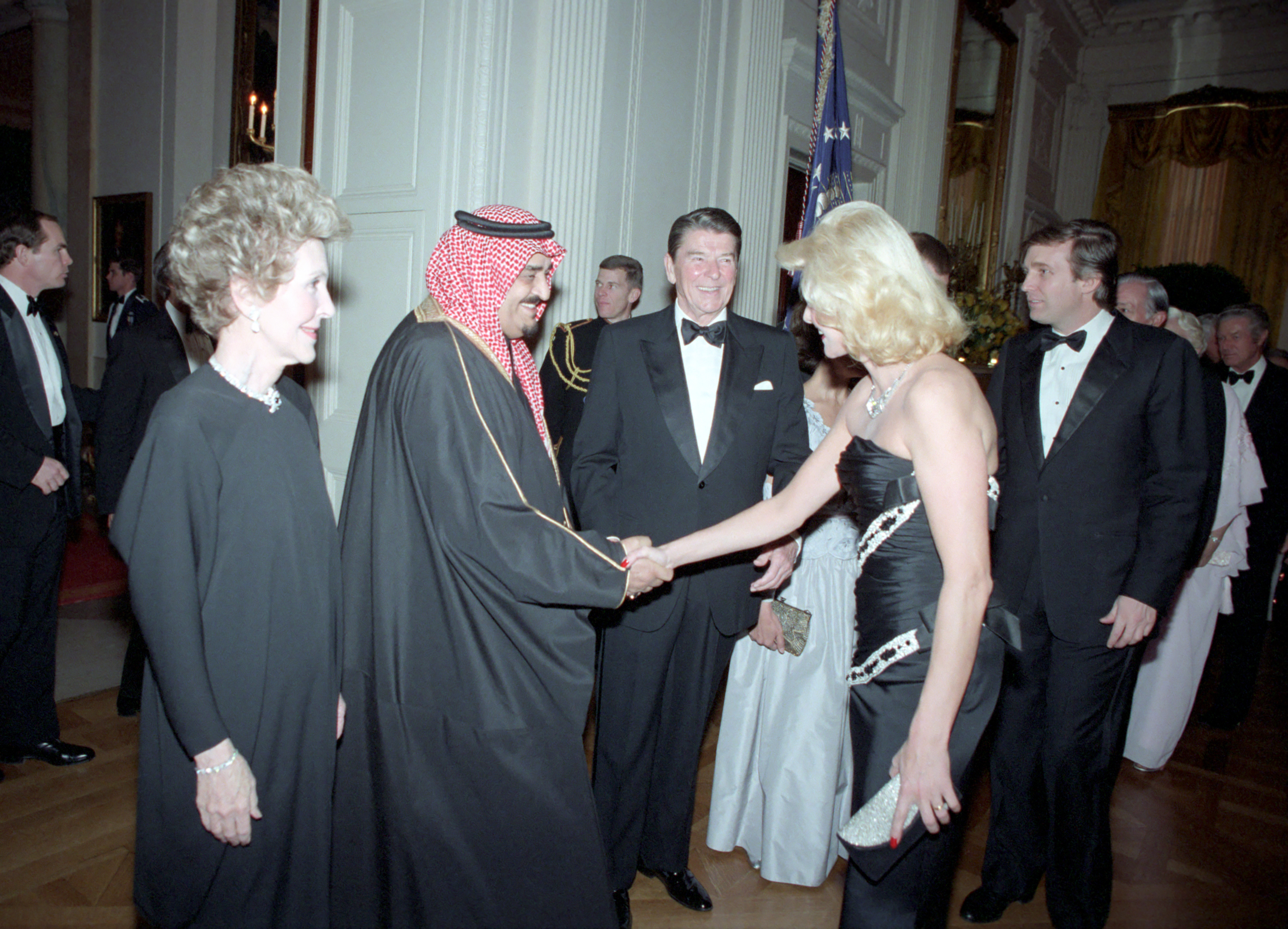
King Fahd with US President Ronald Reagan and future US President Donald Trump in 1985. The US and Saudi Arabia supplied money and arms to the anti-Soviet mujahideen fighters in Afghanistan.

The king combines legislative, executive, and judicial functions, with royal decrees forming the basis of the country's legislation. The prime minister presides over the Council of Ministers of Saudi Arabia and Consultative Assembly of Saudi Arabia. The king has usually been also the prime minister, with two exceptions: Crown Prince Faisal, who was prime minister during the reign of King Saud, and Crown Prince Mohammed Bin Salman, the current prime minister since 2022. The royal family dominates the political system. The family's vast numbers allows it to control most of the kingdom's important posts and to have an involvement at all levels of government. It is estimated there are at least 7000 princes, with most power and influence being wielded by the 200 or so male descendants of Ibn Saud. The key ministries are generally reserved for the royal family, as are the 13 regional governorships.

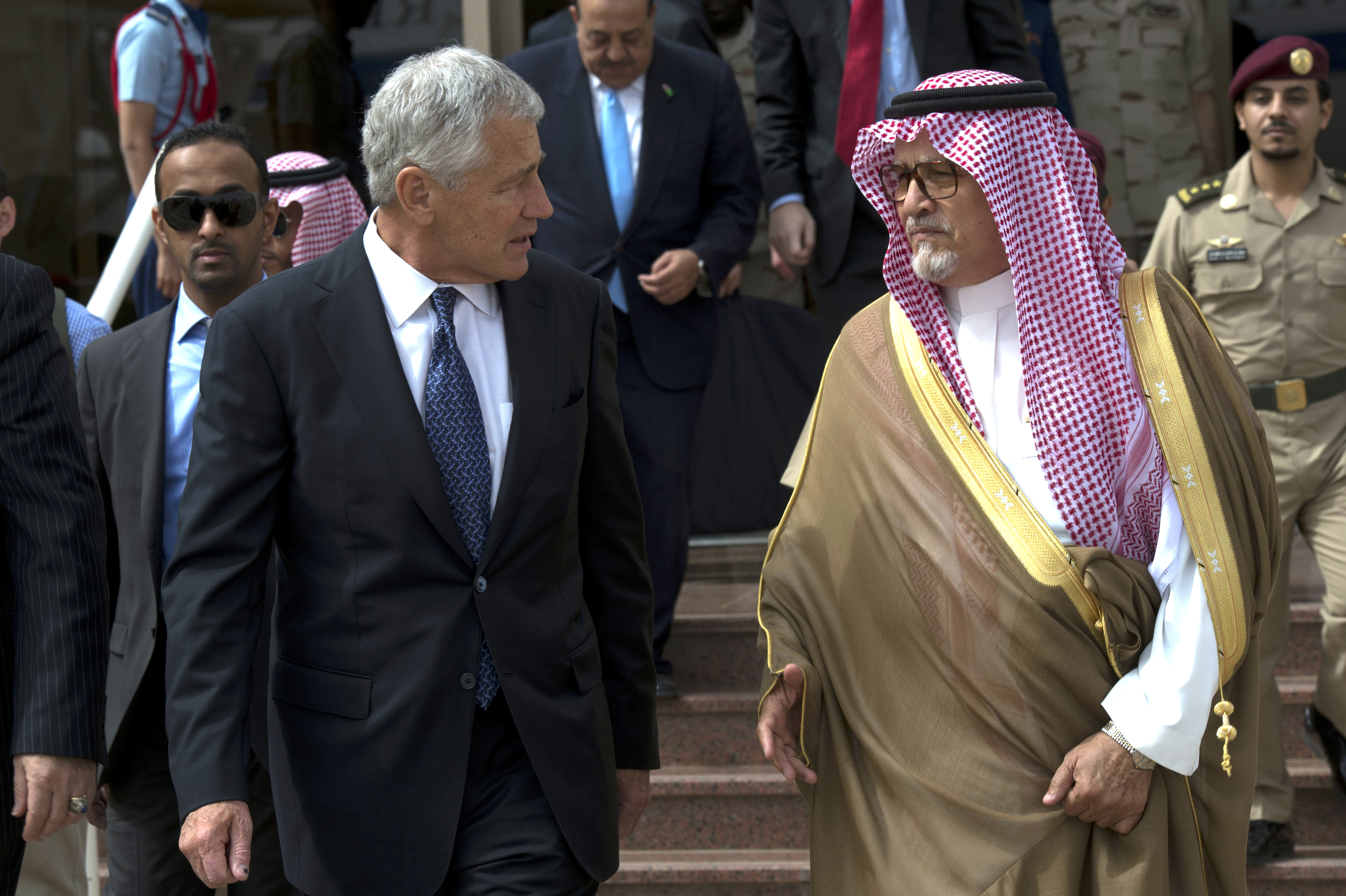
As many as 500 princes, government ministers, and business people, including Prince Fahd bin Abdullah, were arrested by Saudi Arabian authorities as part of the 2017 Saudi Arabian purge.

The Saudi government and the royal family have often been accused of corruption over many years, and this continues into the 21st century. In a country that is said to "belong" to the royal family and is named for them, the lines between state assets and the personal wealth of senior princes are blurred. The extent of corruption has been described as systemic and endemic, and its existence was acknowledged and defended by Prince Bandar bin Sultan (a senior member of the royal family) in an interview in 2001.

In its Corruption Perceptions Index for 2010, Transparency International gave Saudi Arabia a score of 4.7 (on a scale from 0 to 10 where 0 is "highly corrupt" and 10 is "highly clean"). Saudi Arabia has undergone a process of political and social reform, such as to increase public transparency and good governance, but nepotism and patronage are widespread when doing business in the country; the enforcement of the anti-corruption laws is selective and public officials engage in corruption with impunity. As many as 500 people, including prominent Saudi Arabian princes, government ministers, and businesspeople, were arrested in an anti-corruption campaign in November 2017.

=== Al ash-Sheikh and role of the ulema ===
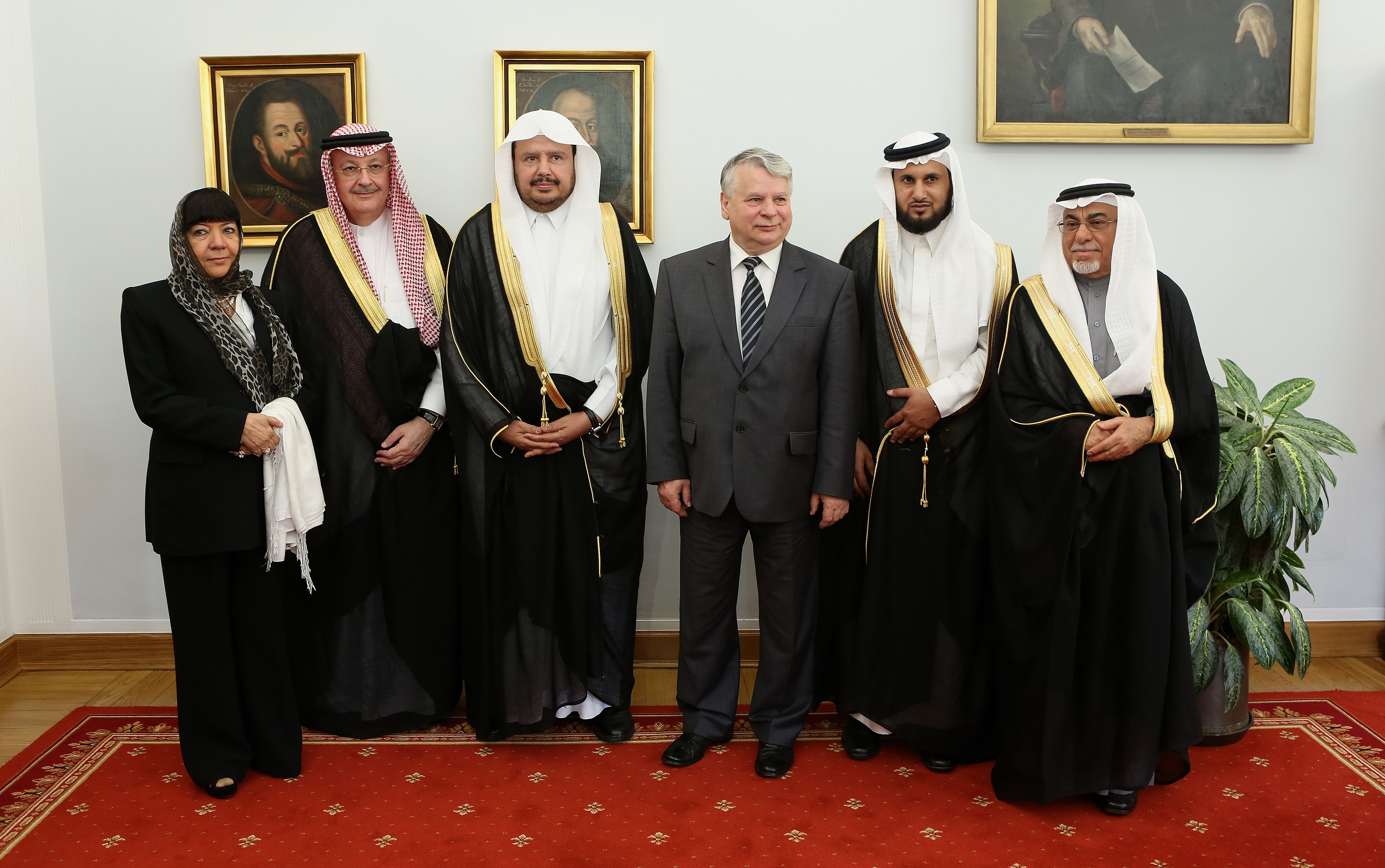
Abdullah ibn Muhammad Al ash-Sheikh with Bogdan Borusewicz in the Polish Senate, 26 May 2014

Saudi Arabia is unique in giving the ulema (the body of Islamic religious leaders and jurists) a direct role in government. The preferred ulema are of the Salafi movement. The ulema have been a key influence in major government decisions, for example the imposition of the oil embargo in 1973 and the invitation to foreign troops to Saudi Arabia in 1990. In addition, they have had a major role in the judicial and education systems as well as a monopoly of authority over socio-religious affairs.

By the 1970s, as a result of oil wealth and the modernization initiated by King Faisal, important changes to Saudi society were underway, and the power of the ulema was in decline. However, this changed following the seizure of the Grand Mosque in Mecca in 1979 by Islamist radicals. The government's response to the crisis included strengthening the ulema's powers and increasing their financial support: in particular, they were given greater control over the education system and were allowed to enforce the stricter observance of Wahhabi rules of moral and social behaviour. After his accession to the throne in 2005, King Abdullah took steps to reduce the powers of the ulema, for instance transferring control over girls' education to the Ministry of Education.

The ulema have historically been led by the Al ash-Sheikh, the country's leading religious family. The Al ash-Sheikh are the descendants of Muhammad ibn Abd al-Wahhab, the 18th-century founder of Wahhabism which dominates Saudi society. The family is second in prestige only to the Al Saud (the royal family) with whom they formed a "mutual support pact" and power-sharing arrangement nearly 300 years ago. The pact, which persists to this day, is based on the Al Saud maintaining the Al ash-Sheikh's authority in religious matters while upholding and propagating Wahhabi doctrine. In return, the Al ash-Sheikh support the Al Saud's political authority thereby using its religious-moral authority to legitimize the royal family's rule. Although the Al ash-Sheikh's domination of the ulema has diminished in recent decades, they still hold the most important religious posts and are closely linked to the Al Saud by a high degree of intermarriage.

=== Legal system ===
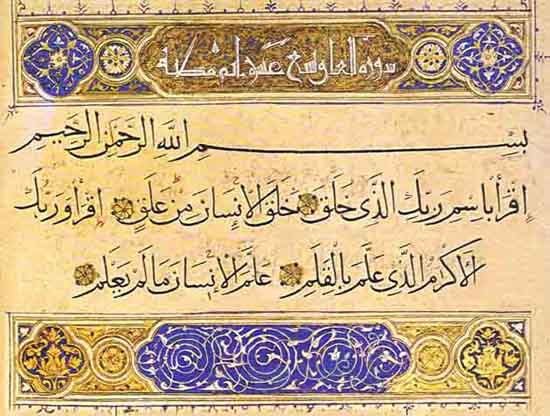
Verses from the Quran. The Quran is the official constitution of the country and a primary source of law. Saudi Arabia is unique in enshrining a religious text as a political document.

The primary source of law is the Islamic Sharia derived from the teachings of the Quran and the Sunnah (the traditions of Muhammad). Saudi Arabia is unique among modern Muslim states in that Sharia is not codified and there is no system of judicial precedent, allowing judges to use independent legal reasoning to make a decision. Thus, divergent judgments arise even in apparently identical cases, making predictability of legal interpretation difficult. Saudi judges tend to follow the principles of the Hanbali school of jurisprudence (fiqh) found in pre-modern texts and noted for its literalist interpretation of the Qur'an and hadith. In 2021, Saudi Arabia announced judicial reforms to entirely codify its laws and eliminate discrepancies.

Royal decrees are the other main source of law but are referred to as regulations rather than laws because they are subordinate to Sharia. Royal decrees supplement Sharia in areas such as labour, commercial and corporate law. Additionally, traditional tribal law and custom remain significant. Extra-Sharia government tribunals usually handle disputes relating to specific royal decrees. Final appeal from both Sharia courts and government tribunals is to the king, and all courts and tribunals follow Sharia rules of evidence and procedure.

Retaliatory punishments, or Qisas, are practised: for instance, an eye can be surgically removed at the insistence of a victim who lost his own eye. Families of someone unlawfully killed can choose between demanding the death penalty or granting clemency in return for a payment of diyya (blood money) by the perpetrator.

=== Administrative divisions ===
Saudi Arabia is divided into 13 regions (Arabic: مناطق إدارية; manatiq idāriyya, sing. منطقة إدارية; mintaqah idariyya). The regions are further divided into 118 governorates (Arabic: محافظات; muhafazat, sing. محافظة; muhafazah). This number includes the 13 regional capitals, which have a different status as municipalities (Arabic: أمانة; amanah) headed by mayors (Arabic: أمين; amin). The governorates are further subdivided into sub-governorates (Arabic: مراكز; marakiz, sing. مركز; markaz).

=== Foreign relations ===
The foreign policy of Saudi Arabia is officially focused on cooperation with the oil-exporting Gulf States, the unity of the Arab world, Islamic solidarity, and support for the United Nations and multilateralism. It joined the UN in 1945 and is a founding member of the Arab League, Gulf Cooperation Council, Muslim World League, and the Organisation of Islamic Cooperation. (Note: Formerly the Organisation of the Islamic Conference.) Saudi Arabia joined the World Trade Organization in 2005 and plays a prominent role in the International Monetary Fund, the World Bank, and the G20. Although part of the Non-Aligned Movement, Saudi Arabia is generally considered pro-Western.

Since co-founding OPEC in 1960, Saudi Arabia's oil pricing policy has officially aimed to stabilize the world oil market and moderate sharp price movements so as not to jeopardize Western economies. In 1973, Saudi Arabia and other Arab nations imposed an oil embargo against the United States, United Kingdom, Japan, and other Western nations that supported Israel in the Yom Kippur War. The embargo caused an oil crisis with many short- and long-term effects on global politics and the global economy.

Saudi Arabia and the United States are strategic allies; the U.S. has been the most influential foreign power in the kingdom since the end of World War II. Saudi Arabia's role in the 1991 Gulf War, particularly the stationing of American troops on Saudi soil from 1991, prompted the development of a hostile Islamist response internally. As a result, Saudi Arabia has, to some extent, distanced itself from the U.S.; for example, it refused to support or participate in the U.S.-led invasion of Iraq in 2003. Nevertheless, Saudi Arabia remains a key strategic ally of the U.S. and a leading importer of American arms. In 2017, American President Donald Trump and King Salman signed a series of letters of intent for Saudi Arabia to purchase arms from the United States totalling $350 billion over 10 years.

Since Crown Prince Mohammed bin Salman took power in 2017, Saudi Arabia has pursued closer ties with both China and Russia as a balancing move away from its traditional reliance on the United States. This has involved an increase in both economic and political cooperation, such as elevating Sino-Saudi relations to that of a comprehensive strategic partnership as well as forming an agreement with Russia to reduce oil production among OPEC nations during the Ukraine War.

Saudi Arabia has traditionally sought to preserve the regional status quo by using its financial, diplomatic, and military resources to limit the effects of revolutionary uprisings in neighbouring countries. It has engaged in a proxy conflict with Iran since the 1979 Islamic Revolution, which had called for the overthrow of monarchies and Sunni dominance. The rivalry between Iran and Saudi Arabia can be seen as the geopolitical extension of the wider Sunni-Shia conflict, with both sides being the flagship state for their respective sides. The consequences of the 2003 invasion of Iraq and the Arab Spring (2010–2012) led to increasing alarm within the Saudi monarchy over the rise of Iran's influence in the region. These fears were reflected in comments of King Abdullah, who privately urged the United States to attack Iran and "cut off the head of the snake". However, tensions between the rivals have cooled in recent years due to diplomatic dialogue. Despite being allies with The UAE on several organizations, they have been locked in a proxy war over the Yemeni civil war (2014–present) in which the Emiratis have supported secessionists against the pro-Saudi central government.

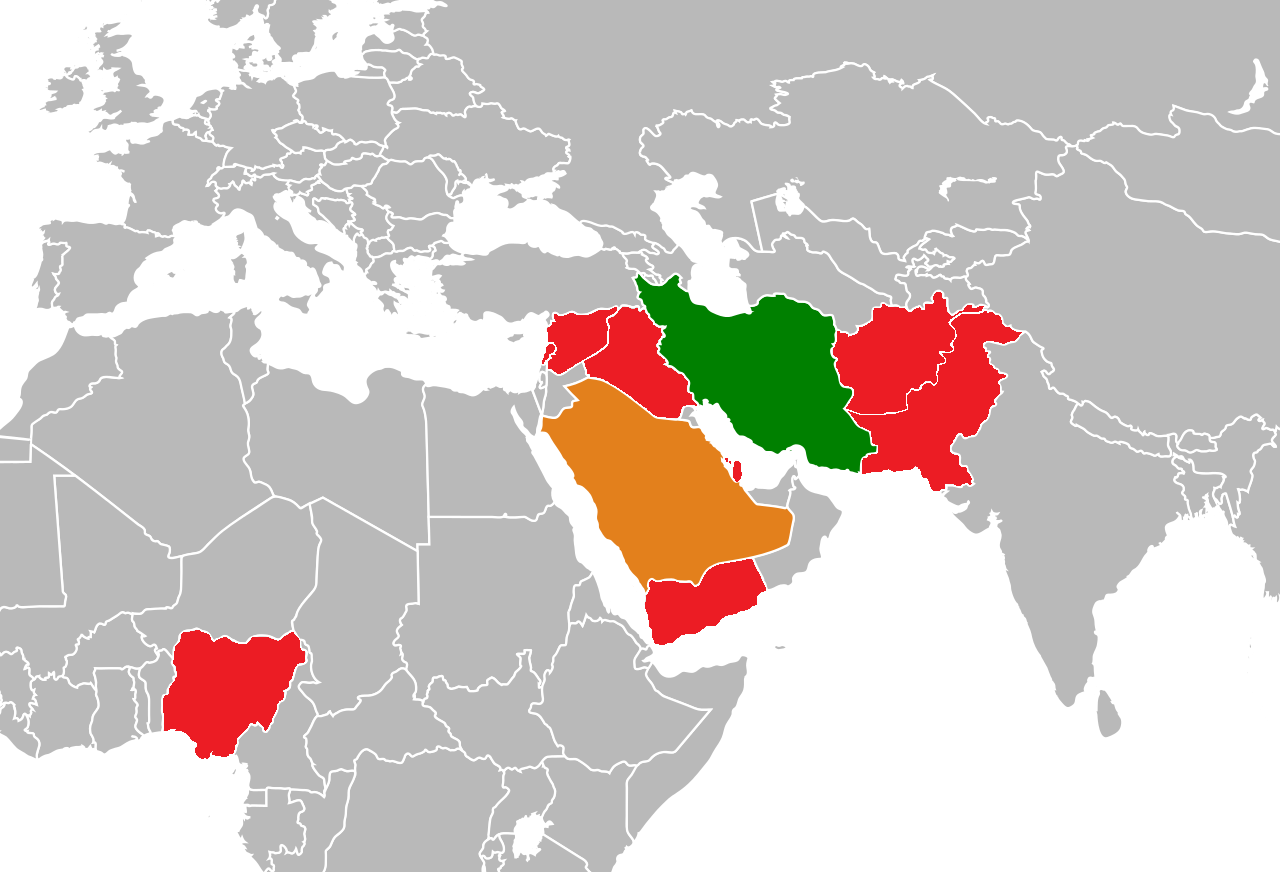
Major Iran–Saudi Arabia proxy conflict locations Iran shown in green, KSA shown in orange

Saudi Arabia has been seen as a moderating influence in the Arab–Israeli conflict, periodically putting forward a peace plan between Israel and the Palestinians and condemning Hezbollah.

In 2017, as part of its nuclear power programme, Saudi Arabia planned to extract uranium domestically, taking a step towards self-sufficiency in producing nuclear fuel. Subsequently, the kingdom has been exploring foreign partnerships for constructing its first civil nuclear reactors, including with the United States, China, Russia, South Korea, and France.

Saudi Arabia has sought to build greater relations with other Asian countries as well, particularly India, Pakistan, South Korea, Indonesia and Bangladesh. Saudi Arabia sees South Korea as a key business partner in multiple core sectors and has signed a mutual defence agreement with Pakistan. Despite having close relations with Pakistan for decades, India has emerged as another key economic partner with Saudi Arabia.

==== Allegations of sponsoring global terrorism ====
Saudi Arabia has been accused of sponsoring Islamic terrorism. According to former Iraqi Prime Minister Nouri al-Maliki in March 2014, Saudi Arabia along with Qatar provided political, financial, and media support to terrorists against the Iraqi government. Similarly, former President of Syria Bashar al-Assad noted in 2015 that the sources of the extreme ideology of the terrorist organization ISIS and other such Salafist extremist groups are the Wahabism that has been supported by the royal family of Saudi Arabia.

Relations with the U.S. became strained following 9/11 terror attacks. American politicians and media accused the Saudi government of supporting terrorism and tolerating a jihadist culture. According to former U.S. Secretary of State Hillary Clinton in December 2010, "Saudi Arabia remains a critical financial support base for al-Qaida, the Taliban, LeT and other terrorist groups... Donors in Saudi Arabia constitute the most significant source of funding to Sunni terrorist groups worldwide." The Saudi government denies these claims or that it exports religious or cultural extremism. In September 2016, the U.S. Congress passed the Justice Against Sponsors of Terrorism Act that would allow relatives of victims of the 11 September attacks to sue Saudi Arabia for its government's alleged role in the attacks. In 2014, Sheikh Abdulaziz bin Abdullah Al-Sheikh, the Grand Mufti of Saudi Arabia and Chairman of the Council of Senior Scholars, issued a fatwa explicitly prohibiting joining or supporting terrorist organizations such as ISIS and al-Qaeda. According to the U.S. Department of State, "Saudi Arabia plays an important role in working toward a peaceful and prosperous future for the region and is a strong partner in security and counterterrorism efforts and in military, diplomatic, and financial cooperation." A significant Saudi counterterrorism success was the foiling of a 2010 cargo plane bomb plot. In December 2015, Saudi Arabia announced the formation of the Islamic Military Counter Terrorism Coalition, an alliance of Muslim-majority countries aimed at combating terrorism and extremism.

Since 2016 the kingdom has started to back off from exporting Islamic fundamentalism. Several reforms took place including curbing the powers of religious police, and no longer funding the construction of mosques abroad.

=== Military ===
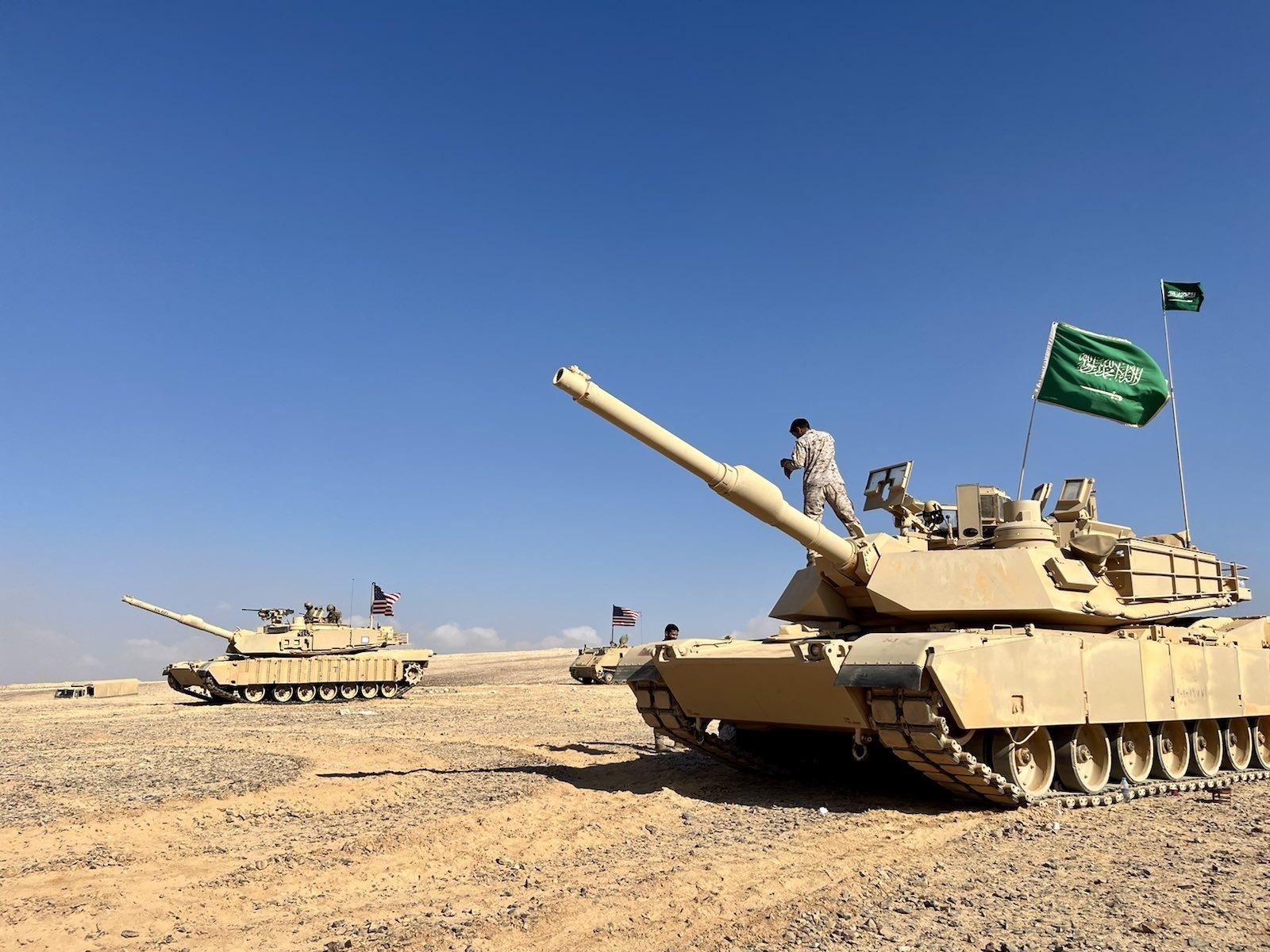
M1 Abrams of the Royal Saudi Land Forces

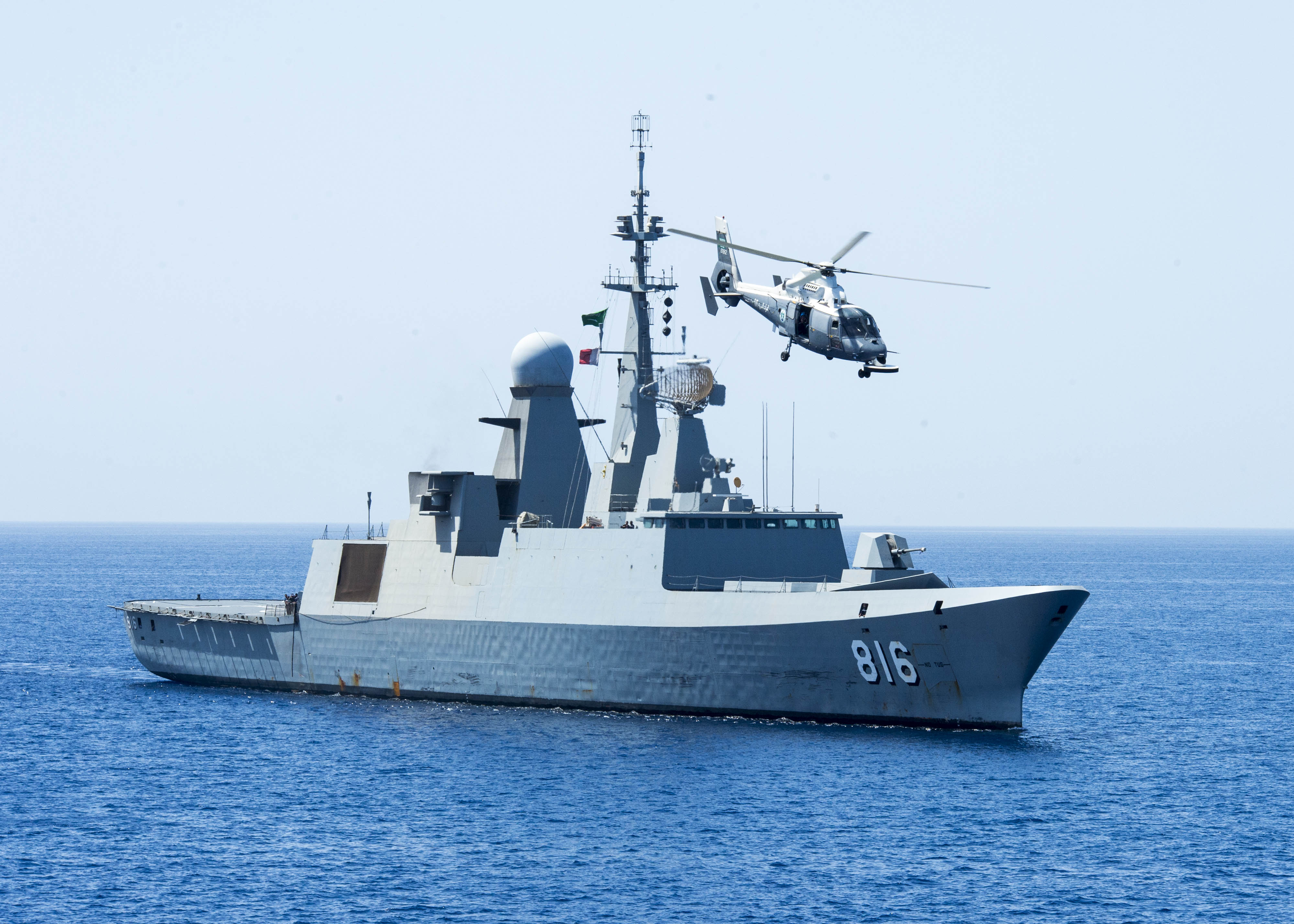
Al-Riyadh-class frigate of the Royal Saudi Navy

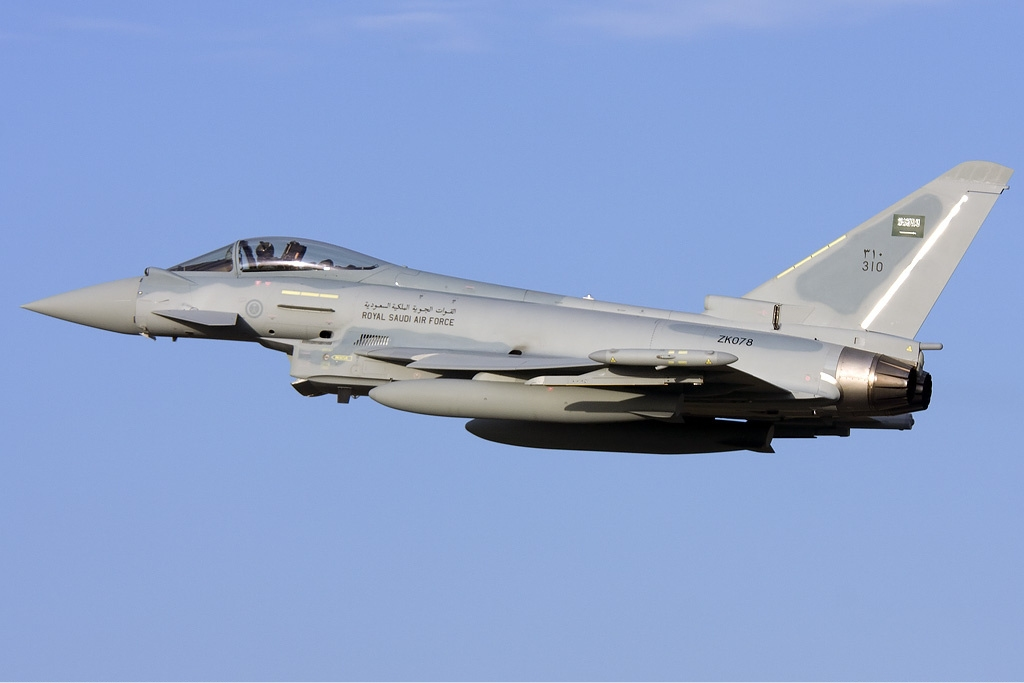
Eurofighter Typhoon of the Royal Saudi Air Force

The Armed Forces of Saudi Arabia are under the Ministry of Defence and consist of the Royal Saudi Land Forces (including the Royal Guard), the Air Force, the Navy, the Air Defence, and the Strategic Missile Force; the Saudi Arabian National Guard, which is under the Ministry of National Guard, is made up of tribal forces loyal to the Saudi royal family and plays a role in both domestic security and foreign defence. Additionally, the kingdom has several paramilitary forces under the Minister of Interior, including the Saudi Arabian Border Guard, Facilities Security Force, and Coast Guard. The primary special operations and counterterrorism units are the Special Security Force and the Emergency Force under the Presidency of State Security, which combines all counterterrorism and intelligence services and reports directly to the king. As of 2023, there are 127,000 active personnel in the Armed Forces, 130,000 in the National Guard, and 24,500 in the paramilitary security forces.

Saudi Arabia has one of the world's highest military expenditures in both proportional and absolute terms, at approximately US$80.3 billion (roughly 7% of GDP) according to a 2024 estimate by the Stockholm International Peace Research Institute (SIPRI); this places the country seventh in the world, behind the United States, China, Russia, Germany, India, and the United Kingdom. Spending on defence and security has increased significantly since the mid-1990s and was about US$78.4 billion as of 2019. A 2023 estimate by SIPRI ranked Saudi Arabia fourth in the world in per capita military spending. The kingdom was the world's second largest arms importer from 2019 to 2023. According to the BICC, Saudi Arabia is the 28th most militarized country in the world and possesses the second-best military equipment qualitatively in the region, after Israel. Its modern high-technology arsenal makes Saudi Arabia among the world's most densely armed nations.

Saudi Arabia has security relationships with the United States, the United Kingdom, and France, which provide training and weapons; the kingdom is the largest recipient of U.S. arms in the world, accounting for 12 percent of all U.S. arms exports in 2024. Saudi Arabia has a long-standing military relationship with Pakistan and is speculated to have secretly funded the latter's atomic bomb programme with the intention of purchasing its atomic weapons; in September 2025, both countries entered into a mutual defence pact. Since 2018, Saudi Arabia has repeatedly expressed willingness to acquire or develop nuclear weapons in the event that its chief regional rival, Iran, develops one.

In March 2015, Saudi Arabia mobilized 150,000 troops and 100 fighter jets to support its intervention in the civil war in neighbouring Yemen. By early 2016, Saudi ground forces and their coalition allies captured Aden and parts of southwest Yemen, though the Houthis continued to control northern Yemen and the capital city Sanaa. From there the Houthis launched successful attacks across the border into Saudi Arabia. The Saudi military has also carried out an aerial bombing campaign and a naval blockade aimed at stopping weapons shipments to the Houthis. As of 2024, Saudi Arabia had 2,500 troops actively participating in the conflict in Yemen.

=== Human rights ===
The Saudi government, which mandates Muslim and non-Muslim observance of Sharia law under the absolute rule of the House of Saud, has been denounced by international organizations and governments for violating human rights. The authoritarian regime is consistently ranked among the "worst of the worst" in Freedom House's annual survey of political and civil rights. According to Amnesty International, security forces torture and ill-treat detainees to extract confessions to be used as evidence against them. Saudi Arabia abstained from the UN vote adopting the Universal Declaration of Human Rights, saying it contradicted Sharia. Mass executions, such as those carried out in 2016, 2019, 2022, and 2025 have been condemned by international rights groups.

Since 2001, Saudi Arabia has engaged in internet censorship. Most censorship falls into two categories: "immoral" content (mostly pornographic and LGBT-supportive sites along with sites promoting any religion other than Sunni Islam) and blacklisted political content critical of the regime, as dictated by Saudi Arabia's Ministry of Media.

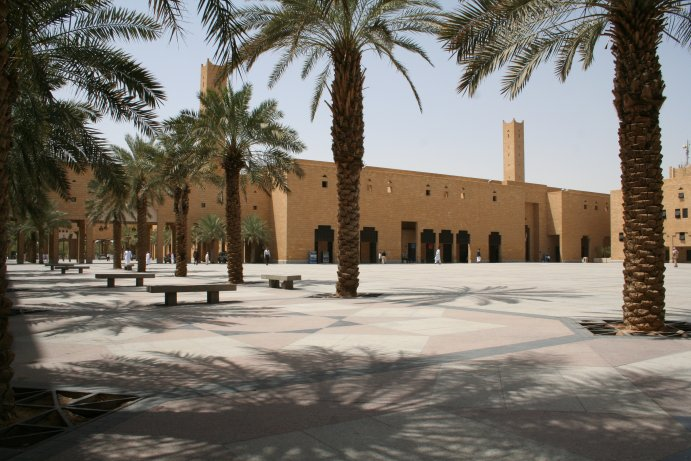
Deera Square, central Riyadh. It is a former site of public beheadings.

Saudi Arabian law does not recognize sexual orientations or religious freedom, and the public practice of non-Muslim religions is actively prohibited. The justice system regularly engages in capital punishment, which has included public executions by decapitation. In line with Sharia in the Saudi justice system, the death penalty can theoretically be imposed for a range of offences, including murder, rape, armed robbery, repeated drug use, apostasy, adultery, and witchcraft. It can be carried out by beheading with a sword, stoning or by firing squad, followed by crucifixion (exposure of the body after execution). In 2022, the Saudi Crown Prince stated that capital punishments will be removed "except for one category mentioned in the Quran", namely homicide, under which certain conditions must be applied. In April 2020, the Saudi Supreme Court issued a directive to eliminate the punishment of flogging from the court system, being replaced by imprisonment or fines.

Historically, Saudi women have faced discrimination in many aspects of their lives and were effectively treated as legal minors under the male guardianship system. The treatment of women has been referred to as "sex segregation" and "gender apartheid". Since the 2000s, the kingdom has made several attempts to improve the status of women in order to elevate their global standing. As of June 2023, the kingdom has reportedly reversed its ban on women "becoming lawyers, engineers, or geologists" and established "aggressive affirmative action programmes", doubling the female labour force participation rate. It has added "its first female newspaper editors, diplomats, TV anchors and public prosecutors", with a female head of the Saudi stock exchange and member on the board of Saudi Aramco. In June 2018, the Saudi government issued a law allowing women to drive. However, an investigation by The Guardian newspaper in 2025 found that the Dar al-Reaya, officially "care homes", continued to be effectively "jails" for women whose families wished to institutionalize them for disobedience, extramarital sexual relations or being absent from home. Some women are sent to Dar al-Reaya to protect a family's reputation after a woman is sexually abused by a brother or father. Treatment was reported to be "hellish": with solitary confinement, flogging, and no family contact.

Saudi Arabia is a notable destination country for men and women trafficked for the purposes of slave labour and sexual exploitation. Migrants from Asia and Africa are employed in the country's construction, hospitality, and domestic work sectors under the kafala system, which human rights groups say is linked to slavery.

== Economy ==
With gross domestic product (GDP) at over $1.1 trillion nominally, and more than $2.3 trillion by purchasing power parity (PPP), Saudi Arabia has the second largest economy in the Middle East (after Turkey), the largest in the Arab world, and the 18th largest in the world. It has the world's second-largest proven reserves of petroleum, of which it is third largest producer and the largest exporter; the country also has the sixth-largest proven natural gas reserves. Saudi Arabia is considered an "energy superpower," having the third highest total estimated value of natural resources, valued at US$34.4 trillion in 2016.

Saudi Arabia has a command economy based largely on petroleum; the oil industry accounts for roughly 63% of budget revenue, 67% of export earnings, and 45% of nominal GDP compared with 40% from the private sector. It is strongly dependent on foreign workers, with about 80% of private sector employees being non-Saudi. Challenges to the economy include halting or reversing the decline in per-capita income, improving education to prepare youth for the workforce and providing them with employment, diversifying the economy, stimulating the private sector and housing construction, and diminishing corruption and inequality.

The Organization of Petroleum Exporting Countries (OPEC) limits its members' oil production based on their "proven reserves". Saudi Arabia's published reserves have shown little change since 1980, with the main exception being an increase of about 100 billion barrels (1.6×10^{10} m^{3}) between 1987 and 1988. Matthew Simmons has suggested that Saudi Arabia is greatly exaggerating its reserves and may soon show production declines (see peak oil).

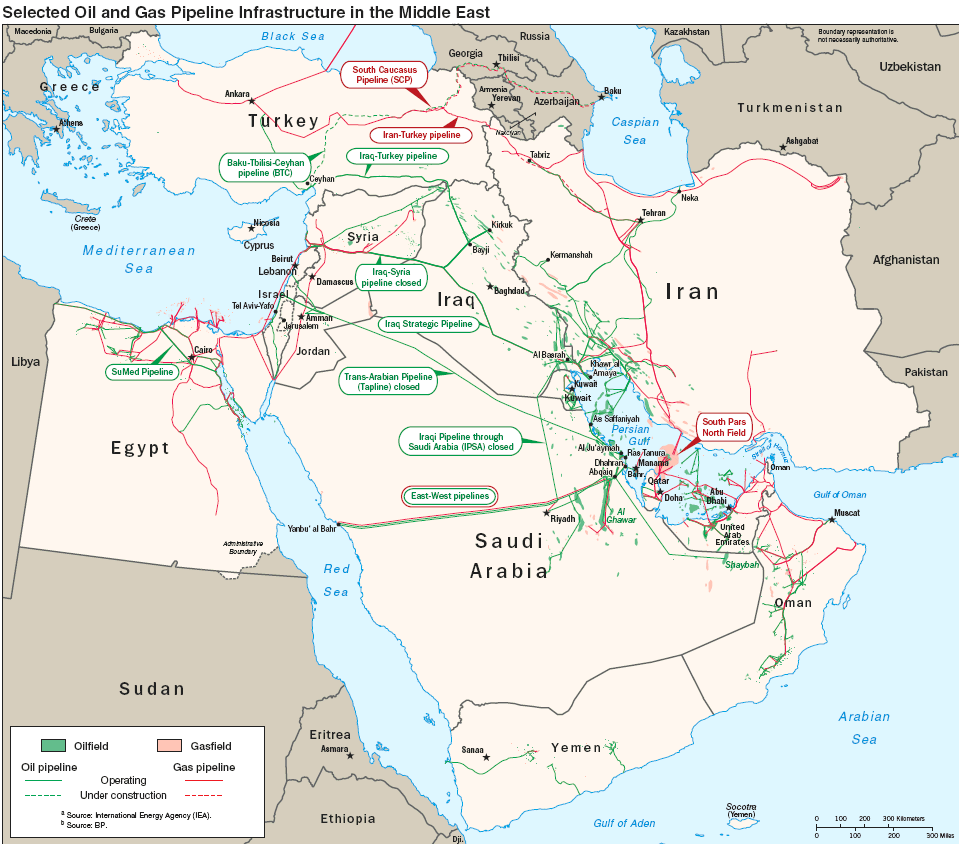
Map of oil and gas pipelines in the Middle-East

From 2003 to 2013, "several key services" were privatized—municipal water supply, electricity, telecommunications—and parts of education and health care, traffic control and car accident reporting were also privatized. According to Arab News columnist Abdel Aziz Aluwaisheg, "in almost every one of these areas, consumers have raised serious concerns about the performance of these privatized entities." In November 2005, Saudi Arabia was approved as a member of the World Trade Organization. Negotiations to join had focused on the degree to which Saudi Arabia is willing to increase market access to foreign goods and in 2000, the government established the Saudi Arabian General Investment Authority to encourage foreign direct investment in the kingdom. Saudi Arabia maintains a list of sectors in which foreign investment is prohibited, but the government plans to open some closed sectors such as telecommunications, insurance, and power transmission/distribution over time. The government has also made an attempt at "Saudizing" the economy, replacing foreign workers with Saudi nationals with limited success.

The hajj is an annual Islamic pilgrimage to Mecca, the holiest city for Muslims.

In addition to petroleum and gas, Saudi has a significant gold mining sector in the Mahd adh Dhahab region and significant other mineral industries, an agricultural sector (especially in the southwest) based on vegetables, fruits, dates etc. and livestock, and large number of temporary jobs created by the roughly two million annual hajj pilgrims. Saudi Arabia has had five-year "Development Plans" since 1970. Among its plans were to launch "economic cities" (e.g. King Abdullah Economic City) to diversify the economy and provide jobs.

Saudi Arabia is increasingly activating its ports in order to participate in trade between Europe and China in addition to oil transport. To this end, ports such as Jeddah Islamic Port or King Abdullah Economic City are being rapidly expanded, and investments are being made in logistics. The country is historically and currently part of the Maritime Silk Road.

Statistics on poverty in the kingdom are not available through the UN resources because the Saudi government does not issue any. The Saudi state discourages calling attention to or complaining about poverty. In December 2011, the Saudi interior ministry arrested three reporters and held them for almost two weeks for questioning after they uploaded a video on the topic to YouTube. Authors of the video claim that 22% of Saudis may be considered poor. Observers researching the issue prefer to stay anonymous because of the risk of being arrested.

The unexpected impact of the COVID-19 pandemic on the economy, along with Saudi Arabia's poor human rights records, laid unforeseen challenges before the development plans of the kingdom, where some of the programmes under 'Vision 2030' were also expected to be affected. In May 2020, the Finance Minister of Saudi Arabia admitted that the country's economy was facing a severe economical crisis for the first time in decades, because of the pandemic as well as declining global oil markets.

In July 2024 Saudi Arabia's Renewable Energy Localisation Company (RELC) has formed three joint ventures with Chinese companies to advance the kingdom's clean energy infrastructure. As part of Saudi Arabia's 2030 targets, the Public Investment Fund is actively promoting the localization of renewable energy components. RELC, a division of the sovereign fund, facilitates partnerships between global manufacturers and Saudi private sector firms to strengthen local supply chains. These initiatives aim to localize up to 75% of the components used in Saudi Arabia's renewable projects by 2030, positioning the country as a major global exporter of renewable technologies.

=== Agriculture ===
Saudi Arabia's predominantly arid environment, poor soil, and traditional nomadic lifestyle have long favoured pastoralism, particularly of camels, sheep, and goats; agricultural production has historically been localized and oriented towards basic subsistence. Less than two percent of the total land area is used for crops, with agriculture constituting only a fraction of GDP (2.5 percent) and employing a similar proportion of the workforce.

Initial attempts to develop dairy farming on a commercial scale occurred in the Al Kharj District south of Riyadh during the 1950s. Serious large-scale agricultural development began in the 1970s, particularly with wheat, with the government launching an extensive programme to promote modern farming technology; establish rural roads, irrigation networks and storage and export facilities; and encourage agricultural research and training institutions. The kingdom has continued prioritizing domestic food production through subsidies and generous incentives.

Owing to these efforts, there has been substantial growth in the production of all basic foods: Although it still imports the bulk of its food needs, Saudi Arabia is self-sufficient in several commodities, particularly wheat, meat, milk, and eggs. The country exports dates, dairy products, eggs, fish, poultry, fruits, vegetables, and flowers. Dates, which are indigenous to Saudi Arabia and a traditional staple of its diet, are now mainly grown for global humanitarian aid; the kingdom is the world's second largest producer after Egypt, producing 1.6 million tonnes as of 2022. Another indigenous crop, the olive, is also heavily cultivated: The Al Jouf region has millions of olive trees—including the world's largest olive farm at 7,713 hectares—and the number is expected to increase to 20 million trees. Saudi farmers also grow substantial amounts of other grains such as barley, sorghum, and millet.

Saudi Arabia has some of the most modern and largest dairy farms in the Middle East; milk production boasts a productive annual rate of 6,800 litres (1,800 US gallons) per cow, one of the highest in the world. Saudi dairy company Almarai is the largest vertically integrated dairy company in the Middle East, and the largest dairy firm in the world by volume; it operates the world's largest dairy farm at Al Safi.

Following an end to domestic wheat production in 2016 to preserve water, Saudi Arabia encouraged small famers to produce wheat in 2019 through a domestic production programme established under the Saudi Ministry of Environment, Water, and Agriculture (MEWA). In 2025, wheat production is forecast to more than double the five-year average.

Consuming nonrenewable groundwater resulted in the loss of an estimated four-fifths of the total groundwater reserves by 2012. About half the arable land is cultivated through rain-fed dry farming (mostly in Asir), two-fifths through the planting of local tree crops (namely dates and olives), and the remainder by irrigation, mostly by underground water.

As part of the Saudi Green Initiative, which seeks to restore vegetation cover and ecological sustainability, the kingdom aims to plant 100 million mangroves; as of 2024, the National Centre for Vegetation Cover Development and Combating Desertification announced it had planted 13 million seedlings.

=== Water supply and sanitation ===
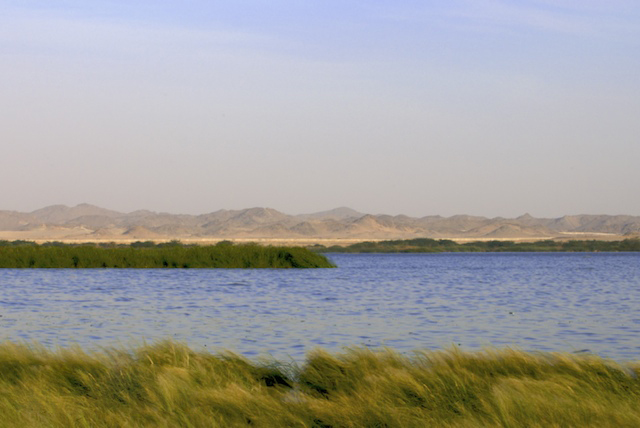
Al-Musk Lake close to Jeddah

One of the main challenges for Saudi Arabia is water scarcity. Substantial investments have been undertaken in seawater desalination, water distribution, sewerage and wastewater treatment. Today about 50% of drinking water comes from desalination, 40% from the mining of non-renewable groundwater, and 10% from surface water in the mountainous southwest of the country. Saudi Arabia is suffering from a major depletion of the water in its underground aquifers and a resultant break down and disintegration of its agriculture as a consequence. As a result of the catastrophe, Saudi Arabia has bought agricultural land in the United States, Argentina, and Africa. Saudi Arabia ranked as a major buyer of agricultural land in foreign countries.

Saudi Arabia was the third most water stressed country in the world in 2022.

According to the Joint Monitoring Programme (JMP) for Water Supply and Sanitation of the WHO and UNICEF, the latest reliable source on access to water and sanitation in Saudi Arabia is the 2004 census. It indicates that 97% of the population had access to an improved source of drinking water and 99% had access to improved sanitation. For 2015, the JMP estimates that access to sanitation increased to 100%. Sanitation was primarily through on-site solutions, and about 40% of the population was connected to sewers. In 2015, 886,000 people lacked access to "improved" water.

=== Tourism ===
In 2019, Saudi Arabia adopted a general tourism travel visa to allow non-Muslims to visit. Although most tourism largely involves religious pilgrimages, there is growth in the leisure tourism sector. According to the World Bank, approximately 14.3 million people visited Saudi Arabia in 2012, making it the world's 19th-most-visited country. Tourism is an important component of the Saudi Vision 2030, and according to a report conducted by BMI Research in 2018 both religious and non-religious tourism have significant potential for expansion.

The kingdom offers an electronic visa for foreign visitors to attend sports events and concerts. In 2019, the kingdom announced its plans to open visa applications for visitors, where people from about 50 countries would be able to get tourist visas to Saudi. In 2020 it was announced that holders of a US, UK or Schengen visa are eligible for a Saudi electronic visa upon arrival.

== Demographics ==
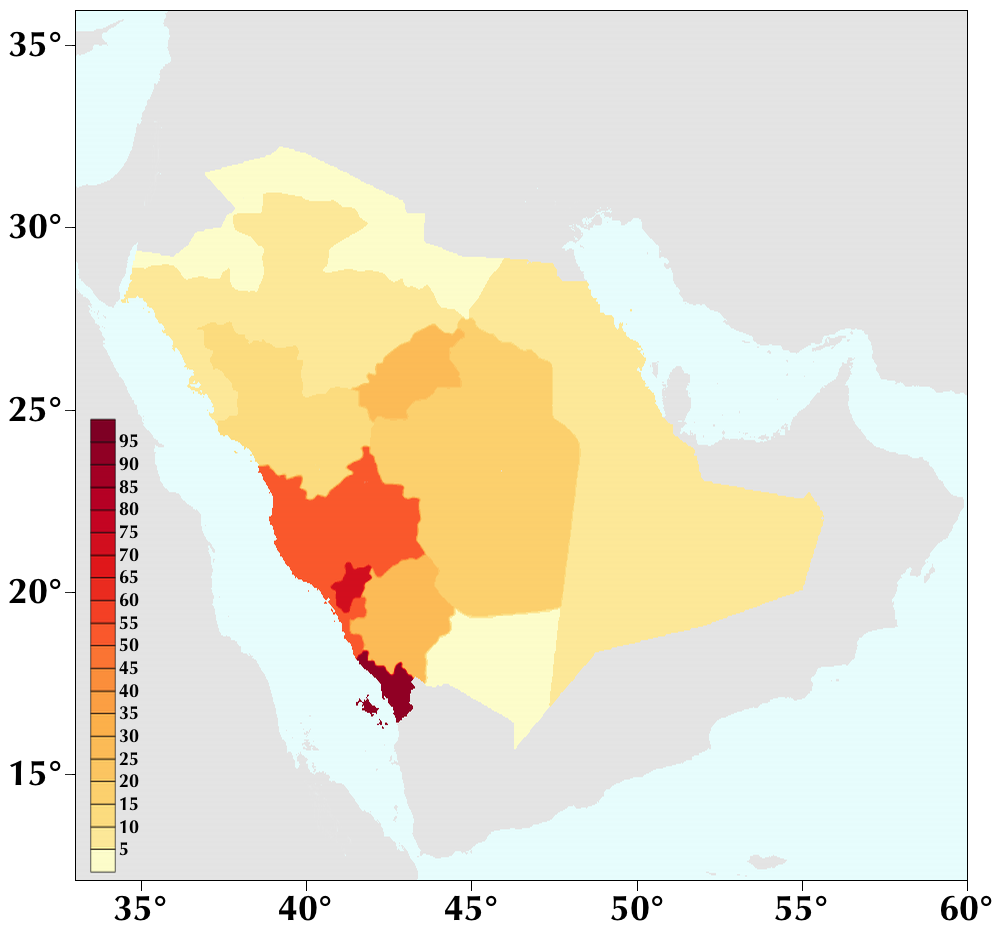
Saudi Arabia population density (people per km^{2})

Saudi Arabia's reported population is 32,175,224 as of 2022, making it the fourth most populous country in the Arab world. Close to 42% of its inhabitants are immigrants, mostly from the Middle East, South Asia, and Africa.

The Saudi population has grown rapidly since 1950, when it was estimated at 3 million. For much of the 20th century, the country had one of the highest population growth rates in the world, at around 3% annually; it continues to grow at a rate of 1.62% per year, slightly higher than the rest of the Middle East and North Africa. Consequently, the Saudi people are quite young by global standards, with over half the population under 25 years old.

Ethnically, 90% of citizens are Arab with 10% holding Afro-Arab ancestry. Most Saudis are concentrated in the southwest; Hejaz, which is the most populated region, is home to one-third of the population, followed by neighbouring Najd (28%) and the Eastern Province (15%). As late as 1970, most Saudis lived a subsistence life in the rural provinces, but in the last half of the 20th century, the kingdom has urbanized rapidly: as of 2023, about 85% of Saudis live in urban metropolitan areas—specifically Riyadh, Jeddah, and Dammam. As recently as the early 1960s, Saudi Arabia's slave population was estimated at 300000. Slavery was officially abolished in 1962.

Largest cities or towns in Saudi Arabia Data.gov.sa (2013/2014/2016)
Rank	Name	Regions	Pop.	Rank	Name	Regions	Pop.
1	Riyadh	Riyadh	6,506,700	11	Qatif	Eastern	559,300
2	Jeddah	Mecca	3,976,400	12	Khamis Mushait	Asir	549,000
3	Mecca	Mecca	1,919,900	13	Ha'il	Ha'il	441,900
4	Medina	Medina	1,271,800	14	Hafar al-Batin	Eastern	416,800
5	Hofuf	Eastern	1,136,900	15	Jubail	Eastern	411,700
6	Ta'if	Mecca	1,109,800	16	Kharj	Riyadh	404,100
7	Dammam	Eastern	975,800	17	Abha	Asir	392,500
8	Buraidah	Al-Qassim	658,600	18	Najran	Najran	352,900
9	Khobar	Eastern	626,200	19	Yanbu	Al Madinah	320,800
10	Tabuk	Tabuk	609,000	20	Al Qunfudhah	Mecca	304,400

=== Language ===
The official language is Arabic. There are four main regional dialect groups spoken by Saudis: Najdi (about 14.6 million speakers), Hejazi (about 10.3 million speakers), Gulf (about 0.96 million speakers), and Southern Hejaz-Tihama dialects. Faifi is spoken by about 50000. The Mehri language is also spoken by around 20000 Mehri citizens. Saudi Sign Language is the principal language of the deaf community, amounting to around 100000 speakers. The large expatriate communities have brought their languages as well, the most numerous of which, according to 2018 data, are Bengali (~1 500000), Tagalog (~900000), Punjabi (~800000), Urdu (~740000), Egyptian Arabic (~600000), Rohingya, North Levantine Arabic (both ~500000) and Malayalam.

=== Religion ===
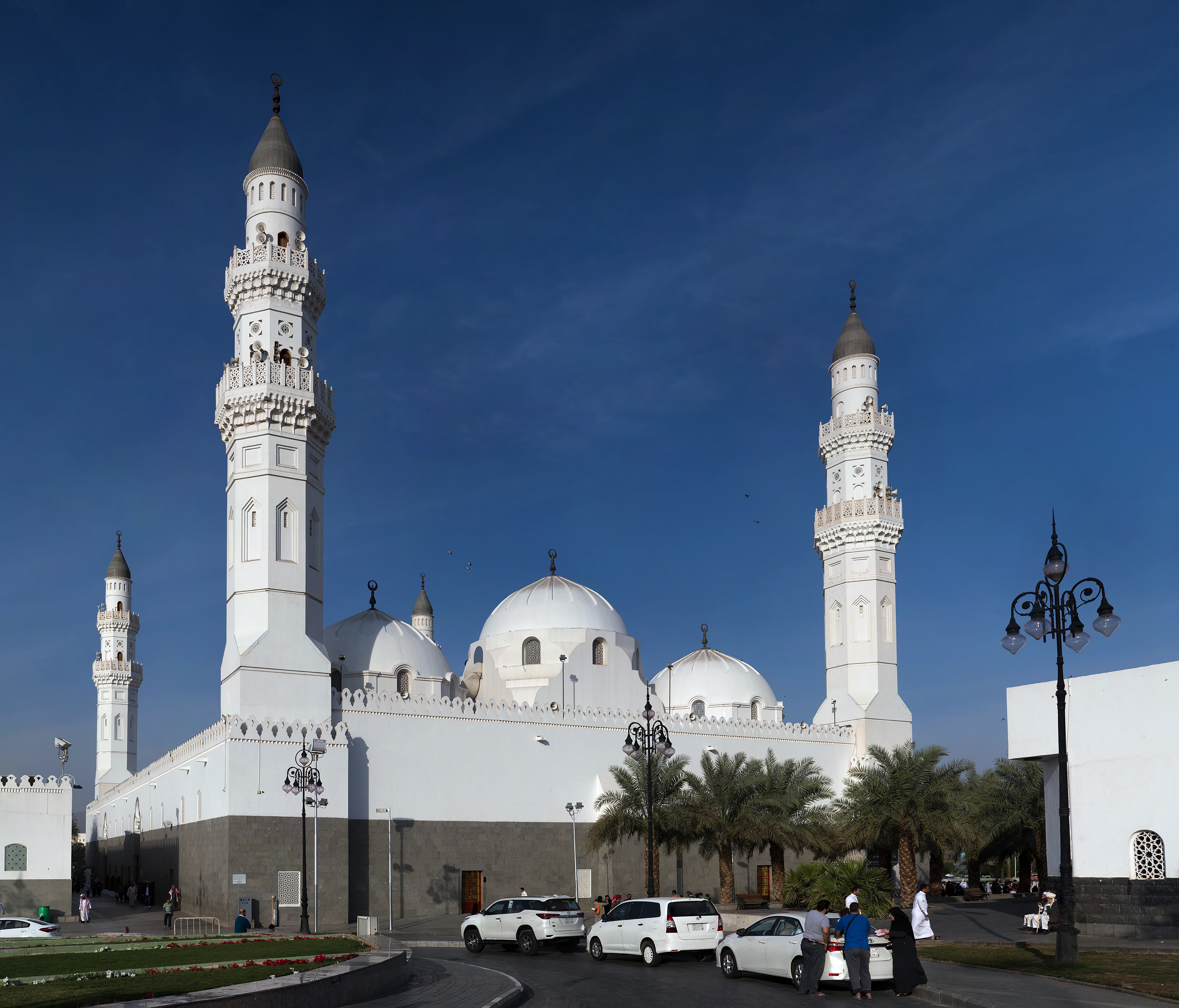
Quba Mosque in Medina, Hejaz is considered to be one of the oldest mosques, dating to the lifetime of the Islamic prophet Muhammad. (Note: The Mosque of the Companions in the Eritrean city of Massawa dates to approximately the same period, the 7th century CE.)

Religion in Saudi Arabia (ARDA 2020 est.)
1. Sunni (80.1%)
2. Shia (8.89%)
3. Other Muslim (0.45%)
4. Catholic (6.52%)
5. Other Christian (0.46%)
6. Hinduism (2.03%)
7. Buddhism (0.33%)
8. None (0.71%)
9. Other (0.54%)

Virtually all Saudi inhabitants are Muslim; as by law Saudi citizens are Muslim. Estimates of the Sunni population range between 85% and 90%, with the remaining 10 to 15% being Shia Muslim, practicing either Twelver Shi'ism or Sulaymani Ismailism. The official and dominant form of Sunni Islam is Salafism, commonly known as Wahhabism, (Note: Proponents prefer the name Salafist, considering Wahhabi derogatory.) which was founded in the Arabian Peninsula by Muhammad ibn Abd al-Wahhab in the 18th century. Other denominations, including Shia Islam, are systematically suppressed by the state apparatus. Atheism and apostasy are punishable by death or by life imprisonment.

Christianity is the second largest religion in Saudi Arabia, estimated at around 2.1 million, of whom the vast majority are foreign workers. Saudi Arabia allows Christians to enter the country as temporary foreign workers but does not allow them to practice their faith openly. There are officially no Saudi citizens who are Christians, as Saudi Arabia forbids religious conversion from Islam (apostasy) and punishes it by death. There are over 708,000 Hindus in Saudi Arabia, comprising the third largest religion; like other minority faiths in the country, with all of them coming from South Asia. There may be a significant fraction of atheists and agnostics, although they are officially designated as "terrorists". In its 2017 religious freedom report, the U.S. State Department named Saudi Arabia a Country of Particular Concern, denoting systematic, ongoing, and egregious violations of religious freedom.

=== Education ===
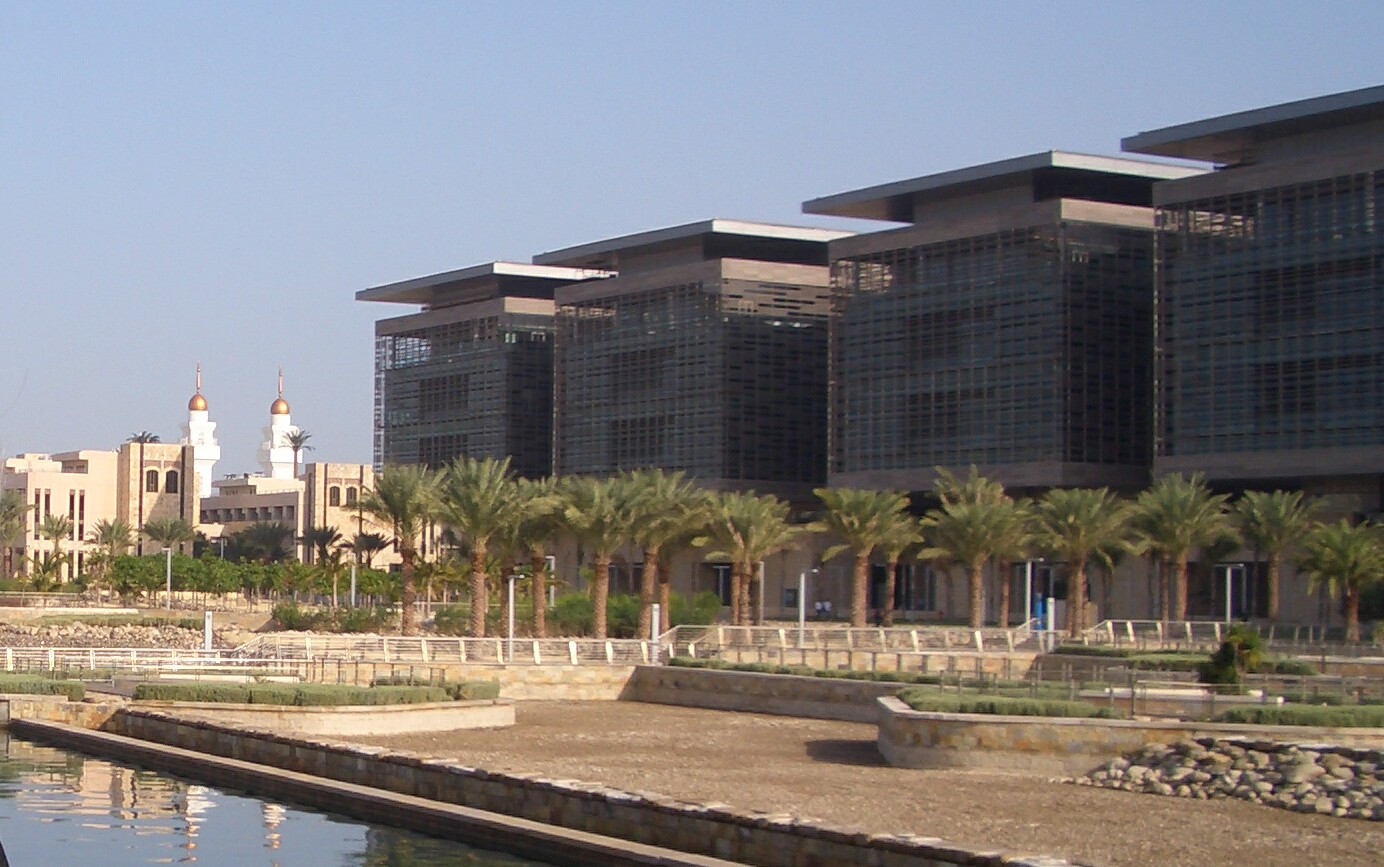
Laboratory buildings at KAUST

Education is free at all levels, although higher education is restricted to citizens only. The school system is composed of elementary, intermediate, and secondary schools. Classes are segregated by sex. At the secondary level, students are able to choose from three types of schools: general education, vocational or technical, and religious. The rate of literacy is 99% among males and 96% among females in 2020. Youth literacy rose to approximately 99.5% for both sexes.

The entrance gate of King Saud University, the kingdom's oldest university, founded in 1957

Higher education has expanded rapidly, with large numbers of universities and colleges being founded particularly since 2000. Institutions of higher education include King Saud University at Riyadh, the Islamic University at Medina, and the King Abdulaziz University in Jeddah. Princess Norah University is the largest women's university in the world. King Abdullah University of Science and Technology, known as KAUST, is the first mixed-gender university campus in Saudi Arabia and was founded in 2009. Other colleges and universities emphasize curricula in sciences and technology, military studies, religion, and medicine. Institutes devoted to Islamic studies, in particular, abound. Women typically receive college instruction in segregated institutions.

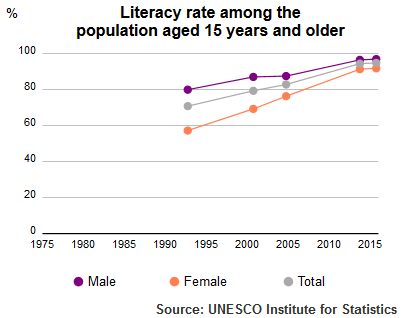
UIS literacy rate Saudi Arabia population, 15 plus, 1990–2015

The Academic Ranking of World Universities, known as Shanghai Ranking, ranked five Saudi institutions among its 2022 list of the 500 top universities in the world. The QS World University Rankings lists 14 Saudi universities among the 2022 world's top universities and 23 universities among the top 100 in the Arab world. The 2022 list of U.S. News & World Report Best Global University Ranking ranked King Abdulaziz University among the top 50 universities in the world and KAUST among the top 100 universities in the world.

In 2018, Saudi Arabia ranked 28th worldwide in terms of high-quality research output according to the scientific journal Nature. Saudi Arabia spends 9% of its gross domestic product on education, compared with the global average of 5%. Saudi Arabia was ranked 46th in the Global Innovation Index in 2025, up from 68th in 2019.

The Saudi education system has been accused of encouraging Islamic terrorism, leading to reform efforts. Following the 9/11 attacks, the government aimed to tackle the twin problems of encouraging extremism and the inadequacy of the country's university education for a modern economy, by slowly modernizing the education system through the "Tatweer" reform programme. The Tatweer programme is reported to have a budget of approximately US$2 billion and focuses on moving teaching away from the traditional Saudi methods of memorization and rote learning towards encouraging students to analyse and problem-solve. It also aims to create an education system which will provide a more secular and vocationally based training.

In 2021, the Washington Post reported on the measures taken by Saudi Arabia to clean textbooks from paragraphs considered antisemitic and sexist. The paragraphs dealing with the punishment of homosexuality or same-sex relations have been deleted, as well as the expressions of admiration for the extremist martyrdom. Antisemitic expressions and calls to fight the Jews became fewer. David Weinberg, director of international affairs for the Anti-Defamation League, said that references to demonizing Jews, Christians, and Shiites have been removed from some places or have toned down. The U.S. State Department expressed in an e-mail that it welcomed the changes. The Saudi Ministry of Foreign Affairs supports a training programme for Saudi teachers.

=== Health care ===
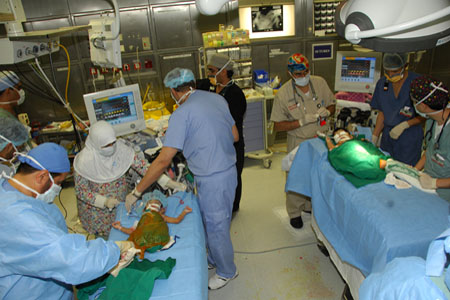
Saudi twins receiving care from doctors at King Abdulaziz Medical City in Riyadh

Saudi Arabia has a national health care system in which the government provides free health care services through government agencies. Saudi Arabia has been ranked among the 26 best countries in providing high quality healthcare. The Ministry of Health is the major government agency entrusted with the provision of preventive, curative, and rehabilitative health care. The ministry's origins can be traced to 1925, when several regional health departments were established, with the first in Makkah. The various healthcare institutions were merged to become a ministerial body in 1950. The Health Ministry created a friendly competition between each of the districts and between different medical services and hospitals. This idea resulted in the creation of the "Ada'a" project launched in 2016. The new system is a nationwide performance indicator, for services and hospitals. Waiting times and other major measurements improved dramatically across the kingdom.

Historical development of life expectancy in Saudi Arabia

A new strategy has been developed by the ministry, known as Diet and Physical Activity Strategy or DPAS for short, to address bad lifestyle choices. The ministry advised that there should be a tax increase on unhealthy food, drink, and cigarettes. This additional tax could be used to improve healthcare offerings. The tax was implemented in 2017. As part of the same strategy, calorie labels were added in 2019 to some food and drink products. Ingredients were also listed as an aim to reduce obesity and inform citizens with health issues to manage their diet. As part of the ongoing focus on tackling obesity, women-only gyms were allowed to open in 2017. Sports offered in each of these gyms include bodybuilding, running and swimming to maintain higher standards of health.

Smoking in all age groups is widespread. Before 2010, Saudi Arabia had no policies banning or restricting smoking.

The MOH has been awarded "Healthy City" certificates by the World Health Organization (WHO) for the cities of Unayzah and Riyadh Al Khabra as 4th and 5th Healthy Cities in Saudi Arabia. The WHO had earlier classified three Saudi Arabian cities, Ad Diriyah, Jalajil, and Al-Jamoom as "Healthy city", as part of the WHO Healthy Cities Programme. Recently Al-Baha has also been classified as a healthy city to join the list of global healthy cities approved by the World Health Organization.

In May 2019, the then Saudi Minister of Health Tawfiq bin Fawzan AlRabiah received a global award on behalf of the Kingdom for combating smoking through social awareness, treatment, and application of regulations. The award was presented as part of the 72nd session of the World Health Assembly, held in Geneva in May 2019. After becoming one of the first nations to ratify the WHO Framework Convention on Tobacco Control in 2005, it plans to reduce tobacco use from 12.7% in 2017, to 5% in 2030.

Saudi Arabia has a life expectancy of 78 years (77 for males and 80 for females) according to the latest data for the year 2022 from the World Bank. Infant mortality in 2022 was 6 per 1000 (6 for males and 5 for females). In 2022, 71.8% of the adult population was overweight and 40.6% was obese.

=== Foreigners ===
The Central Department of Statistics & Information estimated the foreign population at the end of 2014 at 33% (10.1 million). The CIA Factbook estimated that as of 2013 foreign nationals living in Saudi Arabia made up about 21% of the population. Other sources report differing estimates. Indian: 1.5 million, Pakistani: 1.3 million, Egyptian: 900000, Yemeni: 800000, Bangladeshi: 400000, Filipino: 500000, Jordanian/Palestinian: 260000, Indonesian: 250000, Sri Lankan: 350000, Sudanese: 250000, Syrian: 100000 and Turkish: 80000.

According to The Guardian, as of 2013 there were more than half a million foreign-born domestic workers. Most have backgrounds in poverty and come from Africa, the Indian subcontinent and Southeast Asia. To work in Saudi Arabia, they must often pay large sums to recruitment agencies in their home countries. The agencies then handle the necessary legal paperwork.

As the Saudi population grows and oil export revenues stagnate, pressure for "Saudization" (the replacement of foreign workers with Saudis) has grown, and the Saudi government hopes to decrease the number of foreign nationals in the country. Saudi Arabia expelled 800000 Yemenis in 1990 and 1991 and has built a Saudi–Yemen barrier against an influx of illegal immigrants and against the smuggling of drugs and weapons. In November 2013, Saudi Arabia expelled thousands of illegal Ethiopian residents from the kingdom. Various Human Rights entities have criticized Saudi Arabia's handling of the issue.

Over 500000 undocumented migrant workers—mostly from Somalia, Ethiopia, and Yemen—have been detained and deported since 2013. An investigation led by The Sunday Telegraph, exposed the condition of African migrants who were detained in Saudi Arabia allegedly for containing COVID-19 in the kingdom. They were beaten, tortured, and electrocuted. Many of the migrants died due to heatstroke or by suicide. The migrants lack proper living conditions, provision of food and water.

Foreigners cannot apply for permanent residency, though a specialized Premium Residency visa became available in 2019. Only Muslims can naturalize as Saudi citizens. Foreigners who have resided in the kingdom and hold degrees in various scientific fields may apply for Saudi citizenship, and exception made for Palestinians who are excluded unless married to a male Saudi national, because of Arab League instructions barring the Arab states from granting them citizenship. Saudi Arabia is not a signatory to the 1951 UN Refugee Convention.

== Culture ==
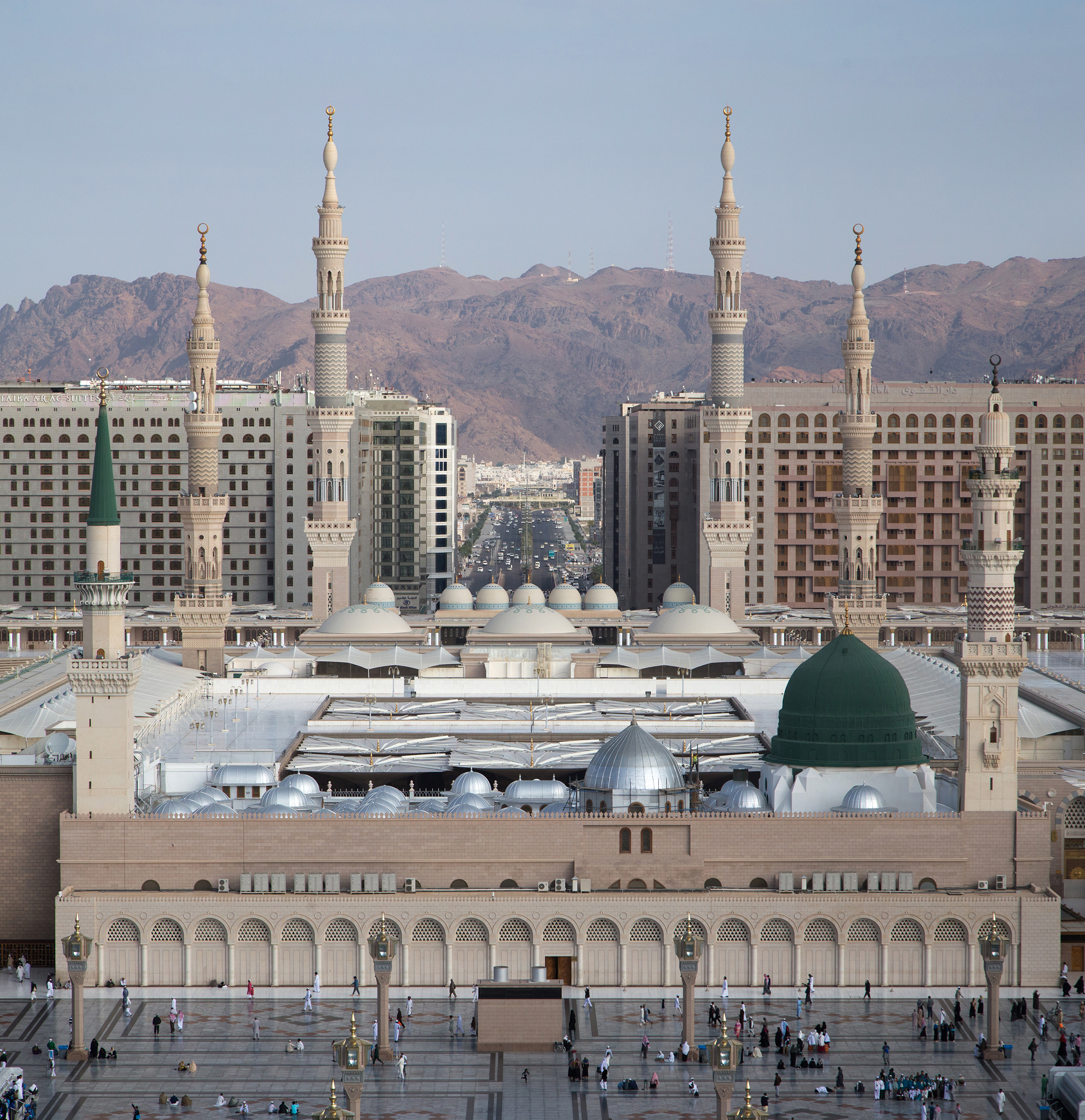
The Mosque of the Prophet in Medina containing the tomb of Muhammad

Saudi Arabia has millennia-old attitudes and traditions, often derived from Arab civilization. Some of the major factors that influence the culture are Islamic heritage and Arab traditions as well as its historical role as an ancient trade centre. The Kingdom also has a very family-oriented culture with an emphasis on preserving family traditions and kinship ties.

=== Religion in society ===
Religion is a core aspect of everyday life in Saudi Arabia; it plays a dominant role in the country's governance and legal system, and deeply influences culture and daily life, although the power of the religious establishment has been significantly eroded in the 2010s. The Hejaz region, where the Islamic holy cities of Mecca and Medina are located, is the destination of the Ḥajj pilgrimage, and often deemed to be the cradle of Islam. (Note: A number of Muslims, using justifications from the Quran, insist that Islam did not begin with Muhammad, but that it represents even previous prophets such as Abraham, who is credited with having established the sanctuary of Mecca.)

Islam is the state religion of Saudi Arabia. No law requires all citizens to be Muslim, but non-Muslims and many foreign and Saudi Muslims whose beliefs are deemed not to conform with the government's interpretation of Islam must practice their religion in private and are vulnerable to discrimination, harassment, detention, and, for foreigners, deportation. Neither Saudi citizens nor guest workers have freedom of religion. The dominant form of Islam in the kingdom—Wahhabism—arose in the central region of Najd, in the 18th century. Proponents call the movement "Salafism". The Saudi government has often been viewed as an active oppressor of Shia Muslims because of the funding of the Wahhabi ideology which denounces the Shia faith.

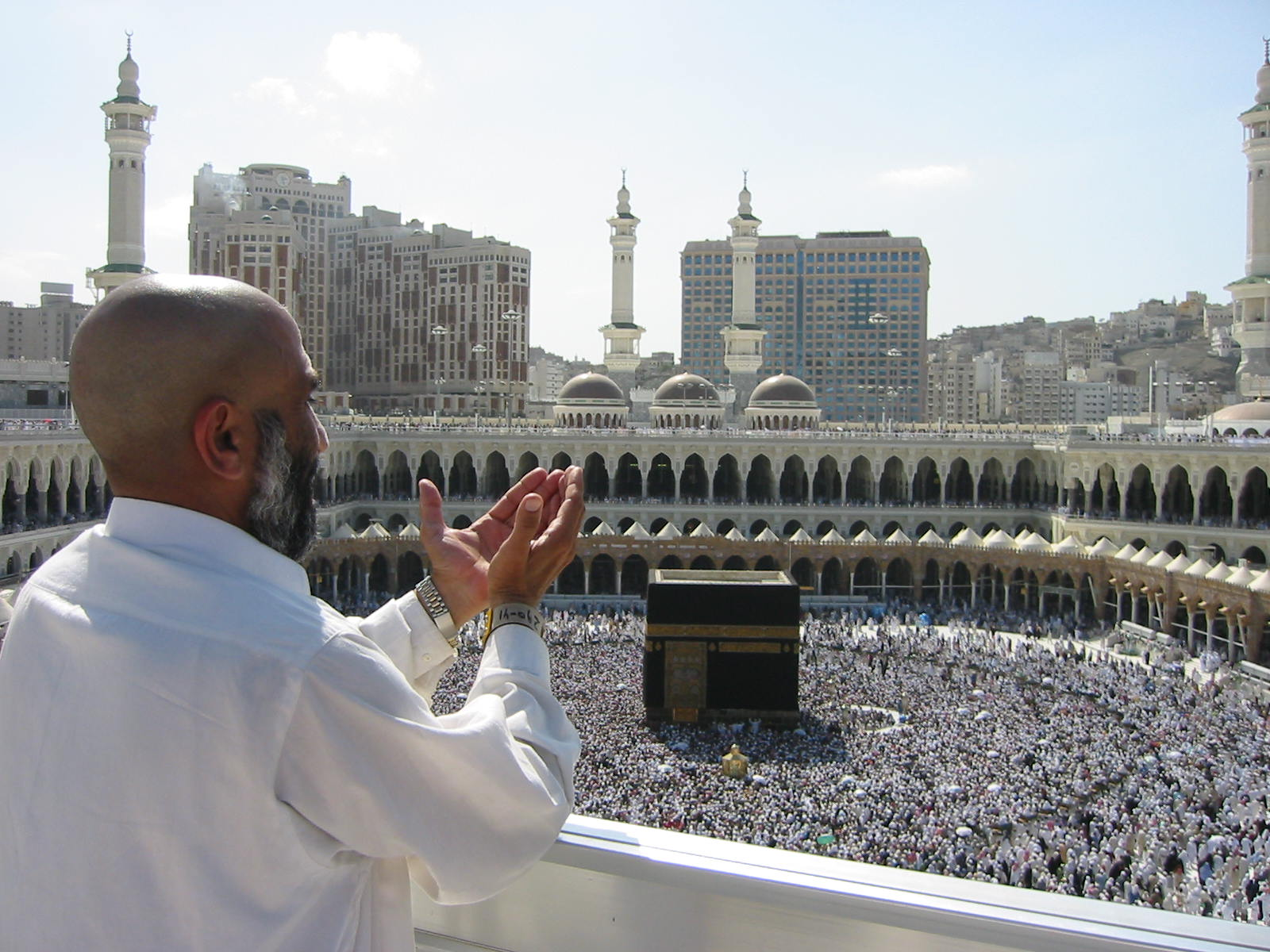
Supplicating pilgrim at Al-Masjid Al-Ḥarām (The Sacred Mosque) in Mecca. The Kaaba (the holiest site of Islam) is the cubic building in front of the pilgrim.

Saudi Arabia is one of the few countries that have "religious police" (known as Haia or Mutaween), who patrol the streets "enjoining good and forbidding wrong" by enforcing dress codes, strict separation of men and women, attendance at prayer (salat) five times each day, the ban on alcohol, and other aspects of Sharia. However, since 2016 the power of religious police was curbed, which barred them from pursuing, questioning, requesting identification or arresting suspects. In the privacy of homes, behaviour can be far looser, and reports from WikiLeaks indicate that low ranked members of the ruling Saudi Royal family indulge in parties with alcohol, drugs, and prostitutes.

=== Women in society ===
Throughout history, women did not have equal rights to men in the kingdom; the U.S. State Department considers the Saudi Arabian government's discrimination against women a "significant problem" and notes that women have few political rights because of the government's discriminatory policies. However, since 2017, a series of social reforms have been witnessed regarding women's rights.

Under previous Saudi law, all females were required to have a male guardian (wali), typically a father, brother, husband, or uncle (mahram). In 2019, this law was partially amended to exclude women over 21 from the requirement of a male guardian. The amendment also granted women rights in relation to the guardianship of minor children. Previously, girls and women were forbidden from travelling, conducting official business, or undergoing certain medical procedures without permission from their male guardians. In 2019, Saudi Arabia allowed women to travel abroad, register for divorce or marriage, and apply for official documents without the permission of a male guardian.

In 2006, Wajeha al-Huwaider, a leading Saudi feminist and journalist said "Saudi women are weak, no matter how high their status, even the 'pampered' ones among them, because they have no law to protect them from attack by anyone." Following this, Saudi Arabia implemented the anti-domestic violence law in 2014. Between 2017 and 2020, the country addressed issues of mobility, sexual harassment, pensions, and employment-discrimination protections. al-Huwaider and other female activists have applauded the general direction in which the country was headed.

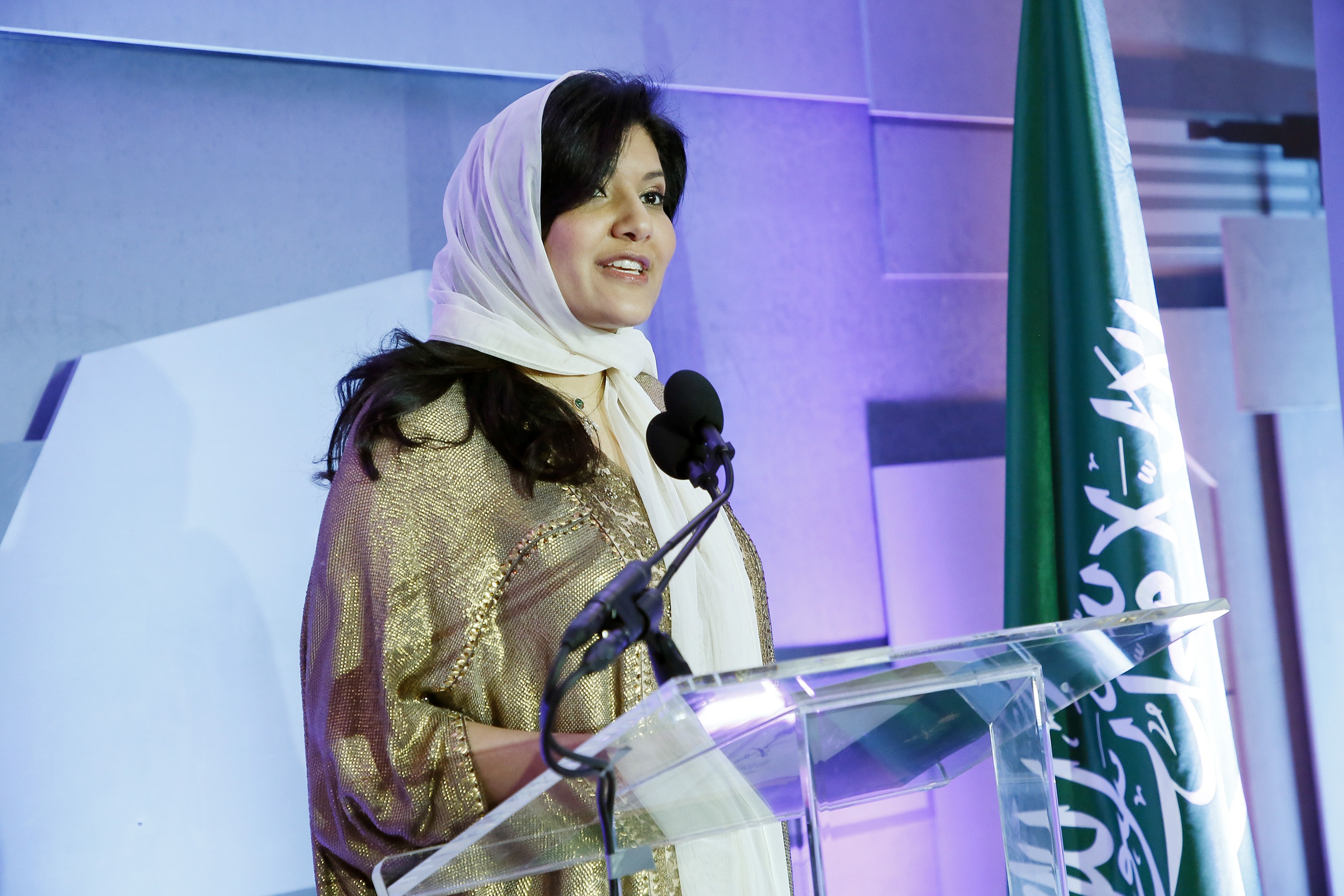
Princess Reema bint Bandar, the Saudi Ambassador to the United States of America, delivering an address at an event honouring the 75th anniversary of Saudi-US relations

Women face discrimination in the courts, where the testimony of one man equals that of two women in family and inheritance law. Polygamy is permitted for men, and men have a unilateral right to divorce their wives (talaq) without needing any legal justification. Historically, a woman could only obtain a divorce with the consent of her husband or judicially if her husband has harmed her; however, in 2022, women were granted the right to initiate divorce without the approval of a legal guardian under the new Personal Status Law. With regard to inheritance law, the Quran specifies that fixed portions of the deceased's estate must be left to the Qur'anic heirs and generally, female heirs receive half the portion of male heirs.

=== Heritage sites ===
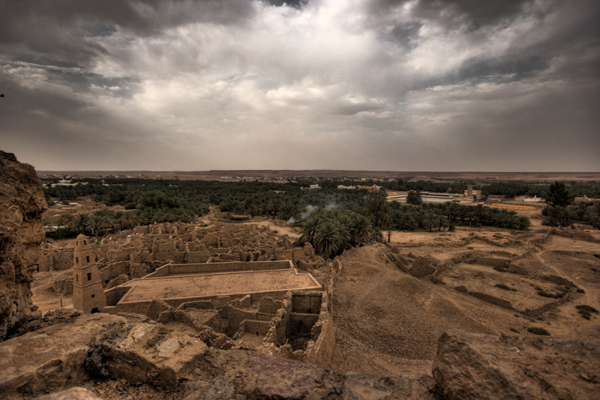
The 3000-year-old ancient historical city of Dumat al-Jandal in Al Jawf Province

Saudi Wahhabism is hostile to any reverence given to historical or religious places of significance for fear that it may give rise to 'shirk' (idolatry), and the most significant historic Muslim sites (in Mecca and Medina) are located in the western Saudi region of the Hejaz. As a consequence, under Saudi rule an estimated 95% of Mecca's historic buildings, most over a thousand years old, have been demolished for religious reasons. Critics claim that over the last 50 years, 300 historic sites linked to Muhammad, his family or companions have been lost, leaving fewer than 20 structures remaining in Mecca that date back to the time of Muhammad. Demolished structures include the mosque originally built by Muhammad's daughter Fatima, and other mosques founded by Abu Bakr (Muhammad's father-in-law and the first caliph), Umar (the second caliph), Ali (Muhammad's son-in-law and the fourth caliph), and Salman al-Farsi (another of Muhammad's companions). Other historic buildings that have been destroyed include the house of Khadijah, the wife of Muhammad, the house of Abu Bakr, now the site of the local Hilton hotel; the house of Ali-Oraid, the grandson of Muhammad, and the Mosque of Abu-Qubais, now the location of the King's palace in Mecca.

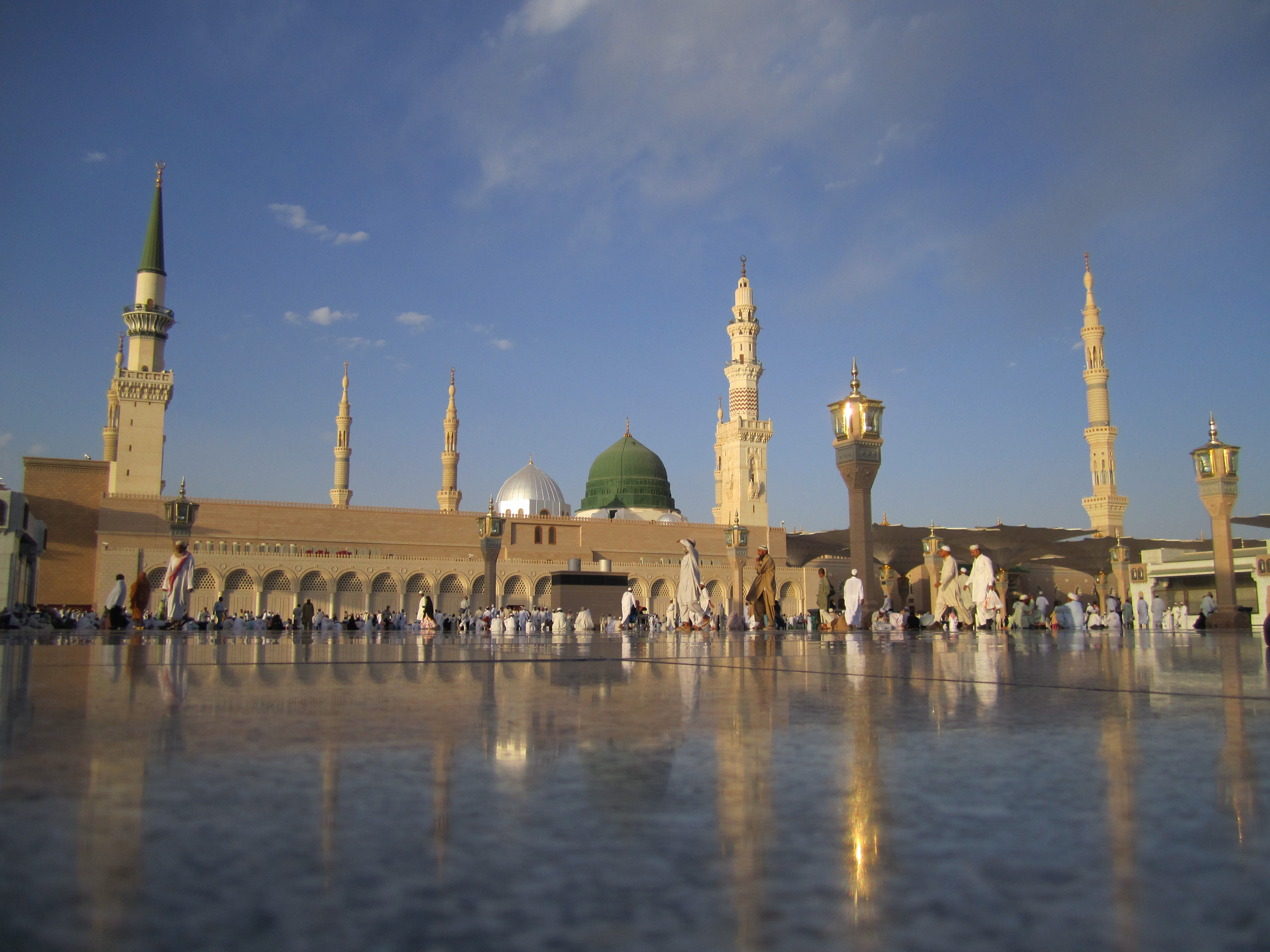
The Mosque of the Prophet in Medina containing the tomb of Muhammad

Eight cultural sites in Saudi Arabia are designated as UNESCO World Heritage Sites: Al-Hijr Archaeological Site (Madâin Sâlih); the Turaif district in Diriyah; Historic Jeddah, the Gate to Mecca; Al-Ahsa Oasis; Rock Art in the Hail Region; Ḥimā Cultural Area; 'Uruq Bani Ma'arid; and Qaryat al-Faw. Ten other sites submitted requests for recognition to UNESCO in 2015. There are six elements inscribed on UNESCO's Intangible Cultural Heritage of Humanity list: Al-Qatt Al-Asiri, female traditional interior wall decoration in Asir; Almezmar, drumming and dancing with sticks; Falconry, a living human heritage; Arabic coffee, a symbol of generosity; Majlis, a cultural and social space; Alardah Alnajdiyah, dance, drumming and poetry in Saudi Arabia.

In June 2014, the Council of Ministers approved a law that gives the Saudi Commission for Tourism and National Heritage the means to protect Saudi Arabia's ancient relics and historic sites. Within the framework of the 2016 National Transformation Programme, also known as Saudi Vision 2030, the kingdom allocated 900 million euros to preserve its historical and cultural heritage. Saudi Arabia also participates in the International Alliance for the Protection of Heritage in Conflict Areas, created in March 2017, with a contribution of 18.5 million euros.

In 2017, Crown Prince Mohammad bin Salman promised to return Saudi Arabia to the "moderate Islam" of the era before the 1979 Iranian revolution. A new centre, the King Salman Complex for the Prophet's Hadith, was established that year to monitor interpretations of Muhammad's hadiths to prevent them being used to justifying terrorism.

In March 2018, the Crown Prince met the Archbishop of Canterbury during a visit to the UK, pledging to promote interfaith dialogue. In Riyadh the following month King Salman met the head of the Vatican's Pontifical Council for Interreligious Dialogue. In July 2019, UNESCO signed a letter with the Saudi Minister of Culture in which Saudi Arabia contributed US$25 million to UNESCO for the preservation of heritage.

On November 5, 2024, archeologists published the news of an ancient city discovered in the Saudi oasis of Khaybar. The city named al-Natah, that dates back some 4,000 years, was inhabited during the Bronze Age around 2,400 BCE, and had about 500 houses.

=== Dress ===
Saudi Arabian dress strictly follows hijab (the Islamic principle of modesty, especially in dress). The predominantly loose and flowing, but covering, garments are suited to Saudi Arabia's desert climate. Traditionally, men usually wear a white ankle-length garment woven from wool or cotton (known as a thawb), with a keffiyeh (a large checkered square of cotton held in place by an agal) or a ghutra (a plain white square made of a finer cotton, also held in place by an agal) worn on the head. For rare chilly days, Saudi men wear a camel-hair cloak (bisht) over the top. In public, women are required to wear a black abaya or other black clothing that covers everything under the neck with the exception of their hands and feet, although most women cover their head for religious reasons. This requirement applies to non-Muslim women too and failure to abide can result in police action, particularly in more conservative areas. Women's clothes are often decorated with tribal motifs, coins, sequins, metallic thread, and appliques.

=== Arts and entertainment ===
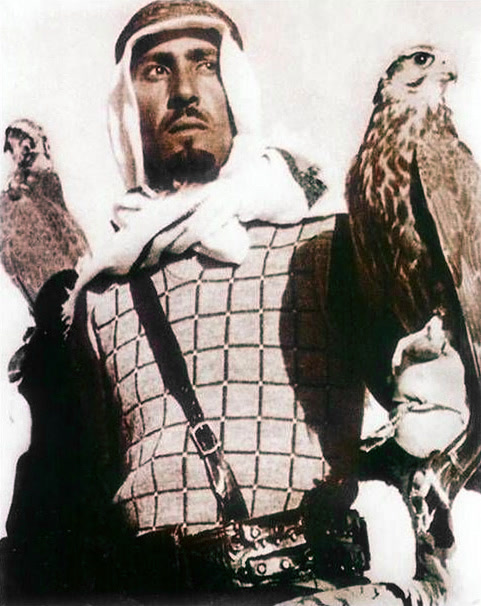
King Abdullah practising falconry, a traditional pursuit in the country

During the 1970s, cinemas were numerous in the kingdom although they were seen as contrary to Wahhabi norms. During the Islamic revival movement in the 1980s, and as a political response to an increase in Islamist activism including the 1979 seizure of the Grand Mosque in Mecca, the government closed all cinemas and theatres. However, with King Abdullah and King Salman's reforms, cinemas re-opened, including one in KAUST.

From the 18th century onward, Wahhabi fundamentalism discouraged artistic development inconsistent with its teaching. In addition, Sunni Islamic prohibition of creating representations of people have limited the visual arts, which tend to be dominated by geometric, floral, and abstract designs and by calligraphy. With the advent of the oil-wealth in the 20th century came exposure to outside influences, such as Western housing styles, furnishings, and clothes. Music and dance have always been part of Saudi life. Traditional music is generally associated with poetry and is sung collectively. Instruments include the rabābah, an instrument not unlike a three-string fiddle, and various types of percussion instruments, such as the ṭabl (drum) and the ṭār (tambourine). The national dance is a native sword dance known as ardah. Originating from Najd, it involves lines or circles of men and singing poetry. Bedouin poetry, known as nabaṭī, is popular.

Censorship has limited the development of Saudi literature, although several Saudi novelists and poets have achieved critical and popular acclaim in the Arab world—albeit generating official hostility in their home country. These include Ghazi Algosaibi, Mansour al-Nogaidan, Abdelrahman Munif, Turki al-Hamad, and Rajaa al-Sanea. In 2016, the General Entertainment Authority (GEA) was formed to oversee the expansion of the Saudi entertainment sector. The first concerts in Riyadh for 25 years took place the following year. In 2018 the first public cinema opened after a ban of 35 years, with plans to have more than 2000 screens running by 2030.

Developments in the arts in 2018 included Saudi Arabia's debut appearances at the Cannes Film Festival and the Venice Biennale.

=== TV and media ===
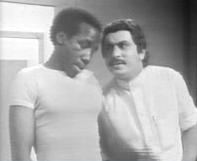
Saad Khader (left) and Mohammad Al-Ali (right) in 1979

Television was introduced in Saudi Arabia in 1954. Saudi Arabia is a major market for pan-Arab satellite and pay-TV. It controls the largest share of the pan-Arab broadcasting market; among the major Saudi-owned broadcasting companies are the Middle East Broadcasting Centre, Rotana, and the Saudi Broadcasting Authority. The Saudi government closely monitors media and restricts it under official state law. Changes have been made to lessen these restrictions; however, some government-led efforts to control information have also drawn international attention. As of 2022, Reporters Without Borders rates the kingdom's press a "very serious" situation.

Most of the early newspapers in the Persian Gulf region were established in Saudi Arabia. The first newspaper founded in the country and in the Persian Gulf area is Al Fallah, which was launched in 1920, and the first English-language newspaper is Arab News, which was launched in 1975. All of the newspapers published in Saudi Arabia are privately owned.

According to World Bank, as of 2020, 98% of the population of Saudi Arabia are internet users which puts it in the 8th rank among countries with the highest percentage of internet users. Saudi Arabia has one of the fastest 5G internet speeds in the world. The kingdom is the 27th largest market for e-commerce with a revenue of US$8 billion in 2021.

=== Cuisine ===
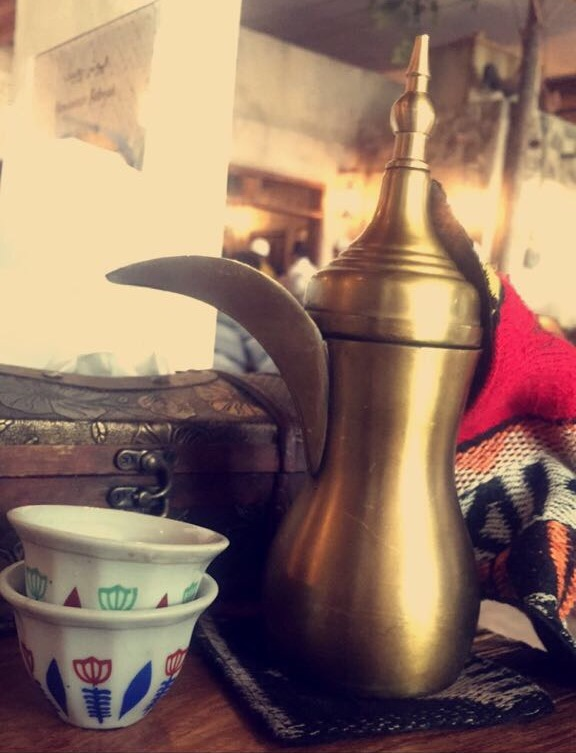
Arabic coffee is a traditional beverage in Arabian cuisine.

Saudi Arabian cuisine is similar to that of the surrounding countries in the Arabian Peninsula, and has influenced and been influenced by Turkish, Indian, Persian, and African food. Islamic dietary laws are enforced: pork is not allowed, and other animals are slaughtered in accordance with halal. Kebabs and falafel are popular, as is shawarma, a marinated grilled meat dish of lamb, mutton, or chicken. Kabsa, a rice dish with lamb, chicken, fish, or shrimp, is among the national dishes as is mandi. Flat, unleavened taboon bread is a staple of virtually every meal, as are dates, fresh fruit, yoghurt, and hummus. Coffee, served in the Arabic style, is the traditional beverage, but tea and various fruit juices are popular as well. The earliest substantiated evidence of either coffee drinking or knowledge of the coffee tree is from the 15th century, in the Sufi monasteries of Arabia.

=== Sport ===
==== Association football ====
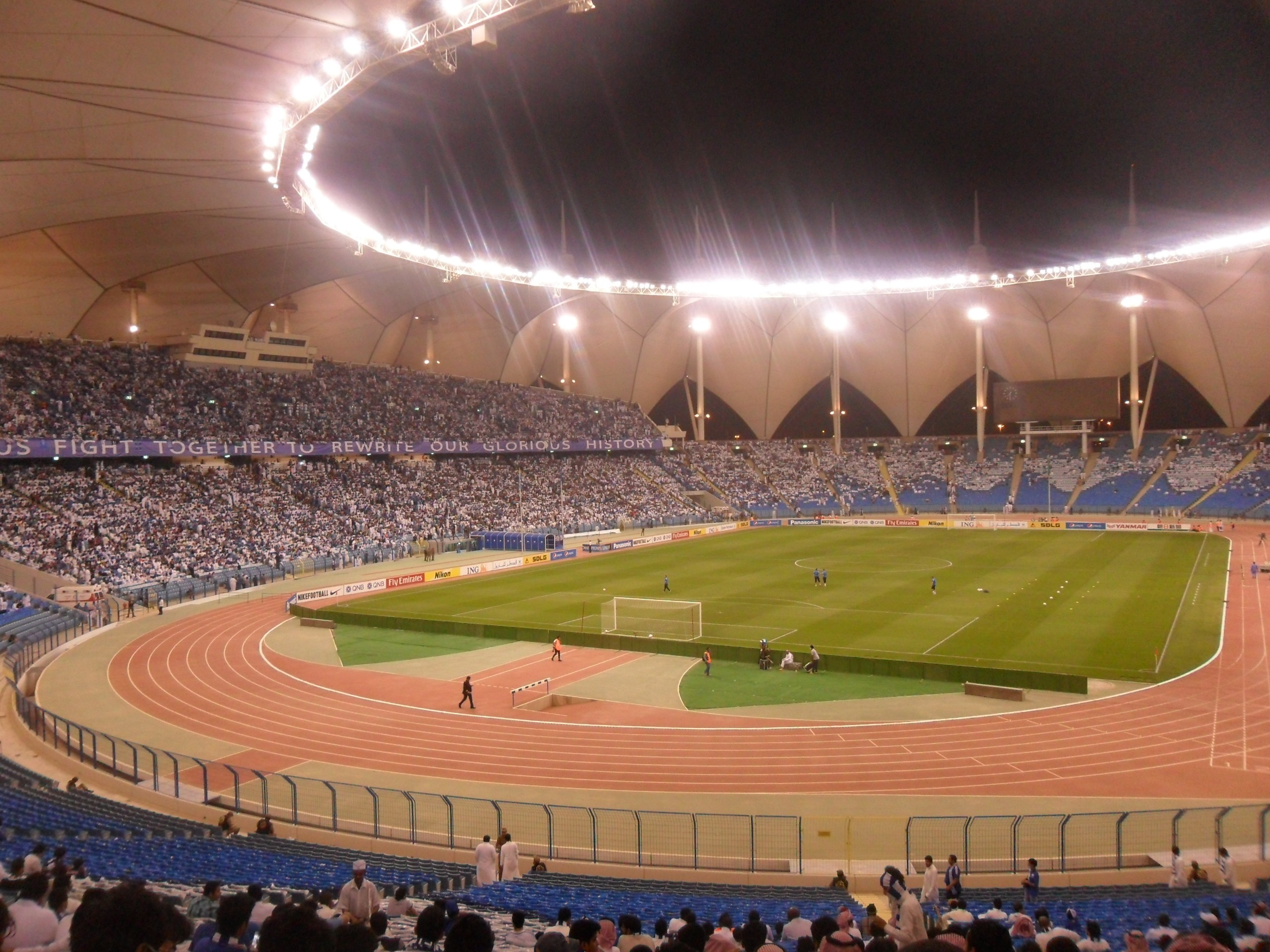
King Fahd International Stadium in Riyadh

Association football is the national sport of Saudi Arabia. The Saudi Arabia national football team is among Asia's strongest, having reached a joint record six AFC Asian Cup finals, winning three of those finals (1984, 1988, and 1996) and having qualified for the World Cup four consecutive times ever since debuting at the 1994 tournament. In the 1994 FIFA World Cup under the leadership of Jorge Solari, Saudi Arabia beat both Belgium and Morocco in the group stage before failing to defeat Sweden in the round of 16. During the 1992 FIFA Confederations Cup, which was played in Saudi Arabia, the country reached the final, losing 1–3 to Argentina. Since 2023, Saudi Arabia's Public Investment Fund has brought many elite footballers to the country's league, such as Cristiano Ronaldo, Roberto Firmino, Neymar, Sadio Mané, Jordan Henderson and Kalidou Koulibaly. Even domestic competitions from Spain and Italy have been held in Saudi Arabia during the 2020s. In December 2024, Saudi Arabia was confirmed as host of the 2034 FIFA World Cup. There are reportedly 11 new stadiums being built and airports are scheduled to be expanded to accommodate the expected influx of passengers.

The Saudi Pro League was established in 1957, (Note: The Saudi Pro League did not have its modern format until around 1977, and did not have its modern name until 2008.) and the tournament has been running ever since. The league had prior names like His Majesty's League and The King's Cup in the late 1950s and early 1960s. The first season in 1975/76 was abandoned after only 4 rounds, presumably after the assassination of King Faisal. The most dominant club in the Saudi Pro League for men is Al-Hilal SFC with 21 titles, followed by Al-Ittihad Club with 14 trophies, Al-Nassr FC with 11 Saudi Pro Leagues and Al-Ahli Saudi FC with 9 tournaments in second, third, and fourth respectively in terms of the number of trophies won by one specific club.

==== Other sports ====
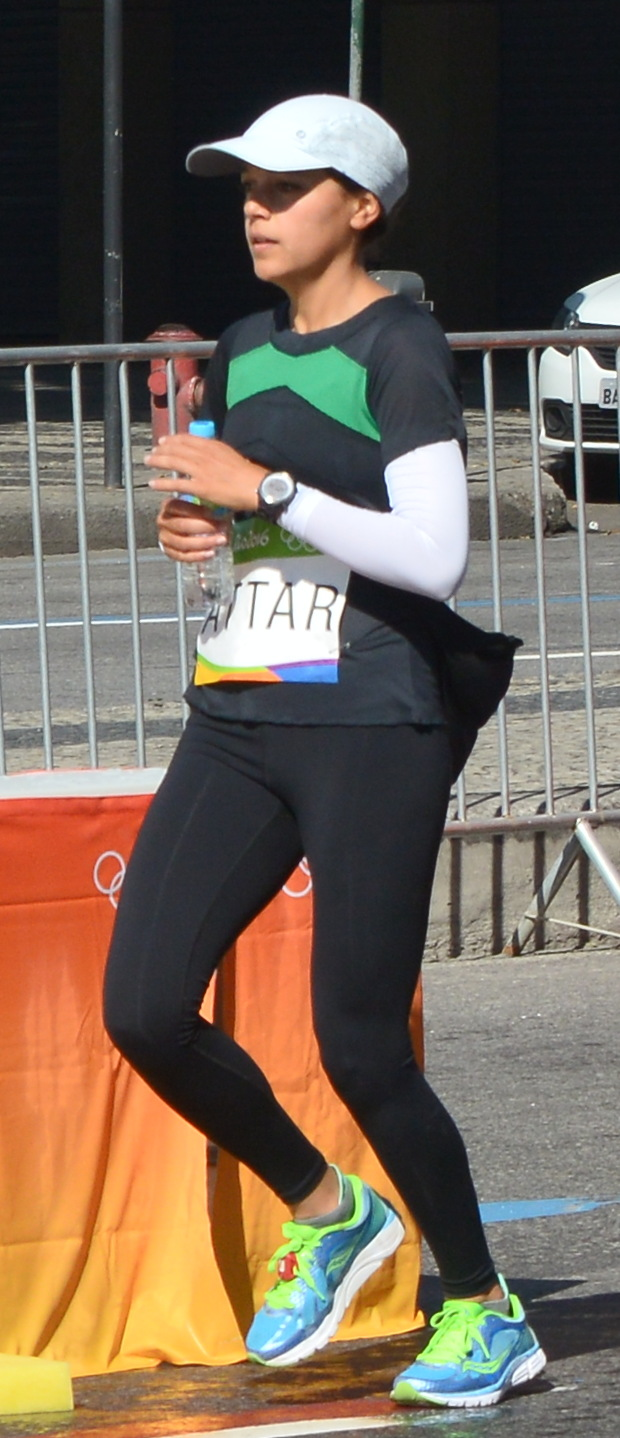
Sarah Attar competing at the 2012 Summer Olympics as one of the first two females representing Saudi Arabia

Scuba diving, windsurfing, sailing, and basketball are popular, with the Saudi Arabian national basketball team winning bronze at the 1999 Asian Championship. More traditional sports such as horse racing and camel racing are also popular. The annual King's Camel Race, which began in 1974, is one of the sport's most important contests and attracts animals and riders from throughout the region. Falconry is another traditional pursuit.

Women's sport is controversial because of the suppression of female participation in sport by conservative Islamic religious authorities, however the restrictions have eased. Until 2018 women were not permitted in sport stadiums. Segregated seating, allowing women to enter, has been developed in three stadiums across major cities. From 2020, women's sport has developed rapidly. Twenty-five Saudi sport federations have established a national women's team, including a national football and basketball team. In November 2020, the Saudi Arabian Football Federation announced the launch of the first nationwide Saudi women's premier league.

The nation has introduced many international sporting events. However, in August 2019, the kingdom received criticism for sportswashing soon after Saudi's US-based 2018 lobbying campaign foreign registration documentations was published online. The documents showed Saudi Arabia as allegedly implementing a sportswashing strategy, including meetings and official calls with authorities of associations like Major League Soccer, World Wrestling Entertainment, and the National Basketball Association.

== See also ==
- Outline of Saudi Arabia

== Bibliography ==
- Abir, Mordechai (1987). Saudi Arabia in the oil era: regime and elites : conflict and collaboration. Croom Helm. ISBN 978-0-7099-5129-2.
- Abir, Mordechai (1993). Saudi Arabia: Government, Society, and the Persian Gulf Crisis. Routledge. ISBN 978-0-415-09325-5.
- Al-Rasheed, Madawi (2010). A History of Saudi Arabia. Cambridge University Press. ISBN 978-0-521-74754-7.
- Bowen, Wayne H. (2007). The History of Saudi Arabia. Greenwood Press. ISBN 978-0-313-34012-3.
- Hegghammer, Thomas (2010). Jihad in Saudi Arabia: Violence and Pan-Islamism Since 1979. Cambridge University Press. ISBN 978-0-521-73236-9.
- House, Karen Elliott (2012). On Saudi Arabia: Its People, Past, Religion, Fault Lines—and Future. Alfred A. Knopf. ISBN 978-0-307-27216-4.
- Long, David E. (2005). Culture and Customs of Saudi Arabia. Bloomsbury Academic. ISBN 978-0-313-32021-7.
- Malbouisson, Cofie D. (2007). Focus on Islamic issues. Nova Publishers. ISBN 978-1-60021-204-8.
- Otto, Jan Michiel (2010). Sharia Incorporated: A Comparative Overview of the Legal Systems of Twelve Muslim Countries in Past and Present. Amsterdam University Press. ISBN 978-90-8728-057-4.
- Tripp, Harvey; North, Peter (2009). CultureShock! A Survival Guide to Customs and Etiquette. Saudi Arabia (3rd ed.). Marshall Cavendish.
- Tripp, Harvey; North, Peter (2003). Culture Shock, Saudi Arabia. A Guide to Customs and Etiquette. Singapore; Portland, Oregon: Times Media Private Limited.
