= Saudi National Day =

Public holiday in Saudi Arabia

Saudi National Day اليوم الوطني السعودي
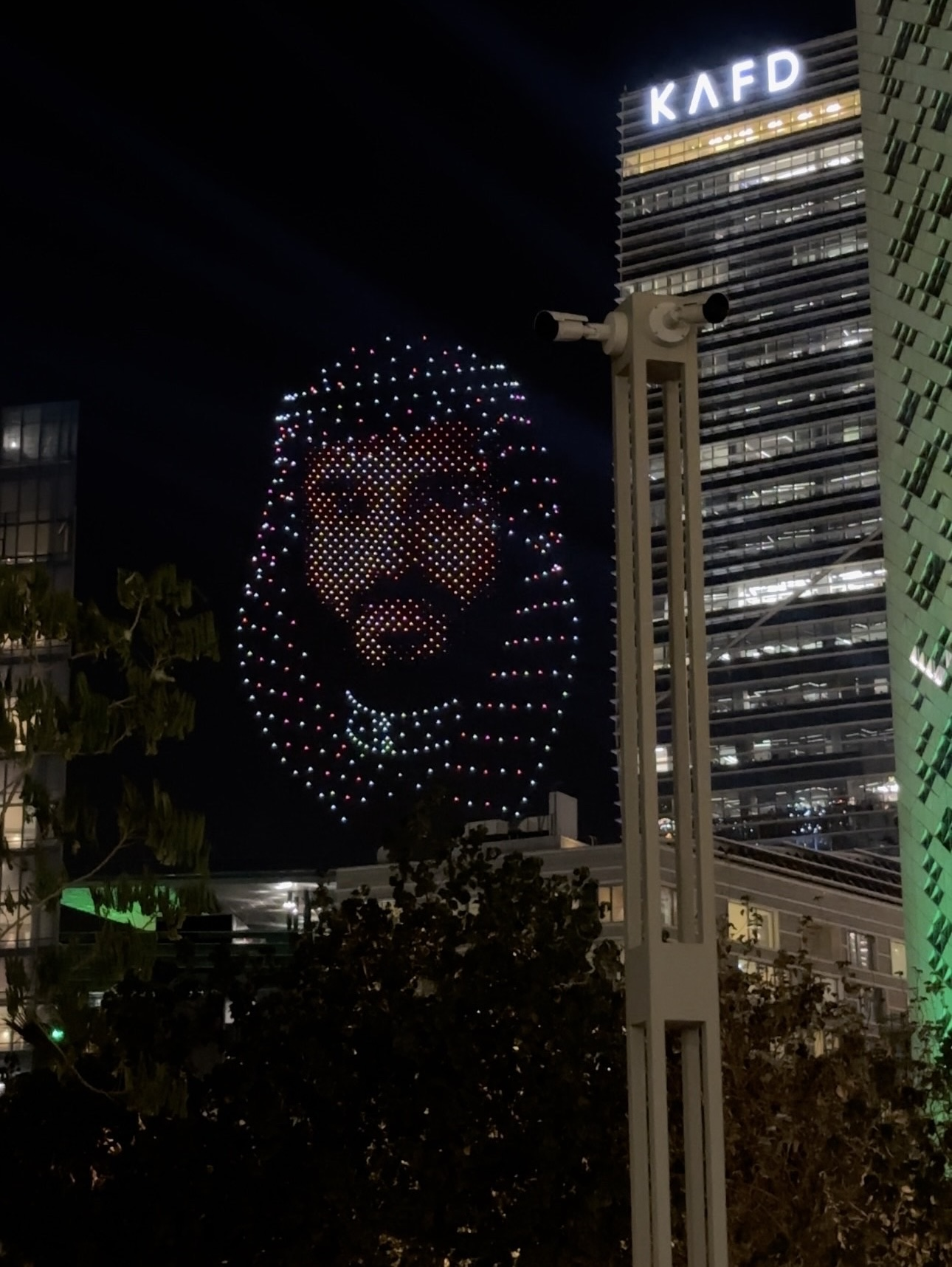
- Drone art of Saudi crown prince Mohammed bin Salman at KAFD during the 94th Saudi National Day celebrations, 2024
- Official name: Saudi National Day
- Observed by: Saudi Arabia
- Type: National
- Significance: Proclamation of the Kingdom of Saudi Arabia on 23 September 1932
- Ends: The day after
- Date: 23 September
- Next time: 23 September 2027
- Frequency: Annual
- First time: 1965; 61 years ago (at official levels); 2005; 21 years ago (as national holiday)
- Started by: King Faisal

The Saudi National Day (Note: Arabic: اليوم الوطني السعودي; Romanization: al-Yawm al-Waṭanī al-Suʿūdī) is an official public holiday in Saudi Arabia celebrated annually on 23 September. The holiday was established in 1965 by King Faisal to replace Royal Seating Day (1930–1963) while retaining its predecessor's historic year count, commemorating the official renaming and proclamation of the Kingdom of Hejaz and Nejd and Its Dependencies as the Kingdom of Saudi Arabia on 23 September 1932.

In 2005, it was designated as an official public holiday by King Abdullah. It stands as one of two non-religious public holidays in the country, alongside the Saudi Founding Day.

== History ==
From 1930 to 1963, the country observed Royal Seating Day (Accession Day). The date of the celebration varied depending on the reigning monarch's coronation date. It was initially observed on 8 January following the crowning of King Abdulaziz, before moving to 12 November after the accession of King Saud.

In August 1965, King Faisal issued a royal decree replacing Royal Seating Day with an official Saudi National Day. The change was intended to shift the focus of the holiday from the individual monarch's coronation to the state itself. King Faisal designated 23 September for the holiday to mark the date in 1932 when the Kingdom of Hejaz and Nejd and Its Dependencies was officially renamed and proclaimed as the Kingdom of Saudi Arabia. Despite the change in date and purpose, the holiday retained the annual numbering system of its predecessor, counting the inaugural 1930 Royal Seating Day as the first national day.

== Slogans ==
Saudi National Day Slogans (2018–present)
Year	Edition	Official Slogan (English)	Official Slogan (Arabic)	Significance and Theme Focus
2018	88th	For Glory and Prosperity	للمجد والعلياء	The slogan was sourced from the national anthem and marked the first use of an official slogan for Saudi National Day.
2019	89th	Mettle Until the Top	همة حتى القمة	Inspired by a quote from Crown Prince Mohammed bin Salman comparing Saudi determination to Mount Tuwaiq.
2020	90th	Mettle Until the Top	همة حتى القمة	Inspired by a quote from Crown Prince Mohammed bin Salman comparing Saudi determination to Mount Tuwaiq.
2021	91st	She Is a Home to Us	هي لنا دار	Highlighted national security, humanitarian initiatives, and community inclusion alongside structural housing and development programs.
2022	92nd	She Is a Home to Us	هي لنا دار	Highlighted national security, humanitarian initiatives, and community inclusion alongside structural housing and development programs.
2023	93rd	We Dream and We Achieve	نحلم ونحقق	Focused heavily on the global visibility and execution phase of giga-projects linked directly to Saudi Vision 2030.
2024	94th	We Dream and We Achieve	نحلم ونحقق	Focused heavily on the global visibility and execution phase of giga-projects linked directly to Saudi Vision 2030.
2025	95th	Our Pride Lies in Our Nature	عزّنا بطبعنا	Highlights Saudi Arabia’s landscapes, traditional hospitality, and cultural heritage, with branding elements such as the Ajrab sword.
2026	96th	Our Pride Lies in Our Nature	عزّنا بطبعنا	Highlights Saudi Arabia’s landscapes, traditional hospitality, and cultural heritage, with branding elements such as the Ajrab sword.

== Events ==
The following events occurred on 23 September across the history of Saudi Arabia:

- 1932 – King Abdulaziz issues a royal decree establishing the Kingdom of Saudi Arabia.
- 1963 – The College of Petroleum and Minerals (later King Fahd University of Petroleum and Minerals) is founded to advance technical education.
- 1965 – 23 September is observed for the first time as Saudi National Day, succeeding Royal Seating Day by order of King Faisal.
- 2007 – King Abdullah declares the national day an official public holiday.
- 2009 – King Abdullah officially inaugurates the King Abdullah University of Science and Technology (KAUST).
- 2014 – The Jeddah Flagpole is unveiled, holding the world record as the tallest flagpole from 2014 until 2021.
- 2015 – National Day celebrations are officially observed across all employment sectors due to regulatory updates.
- 2017 – Low-cost airline Flyadeal commences commercial flight operations.

== Gallery ==
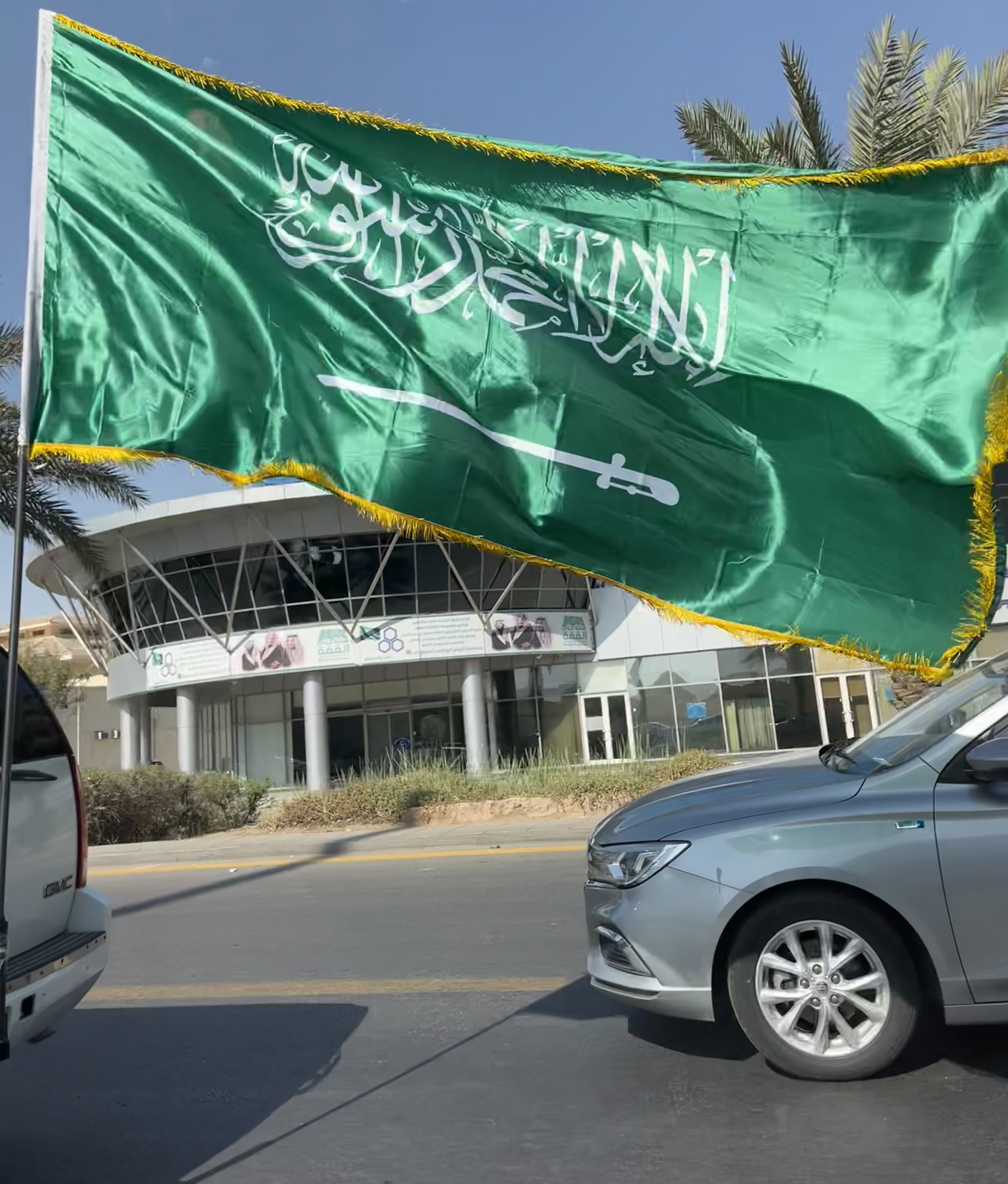
Saudi national flag mounted behind a Chevrolet Suburban, 2024

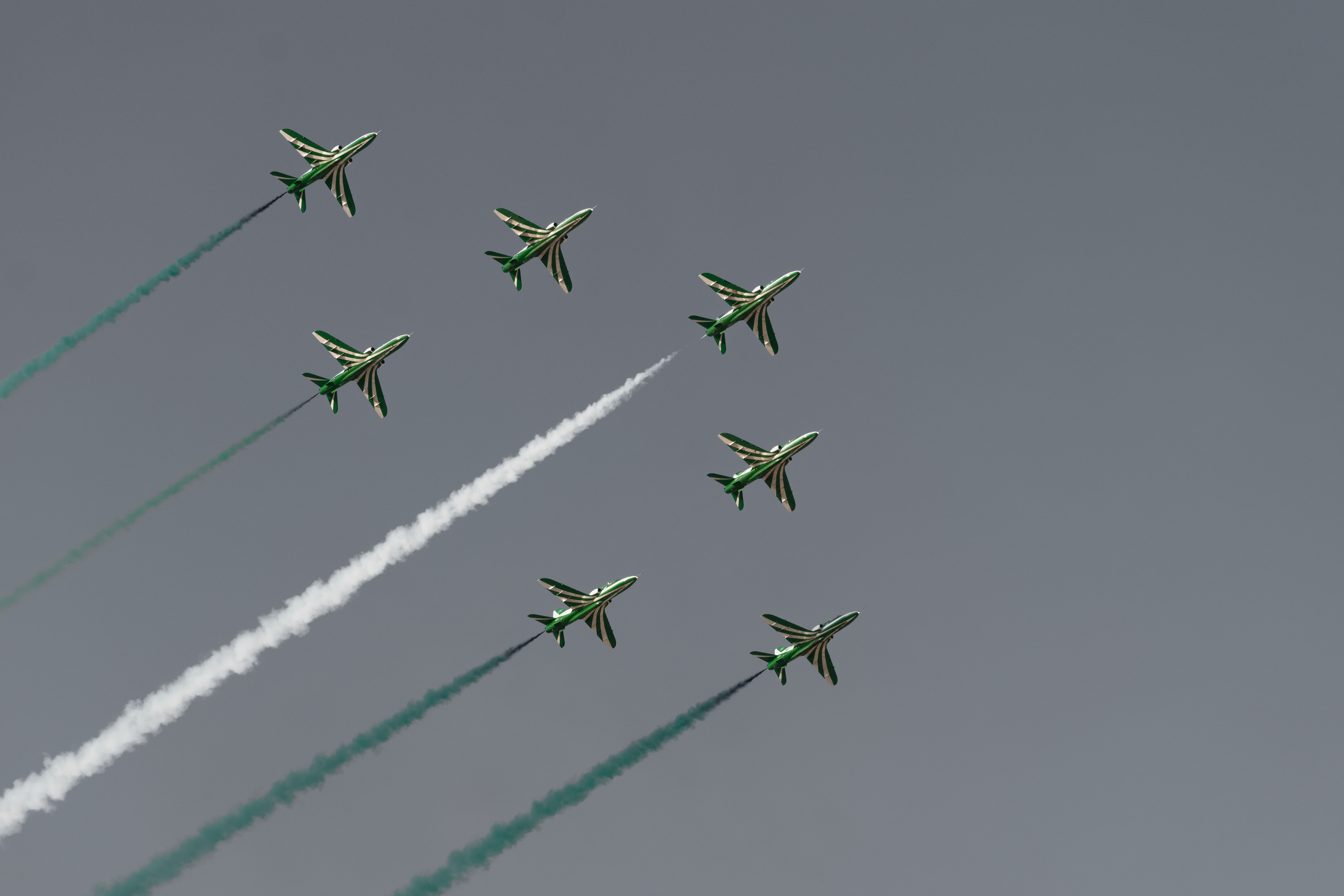
Saudi Falcons at an airshow, 2020

Olaya Towers lit in green, 2024

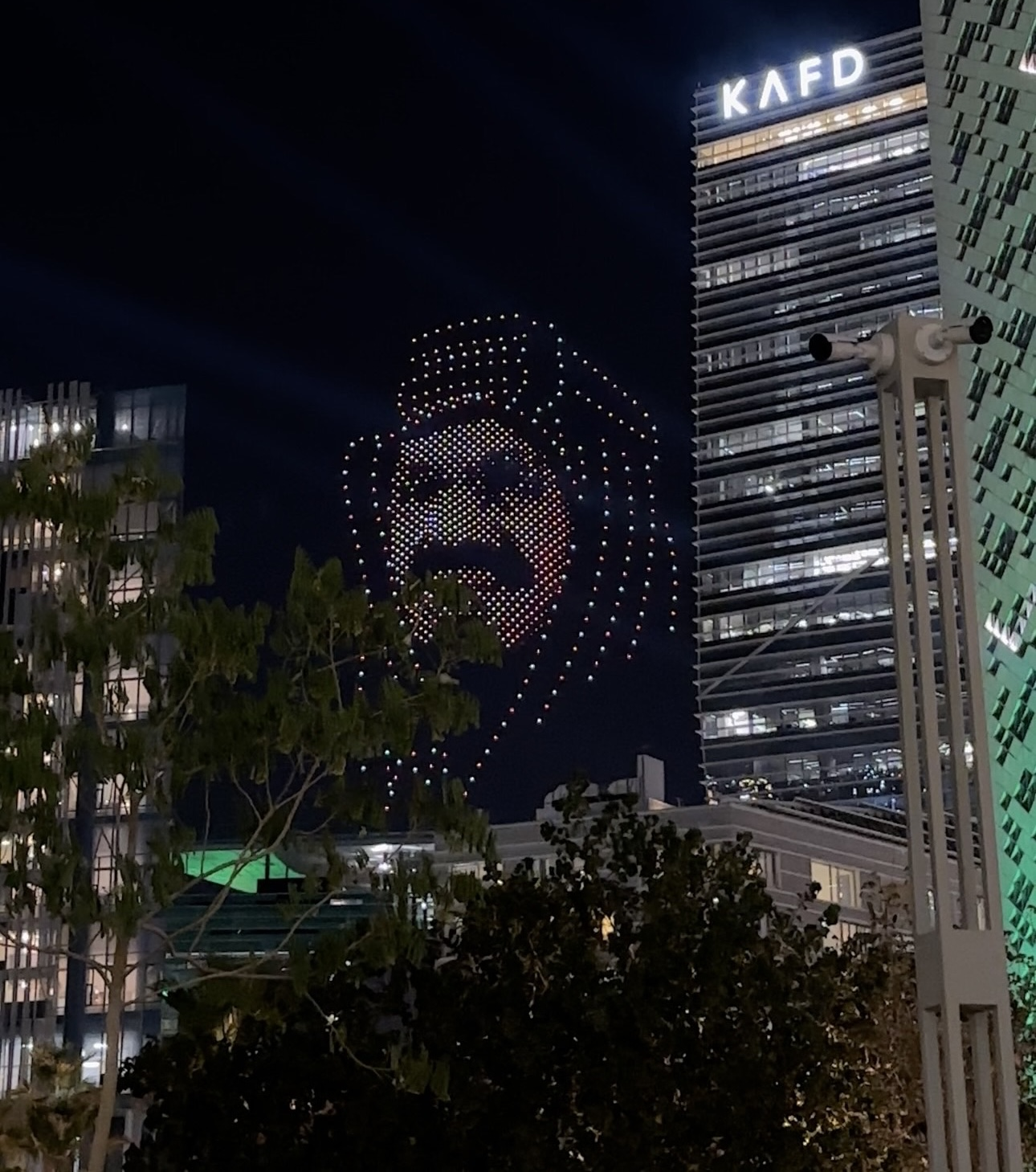
Drone art of King Abdulaziz at KAFD, 2024

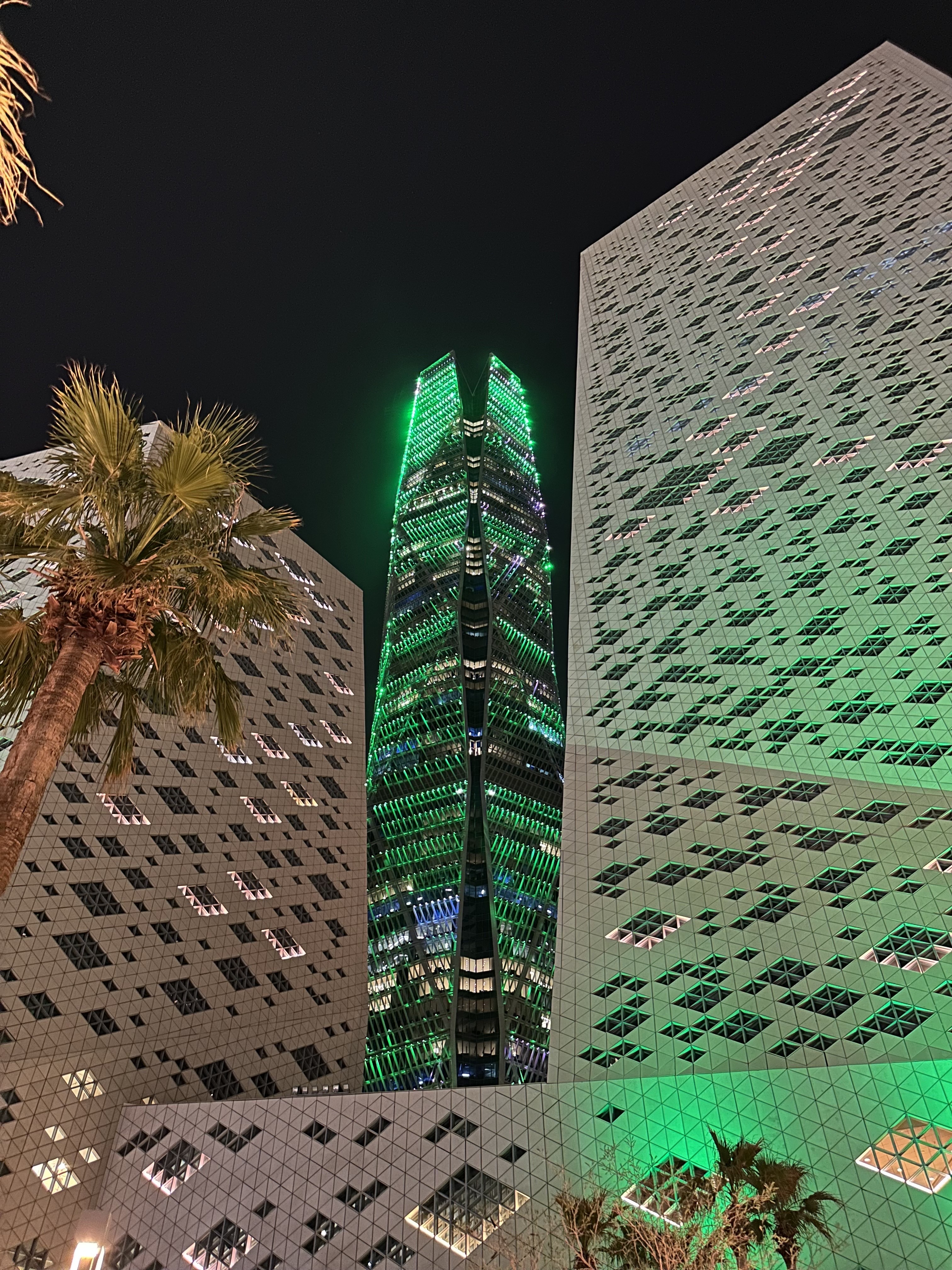
Public Investment Fund Tower in Riyadh lit in green, 2024

== See also ==
- Saudi Flag Day
- Royal Seating Day
- Flag of Saudi Arabia
- Public holidays in Saudi Arabia
- National Anthem of Saudi Arabia
