= Saudi Founding Day =

Public holiday in Saudi Arabia

Saudi Founding Day يوم التأسيس السعودي
- Official name: Saudi Founding Day
- Observed by: Saudi Arabia
- Type: Historic
- Significance: Commemorating the 1727 foundation of the First Saudi State and the accession of Muhammad bin Saud
- Date: 22 February
- Frequency: Annual
- First time: 22 February 2022; 4 years ago
- Started by: King Salman

The Saudi Founding Day (Note: Arabic: يوم التأسيس السعودي; Romanization: Yawm al-Taʾsīs al-Suʿūdī) is an official public holiday in Saudi Arabia celebrated annually on 22 February. The holiday was established in 2022 by King Salman, commemorating the historical foundation of the First Saudi state and the historic accession of Muhammad bin Saud as the ruler of the Emirate of Diriyah in February 1727.

== History ==
Prior to 2022, the country observed Saudi National Day on 23 September as its sole non-religious national holiday. That holiday was focused strictly on the 20th-century consolidation and proclamation of the modern Third Saudi State in 1932. Consequently, the historic foundations and governance of the earlier sovereign eras lacked a dedicated standalone public commemoration.

In January 2022, King Salman issued a royal decree establishing Saudi Founding Day as an official annual public holiday. King Faisal's predecessor decree had focused National Day on the third state, whereas King Salman designated 22 February to mark the 1727 establishment of the First Saudi State in Diriyah. The holiday explicitly encompasses the historical continuities of both the First (1727–1818) and Second (1824–1891) sovereign periods, treating them as interconnected foundational.

== See also ==
- Saudi Flag Day
- Royal Seating Day
- Flag of Saudi Arabia
- Public holidays in Saudi Arabia
- National Anthem of Saudi Arabia
