= Royal family =

Family of a monarch

A royal family is the immediate family of monarchs and sometimes their extended family.

The term imperial family appropriately describes the family of an emperor or empress, and the term papal family describes the family of a pope, while the terms baronial family, comital family, ducal family, archducal family, grand ducal family, or princely family are more appropriate to describe, respectively, the relatives of a reigning baron, count/earl, duke, archduke, grand duke, or prince.

However, in common parlance members of any family which reigns by hereditary right are often referred to as royalty or "royals". It is also customary in some circles to refer to the extended relations of a deposed monarch and their descendants as a royal family. A dynasty is sometimes referred to as the "House of ...". In July 2013 there were 26 active sovereign dynasties in the world that ruled or reigned over 43 monarchies.

== Members of a royal family ==
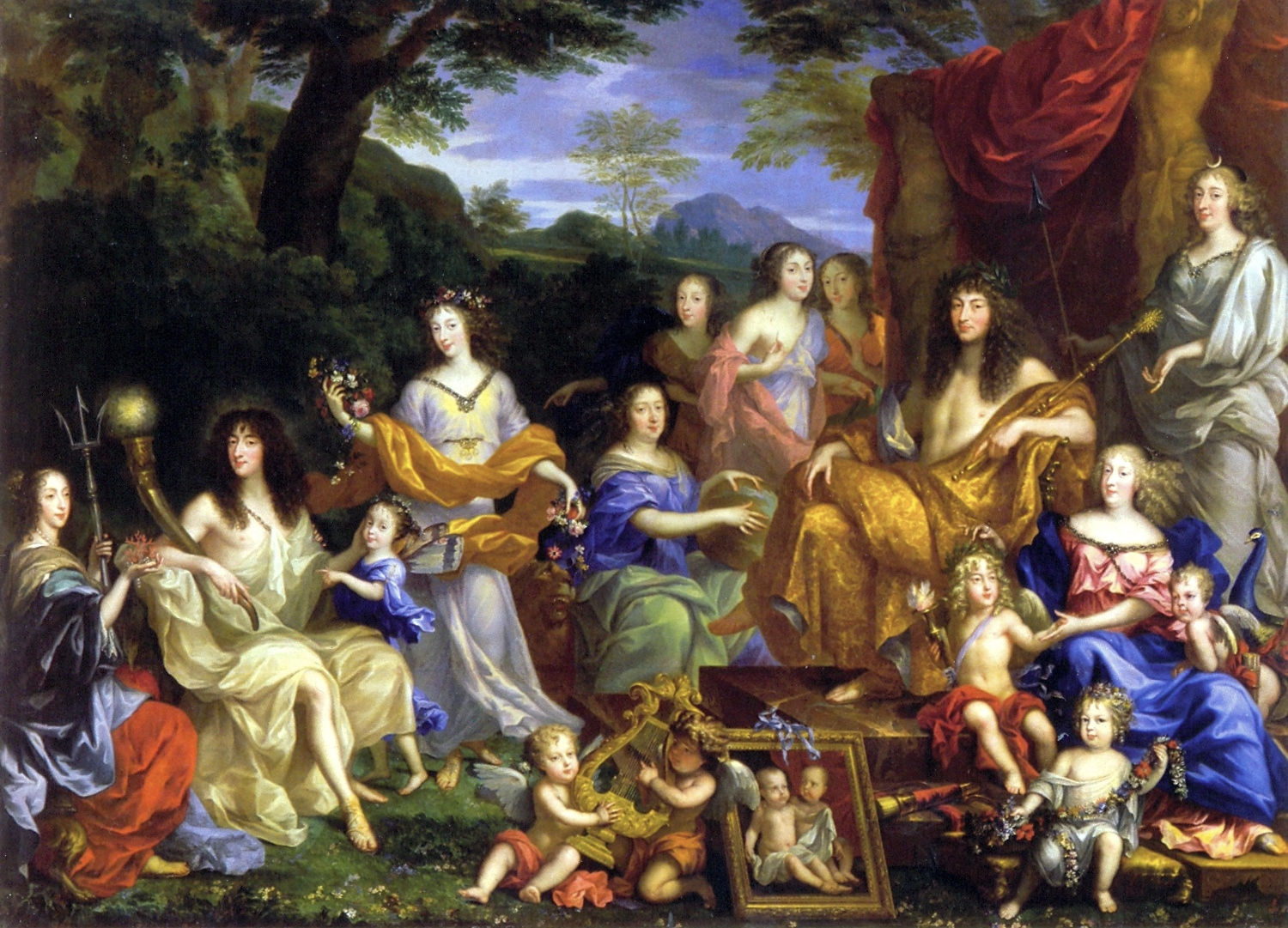
The Royal Family of France in classical costume during the reign of Louis XIV.

A royal family typically includes the spouse of the reigning monarch, surviving spouses of a deceased monarch, the children, grandchildren, brothers, sisters, and paternal cousins of the reigning monarch, as well as their spouses. In some cases, royal family membership may extend to great-grandchildren and more distant descendants of a monarch. In certain monarchies where voluntary abdication is the norm, such as the Netherlands, a royal family may also include one or more former monarchs. In certain instances, such as in Canada, the royal family is defined by who holds the styles Majesty and Royal Highness. There is often a distinction between persons of the blood royal and those that marry into the royal family. Under most systems, only persons in the first category are dynasts, that is, potential successors to the throne (unless the member of the latter category is also in line to the throne in their own right, a frequent occurrence in royal families which frequently intermarry). This is not always observed; some monarchies have operated by the principle of jure uxoris.

In addition, certain relatives of the monarch (by blood or marriage) possess special privileges and are subject to certain statutes, conventions, or special common law. The precise functions of a royal family vary depending on whether the polity in question is an absolute monarchy, a constitutional monarchy, or somewhere in between. In certain monarchies, such as that found in Saudi Arabia or Kuwait, or in political systems where the monarch actually exercises executive power, such as in Jordan, it is not uncommon for the members of a royal family to hold important government posts or military commands. In most constitutional monarchies, however, members of a royal family perform certain public, social, or ceremonial functions, but refrain from any involvement in electoral politics or the actual governance of the country.

The specific composition of royal families varies from country to country, as do the titles and royal and noble styles held by members of the family. The composition of the royal family may be regulated by statute enacted by the legislature (e.g., Spain, the Netherlands, and Japan since 1947), the sovereign's prerogative and common law tradition (e.g., the United Kingdom), or a private house law (e.g., Liechtenstein, the former ruling houses of Bavaria, Prussia, Hanover, etc.). Public statutes, constitutional provisions, or conventions may also regulate the marriages, names, and personal titles of royal family members. The members of a royal family may or may not have a surname or dynastic name (see Royal House).

In a constitutional monarchy, when the monarch dies, there is always a law or tradition of succession to the throne that either specifies a formula for identifying the precise order of succession among family members in line to the throne or specifies a process by which a family member is chosen to inherit the crown. Usually in the former case the exact line of hereditary succession among royal individuals may be identified at any given moment during prior reigns (e.g. United Kingdom, Sark, Nizari Ismailis, Japan, Balobedus, Sweden, Kingdom of Benin) whereas in the latter case the next sovereign may be selected (or changed) only during the reign or shortly after the demise of the immediately preceding monarch (e.g. Cambodia, KwaZulu Natal, Buganda, Saudi Arabia, Swaziland, Yorubaland, The Kingitanga). Some monarchies employ a mix of these selection processes (Malaysia, Monaco, Tonga, Jordan, Morocco), providing for both an identifiable line of succession as well as authority for the monarch, dynasty or other institution to alter the line in specific instances without changing the general law of succession.

Some countries have abolished royalty altogether, as in post-revolutionary France (1870), post-revolutionary Russia (1917), Portugal (1910), post-war Germany (1918), post-war Italy (1946) and many ex European colonies.

== Current royal families ==
=== Africa ===
- Lesotho royal family
- Moroccan royal family
- Swazi royal family
- List of current constituent African monarchs

=== Asia ===
- Bahraini royal family
- Bruneian royal family
- Bhutanese royal family
- Cambodian royal family
  - House of Norodom
  - House of Sisowath
- Emirati princely families
  - Abu Dhabi royal family
  - Ajman royal family
  - Dubai royal family
  - Fujairah royal family
  - Ras Al Khaimah royal family
  - Sharjah royal family
  - Umm Al Quwain royal family
- Japanese imperial family
- Jordanian royal family
- Kuwaiti princely family
- Malaysian royal families
  - Johor royal family
  - Kedah royal family
  - Kelantan royal family
  - Negeri Sembilan royal family
  - Pahang royal family
  - Perak royal family
  - Perlis royal family
  - Selangor royal family
  - Terengganu royal family
- Omani sultanic family
- Qatari princely family
- Saudi royal family
- Thai royal family
- List of current constituent Asian monarchs

=== Europe ===
- Belgian royal family
- British royal family
- Danish royal family
- Dutch royal family
- Liechtenstein princely family
- Luxembourg grand ducal family
- Monegasque princely family
- Norwegian royal family
- Spanish royal family
- Swedish royal family

=== Oceania ===
- Australian royal family
- New Zealand royal family
- Papuan royal family
- Solomon Islands royal family
- Tongan royal family
- Tuvaluan royal family

=== North America ===
- Antiguan royal family
- Bahamian royal family
- Belizean royal family
- Canadian royal family
- Grenadian royal family
- Jamaican royal family
- Saint Kitts and Nevis royal family
- Saint Lucian royal family
- Vincentian royal family

== Deposed royal families ==
=== Africa ===
- Central African imperial family
- Egyptian royal family
- Ethiopian imperial family
- Gambian royal family
- Ghanaian royal family
- Kenyan royal family
- Libyan royal family
- Malawian royal family
- Mauritian royal family
- Nigerian royal family
- Rwandan royal family
- Rhodesian (Zimbabwean) royal family
- Sierra Leonean royal family
- South African royal family
- Tanganykan (Tanzanian) royal family
- Tunisian royal family
- Ugandan royal family
- Umurundi royal family

=== Asia ===
- Afghan royal family
- Bengali royal family
- Burmese royal family
- Ceylonese (Sri Lankan) royal family
- Chinese imperial family
  - Royal Family of Tang Dynasty
  - Royal Family of Song Dynasty
  - Royal Family of Yuan Dynasty
  - Royal Family of Ming Dynasty
  - Royal Family of Qing Dynasty
- Indian imperial family
  - Baroda royal family
  - Royal family of Dhaka
  - Jaipur royal family
  - Jodhpur royal family
  - Udaipur royal family
  - Pataudi Family
  - Asaf Jahi dynasty
  - Sundem royal family
  - Pudukkottai royal family
  - Mysore royal family (Wadiyar dynasty)
  - Travancore royal family
  - Pillai-Pari family
- Iranian imperial family
- Iraqi royal family
- Korean imperial family
- Laotian royal family
- Maldivian sultanic family
- Nepalese royal family
- Ottoman (Turkish) imperial family
- Pakistani royal family
- Singaporean sultanic family
- Uzbek royal families
  - Khiva royal family
  - Bhukaran royal family
- Vietnamese imperial family
- Yemeni royal family

=== Europe ===
- Albanian royal family
- Austrian imperial family
- Bohemian (Czech) royal family
- Bulgarian royal family
- Croatian royal family
- Finnish royal family
- French imperial family
- Georgian royal family
- German imperial family
  - Bavarian royal family
  - Saxon royal family
  - Württemberg royal family
    - Baden grand ducal family
    - Hessian grand ducal family
    - Mecklenburg (Schwerin and Strelitz) grand ducal family
    - Oldenburg grand ducal family
    - Saxe-Weimar-Eisenach grand ducal family
      - Anhalt ducal family
      - Brunswick ducal family
      - Saxe-Coburg and Gotha ducal family
      - Saxe-Meiningen ducal family
        - Lippe-Detmold princely family
- Greek royal family
- Irish royal family
- Italian royal family
- Hungarian royal family
- Lithuanian royal family
- Maltese royal family
- Montenegrin royal family
- Polish royal family (Congress Poland)
- Portuguese royal family
- Romanian royal family
- Russian imperial family
- Serbian royal family

=== Oceania ===
- Fijian royal family
- Hawaiian royal family

=== North America ===
- Barbadian royal family
- Haitian imperial family
- Mexican imperial family
- Miskito royal family
- Trinidad and Tobago royal family

=== South America ===
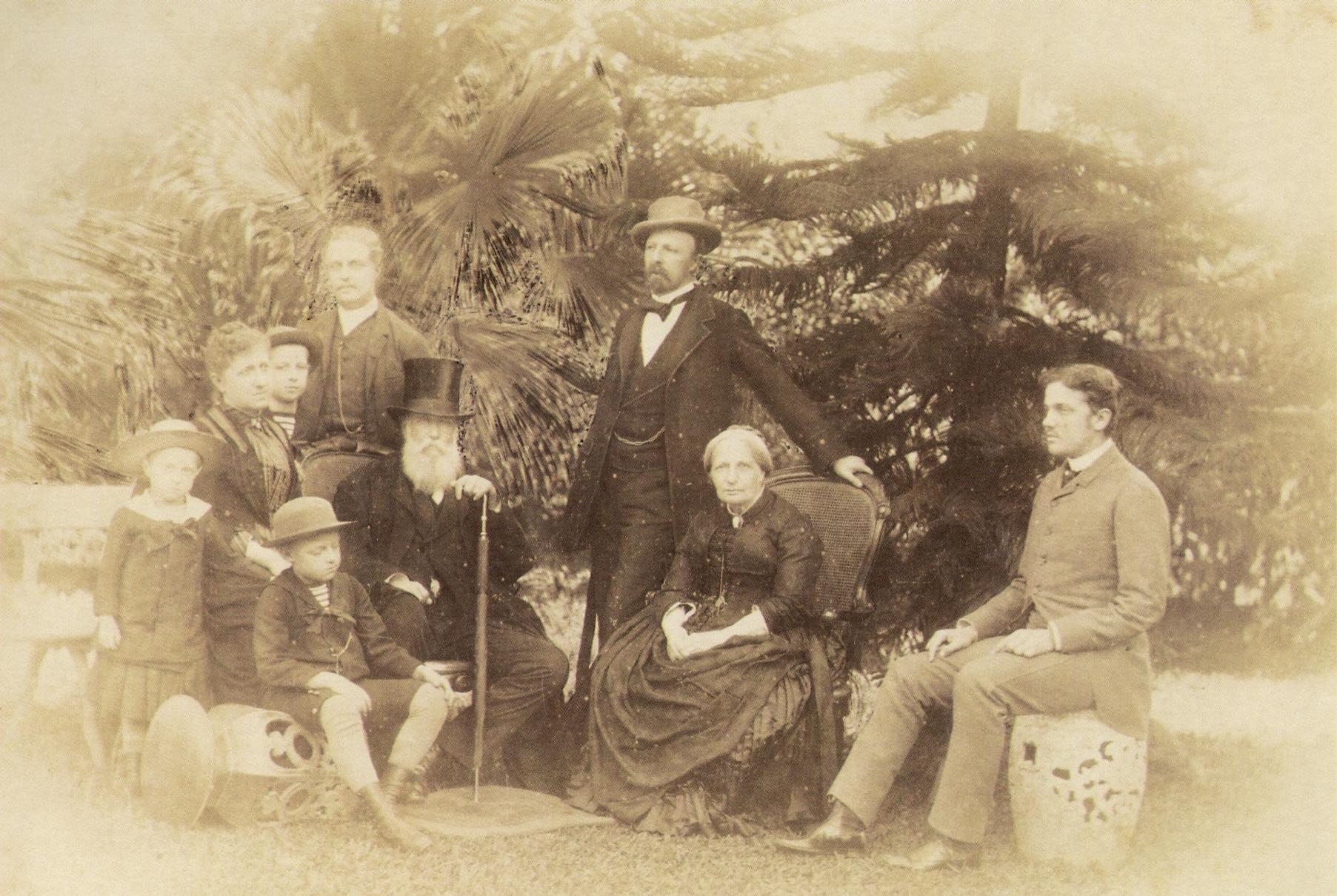
Emperor Pedro II of Brazil and other members of the Brazilian imperial family in Rio de Janeiro, 1887

- Brazilian imperial family
- Mask of Ferdinand VII context
  - Argentine royal family (United Provinces of the Río de la Plata)
  - Chilean royal family (Kingdom of Chile)
  - Colombian royal family (Free and Independent State of Cundinamarca)
  - Venezuelan royal family (Supreme Junta)
- Guyanese royal family

== Mediatised princely families ==
Whilst mediatization occurred in other countries such as France, Italy and Russia, only the certain houses within the former Holy Roman Empire are collectively called the Mediatized Houses.

- Arenberg ducal family (Belgium)
- Fürstenberg princely family (Germany)
- Ligne princely family (Belgium)
- Merode princely family (Belgium)
- Schwarzenberg princely family (Bohemia)
- Thurn und Taxis princely family (Germany)

== Dynasties ==
- House of Asturias-Cantabria
- Aberffraw House of Gwynedd
- Al-Abbasi
- Al Khalifa
- Al-Sabah
- Al-Falasi
- Al Ghardaqa
- Uyunid dynasty
- Alaouite dynasty
- Angevin dynasties
  - House of Ingelger
  - Angevin kings of England
  - Capetian House of Anjou
  - House of Valois-Anjou
- Artaxiad dynasty
  - Cadet branch in Georgia
- Arsacid dynasty
  - Cadet branch in Armenia
  - Cadet branch in Caucasian Albania
  - Cadet branch in Georgia
- Artsruni dynasty
- Sasanian dynasty
- House of Árpád
- House of Arslan (The Lakhmids)
- House of Aviz
- House of Bernadotte
- House of Bagrat
  - Bagratuni dynasty of Armenia
  - Bagrationi dynasty of Georgia
- Balti dynasty
- House of Blois
- House of Bonaparte
- Borjigid
- House of Bourbon
- House of Bokassa
- House of Orléans
- House of Bourbon-Parma
- House of Orléans-Braganza
- House of Braganza
- House of Capet
- Carolingian dynasty
- House of Coimbra
- Chakri dynasty (House of Mahidol)
- Dynasties of China
  - Xia dynasty
  - Shang dynasty
  - Zhou dynasty
  - Qin dynasty
  - Han dynasty
  - Jin dynasty
  - Sui dynasty
  - Tang dynasty
  - Liao dynasty
  - Song dynasty
  - Jin dynasty
  - Yuan dynasty
  - Ming dynasty
  - Qing dynasty
- Comnenian dynasty
- Cochin royal family
- Davidic line
- House of Dlamini
- Flavian dynasty
- Gediminids
- Ghassanids
  - Al-Chemor
- Giray dynasty
- House of Grimaldi
- House of Glücksburg
- House of Habsburg
  - House of Habsburg-Lorraine
- Rubenid dynasty
- Hethumid dynasty
- House of Hamengkubuwono
- House of Hanover
- Hashemite
- Hasmonean
- House of Hesse
- House of Hohenzollern
- Holstein-Gottorp-Romanov
- Dynasties of India
  - House of Bhonsle
  - Maurya Empire
  - Chalukya dynasty
  - Chola dynasty
  - Gupta dynasty
  - Kushan dynasty
  - Oiniwar dynasty (Maithil Brahmin) royal family
  - Mughal dynasty
  - Peshwa dynasty
  - Rajput dynasties
  - Nizam dynasty (Hyderabad)
  - Wadiyar dynasty (Mysore) royal family.
- Jagiellons
- Julio-Claudian dynasty
- House of Karađorđević
- Keita Dynasty
- Khun Lo dynasty
- Banū Khuzaʽah
- Hawaiian houses
  - House of Kalākaua
  - House of Kamehameha
  - House of Kawānanakoa
  - House of Laanui-Kalokuokamaile
- Irish houses
  - Ó Conchubhair Donn of Connacht
  - O'Neill dynasty of Ulster
  - O'Brien dynasty of Thomond
  - MacMurrough Kavanagh of Leinster
  - MacCarthy of Desmond
  - O'Rorke of Breifne
  - Eóganachta
- Dynasties of Korea
  - Unified Silla
  - Goryeo dynasty
  - Joseon dynasty (House of Yi)
- House of Lancaster
- House of Liechtenstein
- House of Lusignan
- Merovingian dynasty
- Nayaks of Kandy
- House of Nemanjić
- Muhammad Ali dynasty
- Nigerian houses
  - Ooduan royal family of Ife, Egba, Ketu, Sabe, Oyo, Ijero and the Ilas
    - Ado royal family of Lagos
    - Eweka royal family of Benin
    - Omoremilekun Asodeboyede royal family of Akure
- House of Normandy
- House of Norodom
- House of Obrenović
- House of Oldenburg
- Omrides
- House of Holstein-Gottorp
  - Schleswig-Holstein-Sonderburg-Glücksburg (elder line)
- House of Orange-Nassau
- House of Pakubuwono
- Ottoman dynasty
- Pahlavi dynasty
- Palaiologan dynasty
- Piast dynasty
- House of Plantagenet
- Přemyslid dynasty
- Qajar dynasty
- Timurid dynasty
- Romanov (Holstein-Gottorp-und-Romanov)
- Rurik dynasty
- Safavid dynasty
- House of Saud (Saudis)
- House of Savoy
- House of Saxe-Coburg and Gotha
- Solomonic dynasty
- House of Stuart
- House of Sisowath
- House of Trastámara
- Travancore royal family
- Trần dynasty
- House of Tudor
- Uí Ímair
- Uí Néill
- House of Vasa
- House of Windsor
  - Mountbatten-Windsor
- House of Wittelsbach
- House of York
- Yax Kuk Mo Dynasty
- Zand dynasty
- House of Zogu
- House of Zhao
- House of Zhu
- The Senegambia (Senegal and the Gambia)
  - The Joof family
  - The Royal House of Boureh Gnilane Joof
  - The Royal House of Jogo Siga Joof
  - The Royal House of Semou Njekeh Joof
  - The Lamanic Class
  - The Guelowar dynasty
  - Serer royalty

== See also ==
- Abolished monarchy
- Babu (title)
- Born in the purple
- Chief of the Name
- Crown prince
- Divine right of kings
- Dynasty
- First Family (in some republican states)
- Family trees of royal families
- Nobility
- Palace
- Prince
- Prince consort
- Princeps
- Princess
- Rai (title)
- Raja
- Rana (title)
- Rani (disambiguation)
- Princess Royal
- Queen consort
- Regicide
- Royal and noble styles
- Royal court
- Royal descent
- Rao (Indian surname)
- Royal prerogative
