= 2027 in Saudi Arabia =

- Decades: 2000s; 2010s; 2020s; 2030s
- See also: Other events of 2027; History of Saudi Arabia

Events in the year 2027 in Saudi Arabia.

== Events ==
=== Predicted and scheduled events ===
- 7 January–5 February – 2027 AFC Asian Cup
- 2 August – Solar eclipse of August 2, 2027 (total eclipse)
- TBA –
  - WrestleMania 43
  - 2027 Arab Games in Riyadh

== See also ==
- Saudi Arabia
- History of Saudi Arabia
- Outline of Saudi Arabia
