= The International Opera Festival =

Annual music festival held in Riyadh, Saudi Arabia

The International Opera Festival is an annual music festival held in the Saudi capital, Riyadh. Organized by the Music Commission under the Ministry of Culture, it provides a platform for opera performances by global artists to celebrate opera, attract opera lovers, and encourage cultural exchange with countries worldwide.

== First edition ==
The first edition took place over three nights in June 2022 at the Abu Baker Salem Stage at Boulevard City in Riyadh, with participating singers and artists including Sawsan Albahiti and Khayran Alzahrani. The festival also featured a special exhibition on classical art, showcasing items such as costumes and props, as well as information about the history of opera, its instruments, and other major opera houses around the world.

== Second edition ==
The second edition took place in November 2023, again over three nights, at the Red Theater, part of Princess Nourah bint Abdulrahman University in Riyadh. This time, world-renowned opera singers performed alongside the World Philharmonic Orchestra. As part of the festival, there was an exhibition celebrating the Italian director Franco Zeffirelli.
