= National anthem of SA =

National anthem of SA or SA national anthem may refer to:

- "National Anthem of Saudi Arabia"
- National anthem of South Africa
