= 2022 in Saudi Arabia =

- Decades: 2000s; 2010s; 2020s; 2030s
- See also: Other events of 2022; History of Saudi Arabia

Events in the year 2022 in Saudi Arabia.

== Incumbents ==
Photo	Post	Name
	King of Saudi Arabia	Salman of Saudi Arabia
	Crown Prince of Saudi Arabia	Mohammad bin Salman

== Events ==
Ongoing — COVID-19 pandemic in Saudi Arabia

- 4 January – A blast hits a vehicle for the Sodicars Racing team as it leaves a hotel in Jeddah, two days prior to the Dakar Rally, critically injuring French driver Philippe Boutron, who is in a medically induced coma.
- 12 January – Saudi Arabia reports a record 5,362 new cases of COVID-19 in the past 24 hours, bringing the nationwide total of confirmed cases to 593,545.
- 21 January – A Royal Saudi Air Force airstrike on a prison in Saada, Yemen, kills at least 100 people and injures more than 200 others. Médecins Sans Frontières reports over 200 casualties. The United Nations condemns the attack.
- 24 January – The United Arab Emirates Armed Forces intercepts two ballistic missiles over the Emirati capital Abu Dhabi. The Yemen-based Houthis claim responsibility for the attack. American troops stationed at Al Dhafra Air Base near the capital take shelter in bunkers during the attack.
- 10 February – An airstrike on Abha International Airport in the Saudi Arabian city of Abha injures twelve people. The attack was done by members of the Houthi movement.
- 14 February – The Saudi-led coalition airstrikes Sanaa, Yemen, in retaliation for an attack by Houthi forces on the Saudi Arabian city of Abha. A Houthi communications system used to command drones is destroyed.
- 3 March – Saudi Crown Prince Mohammed bin Salman says that his country will continue talks with regional rival Iran in order to reach an agreement between the two countries. Bin Salman also reaffirms his support for a "strong" nuclear deal that would prevent Iran from acquiring nuclear weapons.
- 5 March – Saudi Arabia will lift its COVID-19 restrictions, including PCR COVID-19 testing requirements, along with requirements for travelers to quarantine.
- 11 March – Saudi Arabian blogger Raif Badawi is released after spending a decade in prison.
- 12 March – Saudi Arabia executes 81 people, making it the largest execution in Saudi Arabian history, surpassing a January 1980 mass execution of 63 militants who were convicted of attempting to seize the Masjid al-Haram in Mecca.
- 21 March – The Shia Islamist Houthis fire missiles at an ARAMCO facility in Jeddah.
- 25 March – Houthi rebels launch 16 missile and drone attacks on Saudi Arabian cities. An airstrike also hits an ARAMCO facility in Jeddah, setting fire to an oil storage facility near a Formula One racing track where drivers were preparing for the 2022 Saudi Arabian Grand Prix.
- 26 March – The Saudi coalition in Yemen launches a series of air raids on targets in Yemen in response to attacks on Saudi Arabian energy facilities by the Houthis.
- 29 March – The Saudi-led military coalition suspends all military activity in Yemen.
- 1 April – The Saudi-led coalition and the Houthis agree to a UN-brokered nationwide truce, the first in years, for two months to mark the start of Ramadan. As part of the deal, fuel shipments will be allowed to enter the Houthi-controlled port of Al Hudaydah and commercial flights will resume in the capital of Sanaa.
- 2 April – Ceasefire talks between the Houthis and Saudi Arabian forces begin in Yemen in an effort to end fighting.
- 9 April – The Ministry of Hajj and Umrah announces that Saudi Arabia will lift their COVID-19 restrictions on the hajj and will allow 1 million people to participate in the event for the first time since 2019.
- 15 July – U.S. President Joe Biden meets with Saudi Arabian Crown Prince Mohammed bin Salman in Jeddah despite previously vowing to make him a "pariah".
- 9 August – Salma al-Shehab is sentenced to 34 years in prison for following and retweeting dissidents on Twitter.
- 16 August – Nourah al-Qahtani is sentenced to 45 years in prison for her social media posts.
- 24 November – 2022 Saudi Arabia floods.

== Deaths ==
- 5 January – Saleh Al-Luhaidan, 89, Islamic scholar
- 29 July – Mamoun Hassan, 84, screenwriter (The Good Life, Machuca), director and producer (No Surrender)

== See also ==
- Saudi Arabia
- History of Saudi Arabia
- Outline of Saudi Arabia
