= 2009 Jeddah floods =

2009 natural disaster in Jeddah, Saudi Arabia

Coordinates: 21°30′N 39°11′E

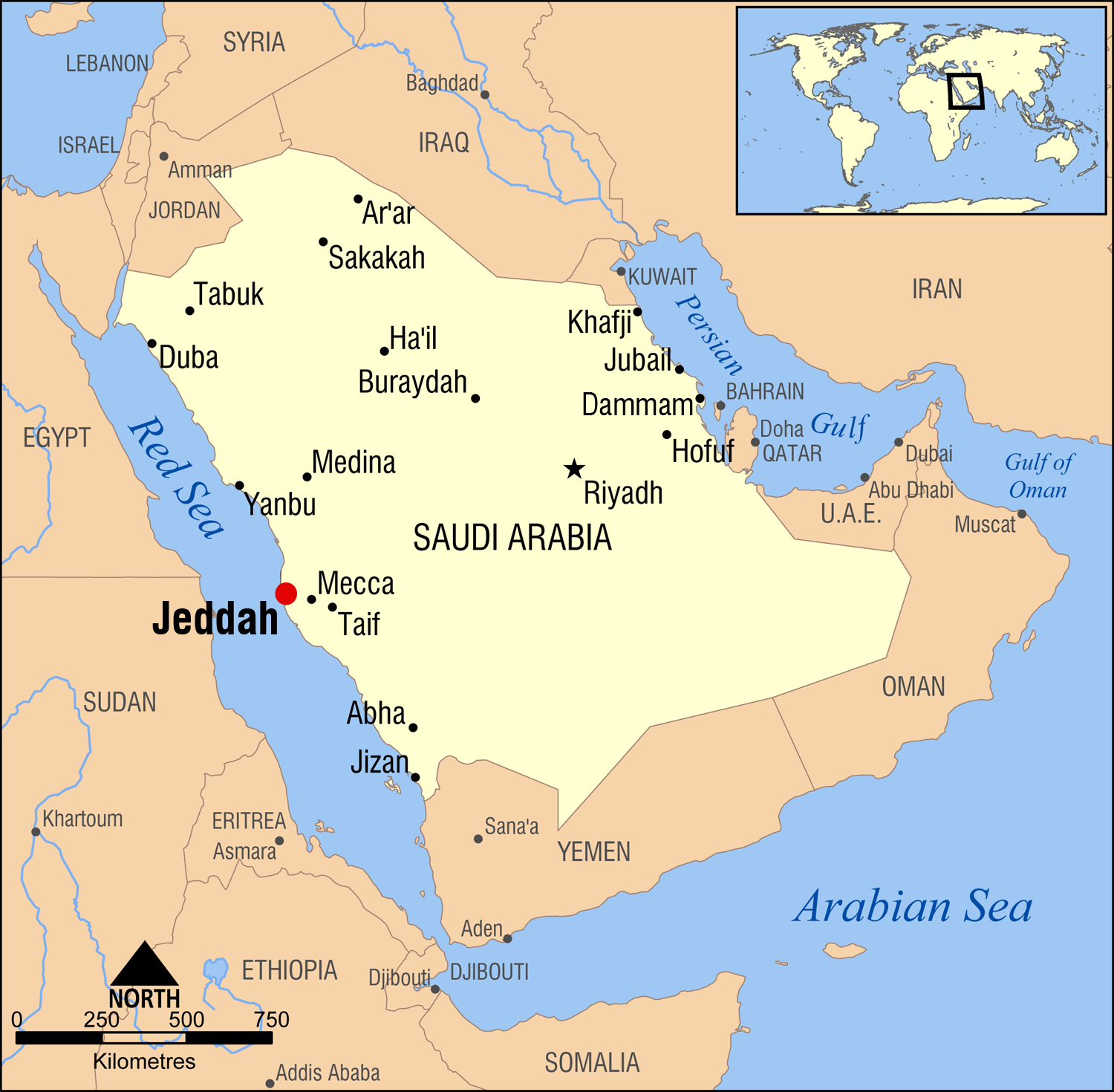
- The location of Jeddah within Saudi Arabia and the Arabian Peninsula.

Meteorological history
- Duration: 25 November 2009

Overall effects
- Fatalities: 122 (more than 350 missing)
- Damage: ر.س 1 billion
- Areas affected: Jeddah and other areas of Makkah Province

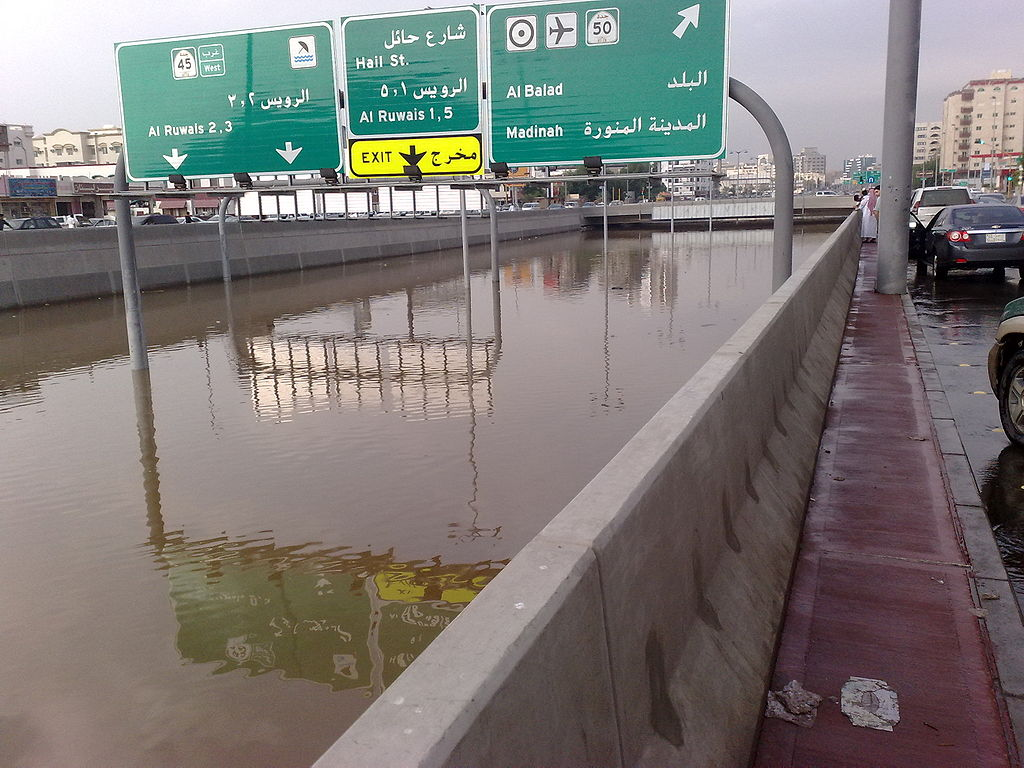
Tunnel in King Abdullah Street (Jeddah-Saudi Arabia)

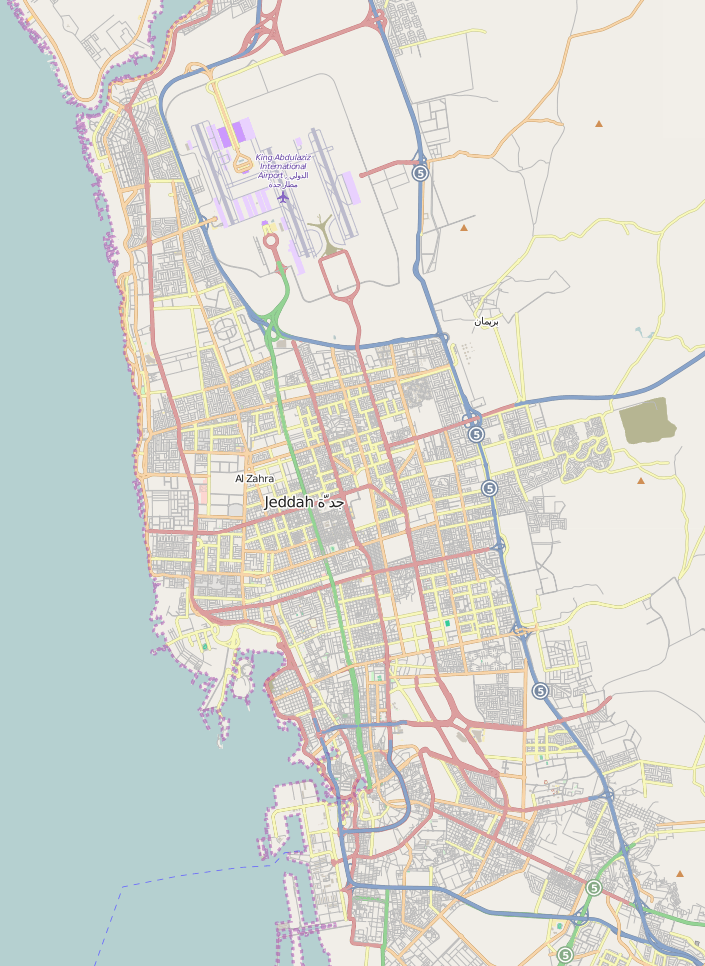
The city of Jeddah, with King Abdulaziz International Airport to the north. The main highways to Mecca run to the southeast. Map scale: approx. 25 kilometres (16 mi) from north to south.

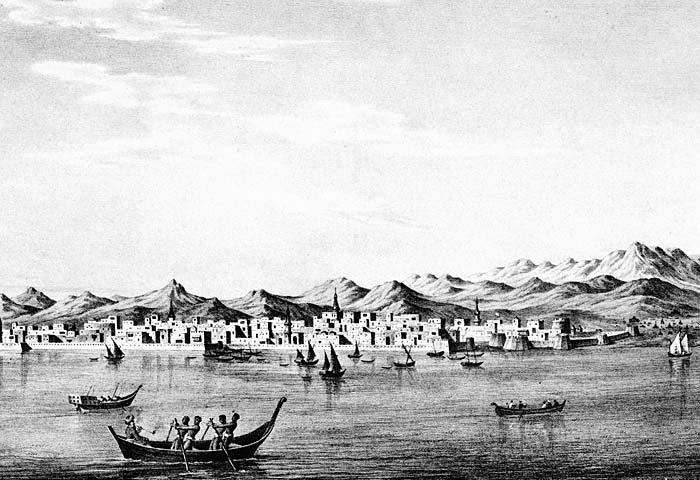
An engraving of Jeddah from 1924, showing the Jabal al Hejaz mountains behind the city.

The 2009 Saudi Arabian floods affected Jeddah, on the Red Sea (western) coast of Saudi Arabia, and other areas of Makkah Province. They have been described by civil defence officials as the worst in 27 years. As of 3 January 2010, some 122 people had been reported to have been killed, and more than 350 were missing. Some roads were under a meter (three feet) of water on 26 November, and many of the victims were believed to have drowned in their cars. At least 3,000 vehicles were swept away or damaged. The death toll was expected to rise as flood waters receded, allowing rescuers to reach stranded vehicles.

More than 70 millimetres (2.76 inches) of rain fell in Jeddah in just four hours on 25 November. This is nearly twice the average for an entire year and the heaviest rainfall in Saudi Arabia in a decade. The flooding came just two days before the expected date of the Eid al-Adha festival and during the annual Hajj pilgrimage to nearby Mecca. Business losses were estimated at a billion riyals (US$270 million). The poorer neighbourhoods in the south of Jeddah were particularly hard hit, as was the area around King Abdulaziz University. The university was closed for vacation at the time of the floods, preventing even higher casualties.

== Geography and hydrology of Jeddah ==
The city of Jeddah is situated on the Red Sea coast, beneath the northern escarpment of the Red Sea Rift known as the Jabal al Hejaz, which reaches 600 to 1,000 metres (2,000 to 3,300 ft) in the region. The population of the city is about 3.4 million (2009 estimate) in an urban area of 1,765 km^{2} (681 sq mi), giving a population density of 1,900 inhabitants per square kilometre (4,900/sq mi). The climate is arid, with most rainfall occurring between November and January, usually as thunderstorms.

Average monthly rainfall (1951–1983) in Jeddah in millimetres (inches)
Jan	Feb	Mar	Apr	May	Jun	Jul	Aug	Sep	Oct	Nov	Dec
11.2 (0.4)	4.5 (0.2)	4.2 (0.2)	1.0 (0.0)	0.9 (0.0)	0.0 (0.0)	0.1 (0.0)	0.0 (0.0)	0.1 (0.0)	0.6 (0.0)	18.2 (0.7)	16.2 (0.6)
Total: 56.1 mm (2.2 in.). Source: Global Historical Climatology Network, version 1

At least eleven wadis converge on the city, and localised flooding is common after rain. The municipality is currently investing 1 billion riyals (US$270 million) in storm drains, but the cost of a full system is estimated at an additional 3 billion riyals (US$800 million). In November 2009, only some 30% of the city was protected against flash flooding and then, often with only one-inch (25-millimetre) pipes.

== 2009 Hajj pilgrimage ==
25 November was the first day of the annual four-day Hajj pilgrimage to Islamic holy sites in and around Mecca, for which Jeddah is the main entry point for foreign pilgrims arriving by air or sea. The number of foreigners, as well as Saudi citizens, was slightly lower than in previous years, possibly because of health fears due to the pandemic of H1N1 influenza. However, over 1.6 million are still believed to have made the hajj, with 200,000 coming from Indonesia alone.

According to the Saudi Interior Ministry, none of the flood victims were taking part in the pilgrimage. However, the main Haramain expressway between King Abdulaziz International Airport and Mecca was closed on 25 November, stranding thousands of pilgrims. Parts of the 80-kilometre (50 mi) highway were reported to have caved in, and the Jamia bridge in eastern Jeddah partially collapsed. The highway remained closed on 26 November amid fears that the bridge would collapse completely.

Rain was unusually heavy in Mecca on 25 November, as well as in nearby Mina, where many pilgrims stay in vast tent cities. The weather had improved by 26 November, and pilgrims had to face "scorching heat" on the plain of Mount Arafat for the second day of the Hajj. Hassan Al-Bushra, an epidemiologist at the Cairo office of the World Health Organization, said "there is no evidence" that the rain would worsen the spread of the H1N1 flu virus, a view shared by the U.S. Centers for Disease Control and Prevention (CDC).

The Hajj rituals continued after the weather improved on 26 November 2009, but the Haramain Expressway was still being cleared on 28 November as authorities removed damaged vehicles ahead of pilgrims’ return journeys.

== See also ==
- 2022 Saudi Arabia floods, also hit Jeddah
