= Succession to the Saudi Arabian throne =

Order of succession in Saudi Arabia

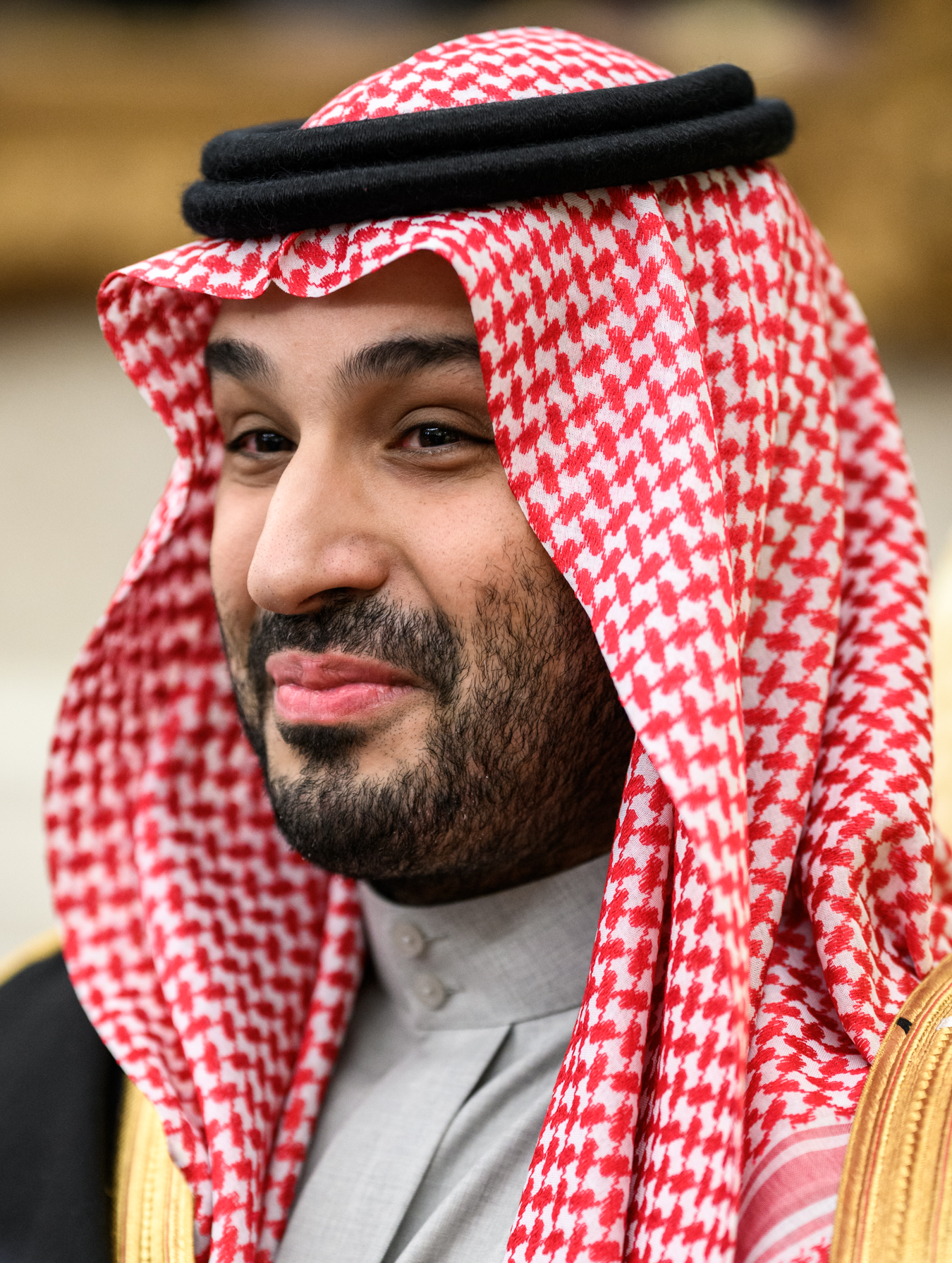
The Crown Prince of Saudi Arabia, Mohammed bin Salman Al Saud

The order of succession to the Saudi Arabian throne is determined by, and within, the House of Saud. Every King of Saudi Arabia, upon his death, has been succeeded by the crown prince, with a new crown prince then being appointed according to a loose form of agnatic seniority among the sons of Ibn Saud, though various members of the family have been bypassed for various reasons. A deputy crown prince (second in line for the throne) was first selected in 2014.

The accession of the monarch to the throne was observed as Royal Seating Day at official levels until 1963, when it was replaced by the Saudi National Day during the reign of King Faisal bin Abdulaziz.

The current ruler of Saudi Arabia is King Salman, who succeeded King Abdullah on his death on 23 January 2015. On the same day, Prince Muqrin became Crown Prince only to be replaced three months later by Muhammad bin Nayef at the order of Salman.

On the morning of 21 June 2017, Muhammad bin Nayef was deposed as Crown Prince and Salman's son Mohammad bin Salman was appointed to the position. The current crown prince is a grandson of Ibn Saud, the second of his generation to be officially placed first in the line of succession. The Allegiance Council was created in 2006 to facilitate the royal transfer of power.

== History ==
=== Abdulaziz "Ibn Saud" ===
The House of Saud controlled vast parts of the Arabian peninsula for two and a half centuries. The dynasty collapsed twice in the 1800s due to discord over succession. In the 1890s, the Al Sauds were completely supplanted by the Al Rashid. The kingdom began to fight to restore itself through Emir Abdulaziz bin Abdul Rahman, known to the world as "Ibn Saud", and his capture of Riyadh in 1902. After much tumult, Saudi Arabia became a kingdom in 1932.

As Ibn Saud conquered Arabia, he formed alliances through polygamous marriages with members of its biggest tribes. This strengthened his power within the Al Sauds and expanded his legitimacy in Arabia, not to mention nearly a hundred children, sixty of whom were boys. He died in 1953.

=== The question of succession in Arabia: 1920–1953 ===
When Ibn Saud first began the reconquest of his kingdom, he had a son named Turki, who was considered his likely heir, but he died during the great influenza epidemic of 1918–19, leaving a pregnant wife behind. It was unthinkable to have a baby as heir to a kingdom that was patently unstable, as the Emirate of Najd was in 1920. The Emir decided to leave the question open.

In the late 1920s and early 30s, Ibn Saud's brother Muhammad bin Abdul Rahman began to argue with him as to who would be next in line, Ibn Saud's second son Saud or Muhammad's own son Khalid bin Muhammad. In 1933, the king made his choice, and Prince Saud was declared Crown Prince.

Late in life, King ibn Saud declared that he wished that the Saudi succession would be via agnatic seniority and that Saud's heir presumptive would be his third, and more capable son, Faisal. Accordingly, when the old king died in 1953, Saud became king and Faisal was immediately declared Crown prince.

=== Saud vs. Faisal ===
For the eleven years of his reign, the question of who was to succeed King Saud was considered a "done deal". However, as the war between the King and Crown Prince grew more heated in the early 1960s, the King let it be known that he was considering changing the line of succession from agnatic seniority to agnatic primogeniture and naming his eldest son Crown Prince. This was unacceptable to the rest of the Royal Clan. At Faisal's request, his brother Muhammad bin Abdulaziz (Ibn Saud's fourth son) led a palace coup which ousted King Saud in late 1964.

=== The problem of Prince Mohammed ===
Faisal became the next king. Prince Mohammed served as Crown Prince from 1964 to 1965. Prince Mohammed was an intelligent and dynamic personality, leaving the possibility of another royal feud. During one of the times Faisal took over the government, he appointed his half brother Khalid (Ibn Saud's fifth son) as Deputy Prime Minister in 1962, bypassing Mohammed. Secret negotiations as to the conditions to which Mohammed would step aside would last well after the reign of Faisal had begun, and in 1965, Khalid became the new Crown Prince, in the process disinheriting two other princes, Nasser and Saad (Ibn Saud's sixth and seventh sons), who were deemed "unworthy".

=== Fahd and Abdullah ===
One of the reasons that Mohammed initially demured from standing down, was his distrust of the so-called Sudairi Seven, the sons of Ibn Saud's favorite wife. The eldest of the group, Prince Fahd (Ibn Saud's eighth son), had been Faisal's top choice. He was given the position of "second deputy Prime Minister" and at the same time, royal sources let it be known that Prince Abdullah (Ibn Saud's eleventh son), head of the National Guard, would be in line after him. They were the next two kings after Khalid, and between the two they reigned for thirty-three years.

=== Return of the Sudairis ===
In 1975 King Faisal was assassinated, and Crown Prince Khalid became the new king. When King Khalid's health began to decline rapidly, the problem of succession came back to the fore. Crown Prince Fahd (Ibn Saud's eighth son) wanted to pass over his brothers Princes Bandar and Musa'id (Ibn Saud's tenth and twelfth sons) for "heir to the heir". Prince Musa'id was in disgrace, his son having murdered King Faisal, but Bandar was a different matter.

For much of his life, Bandar had stayed away from government, preferring private business. However, he demanded his right to succession, and the Defense portfolio of Defense Minister Prince Sultan. He was asked to name his price for stepping aside and, seeing that his more powerful brothers were inimical to the idea of his accession, Bandar read the writing on the wall and accepted the offer of money. He is said to have named a high price, but the massive bribe, reputed to be in the tens of millions of USD (US$), was something the world's richest family could easily afford. Bandar accepted the money and yielded place to Prince Sultan.

After King Khalid's death, King Fahd became the new king, and reigned from 1982 to 2005. Fahd had initially wanted his full brother, Prince Sultan (Ibn Saud's fifteenth son), to become his heir. But upon his death he was succeeded by his half brother Abdullah (Ibn Saud's eleventh son). Abdullah ascended the throne on his 81st birthday, and Prince Sultan was automatically promoted to the position of crown prince. Most other surviving sons of Ibn Saud were elderly and bypassed.

Crown Prince Sultan convinced the King to appoint the next Sudairi, Nayef (Ibn Saud's twenty-third son), to the Second deputy spot. In 2011–12, both Sultan and Nayef died within months of each other, and a fourth Sudairi brother, Salman (Ibn Saud's twenty-fifth son), became crown prince on 18 June 2012.

== Allegiance Council ==
With the advancing ages of the sons of Ibn Saud (the youngest was born in 1945), King Abdullah created the Allegiance Council to address the shrinking number of candidates for the throne. It is composed of 28 persons: King Ibn Saud's sons, the eldest sons of the brothers who have died and the sons of King and Crown Prince. The council was led by Prince Mishaal.

=== Power of the Council ===
The purpose of the council is to ensure a smooth transition of power, and to designate future crown princes.

This, along with an earlier decree by King Fahd, opened the possibility of considering Abdul-Aziz's grandsons as viable candidates. Beyond age, the criteria for selection include:

- Support within the House of Saud
- Tenure in government
- Tribal affiliations and origins of a candidate's mother
- Religious persona
- Acceptance by the Ulema
- Support by the merchant community
- Popularity among the general Saudi citizenry.

The Council votes by secret ballot.

=== Influence of the Council ===
With the promotion of Crown Prince Sultan's three successors deemed automatic, and the King's writ on the subject of the appointment of the second deputy PM (the honorific "deputy crown prince" being much more recent than the position itself). The council has proved to be little more than a "rubber stamp."

==== Election of Prince Muqrin ====
After almost a year with the post of second deputy Prime Minister vacant. Prince Muqrin, the youngest son of Ibn Saud, was formally designated second deputy by royal decree in 2013. This meant that he was informally second in line, bypassing several senior princes. In order to make his place in the line of succession permanent and preclude any challenges by any of the dispossessed royals, King Abdullah polled each member of the Allegiance Council individually before announcing Muqrin's new title. The Allegiance Council met on 27 March 2014, for an official vote, which was 75% yes and 25% no.

==== Election of Prince Mohammed bin Nayef ====
As King Abdullah lay dying, a plot to change the line of succession was underway. It was said that Chief of the Royal Court Khaled al-Tuwaijri was conspiring with others to oust Crown Prince Salman and replace him with either Prince Muqrin or the King's son Prince Mit'eb.

Upon the death of King Abdullah on 23 January 2015, Salman ascended to the throne and Muqrin became crown prince. At the same time, Muhammad bin Nayef, the Interior Minister and a supporter of Salman's, was appointed deputy crown prince, an act that was ratified by the Allegiance Council after the fact. Muhammad bin Nayef was the first grandson of Ibn Saud to enter the official line of succession.

== Removal of Crown Prince Muqrin ==
Normally, the position of Crown Prince was an extremely powerful one, with Faisal, Fahd and Abdullah running the country on behalf of, or sometimes despite, their monarch. This was not the case of Crown Prince Muqrin, who was frozen out of King Salman's new double cabinet scheme and relegated to mostly ceremonial activities.

Instead, King Salman's son Mohammad had been showered with offices, including the Defense Ministry, the Secretaryship General of the Royal Court and Chairmanship of the Council of Economic and Development Affairs, leading some in the press to dub him the "king in training".

Muhammad bin Nayef, the Deputy Crown Prince as well as the Interior Minister, was also a Sudairi, and it was clear that without Muqrin, the clan would have a permanent grip on power. In the early morning hours of 29 April 2015, the king signed a decree deposing Crown Prince Muqrin, promoting Muhammad to crown prince and naming Mohammad bin Salman deputy crown prince. The following day, the Allegiance Council met and formally elected Mohammed by a vote of 28 to four with two abstentions.

== Removal of Crown Prince Muhammad bin Nayef ==
On the morning of 21 June 2017, state television announced that Muhammad bin Nayef had been removed as Crown Prince, and that Salman had elevated his son Mohammad bin Salman to the position. According to The New York Times, Muhammad bin Nayef was forced to abdicate and has since been under house arrest.
