= Maryam al-Otaibi =

Saudi Arabian human rights activist (born 1987)

- مريم العتيبي
- Born: 19 December 1987 (age 38); Ar Rass, al-Qassim Province, Saudi Arabia
- Relatives: Manahel al-Otaibi (sister); Fawzia al-Otaibi (sister)

Maryam al-Otaibi (Arabic: مريم العتيبي; born 19 December 1987), also spelled Mariam al-Otaibi and Mariem Aloteebi, is a Saudi Arabian human rights activist. Alongside her sisters Manahel and Fawzia, al-Otaibi became well known for her activism on social media, particularly against male guardianship laws, for which she served 104 days in detention in 2017.

== Personal life ==
Al-Otaibi was born and raised in al-Ras, al-Qassim Province, Saudi Arabia. Her sisters, Manahel and Fawzia, are also human rights activists; Manahel has been a prisoner in Saudi Arabia since 2022, while Fawzia fled the country that same year, settling in the United Kingdom.

As of 2022, al-Otaibi lives in Riyadh.

== Activism ==
Al-Otaibi rose to prominence for her activism on Twitter, which she used to promote the issue of women's rights in Saudi Arabia, particularly concerning Wali laws which meant that all women required a male guardian by law, including in adulthood. She took part in a social media campaign using the hashtag "#IAmMyOwnGuardian" and wrote letters to King Salman, in addition to signing and sharing petitions. Al-Otaibi initially tweeted using a pseudonym, but after Saudi authorities claimed that her account was fake, she became one of the first female Saudi activists to publicly identify themselves online.

=== 2017 arrest and detention ===
The Gulf Centre for Human Rights reported that male members of al-Otaibi's family did not support her activism. In 2017, she had contacted local police in al-Ras stating she had been the victim of domestic abuse from her brothers. Shortly afterwards, she attempted to move to Riyadh without the permission of her guardian in order to live independently, and accused the police in al-Ras of conspiring with her brothers, describing her life there as "hell". Al-Otaibi's father filed a complaint that she had done so without permission, leading to her being arrested on charges of disobedience on 18 April 2017 under the guardianship law. Al-Otaibi's arrest occurred a week after Dina Ali Lasloom attempted to flee Saudi Arabia, citing guardianship laws.

Al-Otaibi was detained for 104 days without trial at the women's wing of al-Malaz Prison in Riyadh before being released on 1 August 2017 after agreeing to drop the domestic abuse charges against her brothers, which in turn led to her father dropping the disobedience charge against her. Al-Otaibi became one of the first female detainees to be released from custody without the presence of a guardian, which Mona Eltahawy described as a "feminist victory". During her detention, al-Otaibi's sister Fowzia stated that the family had been subjected to a smear campaign on social media describing them as "traitors", causing Manahel to be diagnosed with multiple sclerosis.

=== Post-release ===
Following her release, al-Otaibi was made subject to a travel ban and was reportedly banned from speaking out publicly, though she did not know the ban was in place until she attempted to leave Saudi Arabia in 2022. That year, following unsuccessful complaints made to the Royal Court, Grievances Board, Human Rights Commission, Crown Prince's Office and the Emirate of Riyadh Province, al-Otaibi posted on social media about the lack of state accountability for alleged mistreatment she experienced while in detention. Following this, she was arrested and on 27 June 2022, sentenced by the Riyadh Criminal Court to a four-month suspended prison sentence, a 100, 000 SAR fine, and the confiscation of her mobile phone.

== Response ==
The European Saudi Organisation for Human Rights has described the charges against al-Otaibi stretching back to 2016 as showing the "true face" of the Saudi government's treatment of women and their human rights, and criticised her 2022 trial for authorities' decision to charge al-Otaibi for publicising her mistreatment rather than investigating the allegations she had made.

In May 2025, seven members of parliament from the House of Commons and three members of the House of Lords wrote to David Lammy, the Foreign Secretary of the United Kingdom, expressing their "deep concern" at the case of al-Otaibi and her sister Manahel, calling on him to use diplomatic means to end al-Otaibi's travel ban, as well as Manahel's ongoing detention. The Gulf Centre for Human Rights similarly called on Saudi authorities to stop harassing al-Otaibi and to abolish restrictions on female Saudi citizens under male guardianship laws.

A spokesperson for the Saudi government stated that al-Otaibi was not subject to any restrictions "other than... the administrative decision issued by the competent authority prohibiting [her] from travelling abroad".
