= 2023 in Saudi Arabia =

- Decades: 2000s; 2010s; 2020s; 2030s
- See also: Other events of 2023; History of Saudi Arabia

Events in the year 2023 in Saudi Arabia.

== Incumbents ==
Photo	Post	Name
	King of Saudi Arabia	Salman of Saudi Arabia
	Crown Prince of Saudi Arabia	Mohammad bin Salman

== Events ==
Ongoing — COVID-19 pandemic in Saudi Arabia

- January – The city of Jeddah experiences floods.
- 12 March – Saudi Crown Prince Mohammed bin Salman formally announces the establishment of Riyadh Air, a new flag carrier airline of Saudi Arabia.
- 27 March – Twenty people are killed and around 29 injured after a bus crashes and overturns in Asir Province.
- 13 April - Syrian Foreign Minister Faisal Mekdad arrives in Jeddah to meet Saudi Foreign Minister Faisal bin Farhan. After frayed relations during the Syrian civil war, both nations now seek "a political solution to the Syrian crisis that preserves the unity, security and stability of Syria,” according to the Saudi foreign ministry. This was any Syrian foreign minister's first visit to Saudi Arabia since 2011.
- 18 April - Saudi Foreign Minister Faisal bin Farhan meets President Bashar al-Assad in Damascus, to be the first Saudi official to visit the country since the start of the civil war in 2011.
- 19 May – The 2023 Makkah hotel fire claims eight lives.
- 21 May – Astronauts Ali AlQarni and Rayyanah Barnawi begin their journey to the International Space Station as part of the Axiom Mission 2 space mission.
- 28 June – 2023 Jeddah shooting. A gunman opened fire on security forces near the US consulate in Jeddah, resulting in the deaths of the attacker and a security guard.
- 18 July – A fatal road accident in Saudi Arabia resulted in five deaths and eight injuries. The incident involved a collision between a vehicle from Saudi Arabia and another from the UAE on the motorway connecting al-Batha to Haradh.
- 4 September – Saudi Pro League clubs will now play Champions League matches in Iran as both nations resume home-and-away games.
- 18 October – Saudi Arabia tells its citizens to immediately leave Lebanon due to the deteriorating security situation in southern Lebanon.
- 30 October – Saudi Arabia declares a "state of high alert" after four Saudi troops are killed in an attack by Houthi militants in Jazan Province near the border with Yemen. Saudi air defences also shoot down a ballistic missile over its territory that was travelling towards Israel.
- 29 November – Saudi Arabia’s capital Riyadh is chosen to host the 2030 World Expo, over South Korean port city Busan and Rome for the event expected to draw millions of visitors.
- 7 December – A Royal Saudi Air Force F-15SA Strike Eagle crashes during a training mission in Dhahran, killing both pilots.

=== Sports ===
- 12 December - 22 December - The 2023 FIFA Club World Cup took place.
- 31 December – 15 January – The 2023 Dakar Rally was held in Saudi Arabia.
- 4 – 17 September – The 2023 World Weightlifting Championships was held in Riyadh, Saudi Arabia.
- 28 October – Tyson Fury had a boxing match with Francis Ngannou in Riyadh.

== Deaths ==
- 15 January – Shaye Al-Nafisah, footballer (Al-Kawab, national team).
- 12 February – Yousef Al-Salem, footballer (Al Qadsiah, Ettifaq, national team).
- 28 February – Abdoh Besisi, footballer (Al Ahli, Al-Ansar, Ohod).
- 6 March – Abdulrahman al-Ansary, archaeologist.
- 9 March – Al Jawhara bint Abdulaziz Al Saud, royal.
- 31 March – Ossama bin Abdul Majed Shobokshi, diplomat and politician, minister of health (1995–2003).
- 15 May – Fahd Al-Hayyan, 52, actor.

== See also ==
- Saudi Arabia
- History of Saudi Arabia
- Outline of Saudi Arabia
