= 2026 in Saudi Arabia =

- Decades: 2000s; 2010s; 2020s; 2030s
- See also: Other events of 2026; History of Saudi Arabia

Events in the year 2026 in Saudi Arabia.

== Incumbents ==
- King: Salman

== Events ==
=== January ===
- 7 – 25 January – 2026 AFC U-23 Asian Cup
- 30 January – The United States approves the sale of 730 Patriot missiles and related equipment to Saudi Arabia valued at $9 billion.
- 31 January – The 2026 Royal Rumble takes place

=== February ===
- 9 February – Somalia and Saudi Arabia sign a military cooperation agreement.
- 20 February – Turkey and Saudi Arabia sign an agreement to strengthen bilateral investments in the solar energy sector.
- 28 February – In retaliation for the 2026 Israeli–United States strikes on Iran, Iran launches missiles at surrounding countries, including Saudi Arabia.

=== March ===
- 2 March – Iran launches a missile and drone attack on the Saudi Aramco oil refinery in Ras Tanura, causing several large fires at the facility, and forcing its closure by authorities.
- 3 March – A drone attack is carried out at the United States Embassy in Riyadh.
- 6 March – An Iranian ballistic missile strikes Prince Sultan Air Base in Riyadh Province.
- 8 March – A military projectile hits a residential area in Al-Kharj, Riyadh Province, killing two people and injuring 12 others.
- 12 March – The Saudi Ministry of Defense announces the interception of two Iranian missiles and the destruction of seven drones.
- 13 March – Saudi Arabia cuts oil production by 20% after the shutdown of two offshore oil fields, including the Safaniya oil field.
- 14 March – Five U.S. warplanes are damaged in an Iranian drone strike on Prince Sultan Air Base.
- 18 March – Saudi Arabia's air defenses intercept and destroy multiple drones targeting gas and energy facilities in the Eastern Province, with no damage reported.
- 21 March – Saudi Arabia expels the Iranian military attaché, his deputy and three other diplomatic staff due to Iranian attacks on the country.
- 27 March – An Iranian missile and drone strike on Prince Sultan Air Base damages several US refueling aircraft, including an E-3 Sentry, and injures fifteen US soldiers, including five critically. An E-3 Sentry is also damaged by the strike.

=== April ===
- 7 April –
  - Iranian drones strike a SABIC petrochemical complex in Jubail, causing a fire.
  - Saudi Arabia closes the King Fahd Causeway to Bahrain for several hours after the Iranian Fars News Agency published a list of strategic bridges in the Gulf region as potential targets for retaliation.
- 30 April – The Public Investment Fund announce the end of funding for the LIV Golf tournament after the end of the 2026 season.

=== May ===
- 14 May – The Public Investment Fund signs an agreement declaring it an "official tournament supporter" of the FIFA World Cup.

=== June ===
- 10 June – Saudi Arabia lifts a ban on imports from Lebanon that had been in place since 2021.
- 28 June — 2026 Saudi Aramco AW139 crash: A helicopter owned by Saudi Aramco crashes in Ras Tanura, killing 14 people.

=== July ===
- 13 July – The Houthis in Yemen fire missiles at Abha International Airport in response to an attack on Sanaa International Airport blamed on Riyadh.
- 16 July – The US approves some $2 billion in arms sales to Saudi Arabia.
- 20 July – The Houthis declare a blockade of Saudi Arabian ports and ships in the Bab-el-Mandeb.
- 22 July – The US signs a deal with Saudi Arabia to develop a civilian nuclear program in the country. US President Donald Trump demands that Saudi Arabia join the Abraham Accords so that the agreement will take effect.
- 23 July – The Houthis claim responsibility for strikes against two Saudi tankers in the Red Sea.
- 24 July:
  - Saudi Arabia carries out attacks on Hudaydah Port and facilities owned by the state telecommunications corporation in Hodeidah and Kamaran.
  - The United States imposes a 12.5% tariff on Saudi Arabia, citing the presence of alleged forced labour in the supply chain.
- 25 July – A Greek air defence system in Saudi Arbia downs two ballistic missiles fired from Yemen. The Houthis say that they conducted operations against Saudi Aramco facilities in Jizan and Yanbu.
- 27 July –
  - Saudi Arabia states that Iran-backed Iraqi militias fired drones towards oil facilities in the Eastern Province and Riyadh.
  - The Houthis states that they launched attack on Saudi crude oil transport infrastructure with drones.
- 28 July –
  - The Houthis claim to have targeted a Saudi ship using ballistic missiles.
  - Saudi Arabia says it shot down UAVs fired from Iraq at oil facilities.

=== August ===
- 4 August – The Houthis claim to have struck a Saudi target in the vicinity of Najran Regional Airport.
- 6 August – A Houthi missile attack in Najran Province injures 11 civilians.
- 7 August – Saudi Arabia, Pakistan, and Turkey sign a joint defense agreement.
- 9 August –
  - The Houthis state that they hit a Saudi Aramco refinery in Jizan.
  - A major fire at a factory in Riyadh kills 16 Bangladeshi migrant workers.
- 13 August –
  - The Houthis announce that they launched drone strikes on the Aramco refinery in Jazan.
  - Saudi Arabia announce the beginning of the Red Sea defence coalition led by the country.
- 14 August – The Houthis launch drone strikes on an Aramco facility in Najran.
- 18 August – The Houthis fire drones towards an Aramco oil refinery in Jazan.
- 20 August – The Houthis state that they targeted Najran Regional Airport and an Aramco facility in Najran.
- 24 August – The Houthis state they struck a vessel near Yanbu.
- 25 August – France and Saudi Arabia agree to build a $7 billion theme park in the vicinity of Paris.

=== September ===
- 8 September – September 2026 Houthi strikes on Saudi Arabia: The Houthis launch missile and drone attacks on civilian, economic and military facilities in Abha, Jizan, Najran and Khamis Mushait, wounding 73 people, including women and children, and igniting fires at oil facilities and utilities in southern Saudi Arabia.
- 11 September – Authorities close the East-West Crude Oil Pipeline following a drone attack carried out from Iraqi territory.
- 13 September –
  - Two people are injured in a Houthi attack in Jazan Province.
  - The Houthis declare that they launched a missile and drone attack on Sharurah military base.
- 14 September –
  - Authorities declare that they discovered about 114 million tons (or approximately 110 million tons in some reports) of ore that contain rare earth and uranium concentrations at the Jabal Sayid operation in the Medina Province.
  - The Houthis announce that they struck King Khalid Air Base.
- 15 September –
  - The Saudi-led coalition announce that Houthi attacks wounded 13 civilians in Khamis Mushait, Abha and Taif the day before.
  - The Saudi-led coalition state that they downed a Houthi drone south of Mecca. The Houthis deny the allegation.
- 16 September – The Houthis announce that they targeted King Khalid Air Base and Aramco utilities in Yanbu.
- 17 September –
  - Saudi state TV reports that one person was killed and two others were wounded amidst a drone downing in Taif.
  - The US authorizes the sale of F-35 Lightning II Joint Strike Fighter jets to Saudi Arabia.
- 18 September – An Italian Eurofighter Typhoon jet is damaged by the Houthis in Saudi Arabia after Italy announced that it will deploy warships to protect shipping through Bab al-Mandeb.
- 19 September – A fire erupts at a fuel storage depot at King Khalid International Airport in Riyadh. The Houthis state that they targeted "sensitive sites" in Riyadh and Aramco utilities in Yanbu. The Saudi-led coalition states it downed a Houthi ballistic missile launched at Riyadh.
- 22 September – In order to combat Houthi attacks, British Prime Minister Andy Burnham announces that the Royal Air Force would provide air-to-air refueling for Saudi aircraft.
- 24 September –
  - The Saudi-led coalition announces that it downed six ballistic missiles launched by the Houthis towards Taif and Yanbu.
  - The Houthis state that they struck "a sensitive target" in Riyadh and Aramco infrastructure in Yanbu.
  - French President Emmanuel Macron announces that the country will send soldiers to protect Saudi Arabia on a Red Sea oil route, as part of an accord with Riyadh.
- 26 September – The Saudi-led coalition state that it had downed two missiles and two drones ‌fired by the Houthis at Khamis Mushait and Riyadh.
- 30 September – A pilot stabs his colleague on Flydubai Flight 1073 operating from Dubai to Tel Aviv, prompting passenger intervention and an emergency landing in Prince Sultan bin Abdulaziz Airport in Tabuk.

=== October ===
- 1 October –
  - The Saudi-led coalition states that the Houthis struck a power station providing electricity to the Prophet's Mosque in Medina, one of Islam's holiest sites, causing one transformer to go out of service, ‌a claim denied by the group.
  - The Saudi-led coalition reports that they downed four Houthi drones and two ballistic missiles fired at Saudi Arabia.
- 2 October – The Saudi coalition announce that they downed three ballistic missiles fired by the Houthis at Khamis Mushait.
- 3 October –
  - Authorities announce that shrapnel from a downed Houthi ballistic ballistic missile wounded one individual in Ahad Rafidah.
  - The Houthis announce that they struck an Aramco facility in Riyadh using missiles and drones, a claim rejected by the Saudi-led coalition.
- 4 October – The head of Yemen's internationally recognized Presidential Leadership Council (PLC), Rashad al-Alimi, formally announces the start of a full-scale military counteroffensive from Saudi Arabia to reclaim all remaining Houthi-controlled territories. The Saudi-led coalition promises to back the offensive.
- 6–12 October – October 2026 attacks on Saudi Arabia airports.
- 15 October – The Saudi-led coalition says that a missile was intercepted in the Medina province, a claim rejected by the Houthis.
- 17 October – Authorities execute five nationals found guilty of "terrorism-related" offenses.
- 18 October – At least six people are injured in a Houthi attack that occurred in a Najran residential area.
- 19 October – The 10th edition of Saudi Arabia's flagship Future Investment Initiative ("Davos in the Desert") conference is postponed until 2027 due to increasing Houthi drone and missile attacks.
- 20 October – The United Kingdom declares that it would increase its military assistance to protect Saudi Arabia from Houthi drone and missile attacks.
- 21 October –
  - The Saudi-led coalition announces that it downed five drones in Eastern Province and Medina Province, while the Houthis deny that they targeted the kingdom.
  - A Filipino and a Nepali are killed by falling debris caused by the interception of a drone targeting the Shaybah oil field, while two others are wounded.
- 22 October – A resident is killed and eight others are wounded in an attack on King Fahd International Airport.
- 24 October – Authorities accuse the Houthis of targeting Mecca and Medina, a claim denied by the group.
- 25 October – King Salman, following a proposal by Crown Prince Mohammed bin Salman, directs a package of support measures for Saudi citizens, including a SAR 500 monthly allowance increase for eligible employees, retirees and Social Security beneficiaries, as well as higher wage thresholds under the Nitaqat Saudization program.
- 30 October –
  - The Saudi-led coalition announces that it eliminated a drone fired by Houthis towards Mecca, an allegation denied by the Houthis.
  - The Saudi-led coalition declares that it destroyed a Houthi drone above Medina province.

=== November ===
- 3 November – The Saudi-led coalition states that it downed a drone in Mecca Governorate.
- 4 November — The defence ministries of Saudi Arabia and Syria sign a cooperation pact.
- 5 November — The Saudi-led coalition states that it shot down a ballistic missile fired by the Houthis at the Medina Province, an allegation denied by the Houthis.
- 6 November — The Saudi-led coalition claims to have shot down a drone in Mecca.
- 8 November — The Aramco Tower is damaged in a Houthi air attack on Riyadh.
- 9 November —
  - Syria confirms sending soldiers to Saudi Arabia to defend the country from the Houthis.
  - The Saudi energy ministry announces that the East–West Crude Oil Pipeline was targeted in Medina Province the day before.
- 12 November — The Houthis states that they targeted the East-West pipeline.
- 16 November — Saudi Arabia fires the commander of the coalition fighting the Houthis.
- 19 November – A Houthi missile strike damages the Public Investment Fund Tower in Riyadh's King Abdullah Financial District and shatters windows across several floors; no casualties are reported.

=== Predicted and scheduled events ===
- 13–21 December – 2026 Asian Indoor and Martial Arts Games

== Deaths ==
- 4 February – Thuraya Qabil, 85, poet and journalist.
- 17 May – Mohamed Ali Hafez, 88–89, scouting executive and journalist, co-founder of Arab News.
- 17 October – Abdulaziz Al-Shahrani, 31, footballer (Damac, Al-Diriyah).

== See also ==
- Saudi Arabia
- History of Saudi Arabia
- Outline of Saudi Arabia
