= Public holidays in Saudi Arabia =

The Public holidays in Saudi Arabia (Arabic: العطل الرسمية في السعودية) are officially recognized holidays observed throughout the Kingdom of Saudi Arabia. The Kingdom observes four official public holidays, consisting of two national holidays and two religious holidays. The dates of the religious holidays are determined according to the Islamic calendar and therefore vary each year in the Gregorian calendar.

== List ==
Religious holidays
National holidays

Date	English name	Local name	Remarks
1–3 Shawwal	Feast of Breaking the Fast	Eid al-Fitr	Marks the end of Ramadan. The dates are determined by the sighting of the crescent moon.
9–12 Dhu al-Hijjah	Feast of the Sacrifice	Eid al-Adha	Commemorates the willingness of Ibrahim to sacrifice his son and coincides with the annual Hajj pilgrimage. The dates are determined by the sighting of the crescent moon.
22 February	Founding Day	Yawm Al-Ta'asees	Commemorates the establishment of the First Saudi State in 1727.
23 September	National Day	Al-Yawm Al-Watani	Commemorates the unification of Saudi Arabia in 1932.

== See also ==
- Saudi Flag Day
- Royal Seating Day
