= Royal Seating Day =

Former annual Saudi accession day observance

Royal Seating Day يوم الجلوس الملكي
- The royal flag of Saudi Arabia used between 1938 and 1953
- Official name: Royal Seating Day يوم الجلوس
- Observed by: Kingdom of Hejaz and Nejd and Its Dependencies (1930–1931); Kingdom of Saudi Arabia (1934–1963)
- Type: National
- Significance: Sovereign's pledge of allegiance and anniversary of the succession to the throne
- Date: 8 January (1930–1953); 12 November (1954–1963)
- Frequency: Annual
- First time: 8 January 1930
- Last time: 12 November 1963
- Started by: King Abdulaziz

The Royal Seating Day (Note: Arabic: يوم الجلوس الملكي; Romanization: Yawm al-Julūs al-Malakī) was the national accession day observed in the Kingdom of Hejaz and Nejd and Its Dependencies (1930–1931) and later in the Kingdom of Saudi Arabia (1934–1963). The national observance commemorated the sovereign's pledge of allegiance, falling on 8 January under King Abdulaziz and on 12 November under King Saud.

Following its final celebration in 1963, King Faisal officially abolished the observance in 1965 to center the occasion on the nation rather than the individual ruler. This established the Saudi National Day, shifting the focus to a fixed calendar date commemorating the country's 1932 unification while retaining its predecessor's historic 1930 year count.

== See also ==
- Saudi Flag Day
- Flag of Saudi Arabia
- Public holidays in Saudi Arabia
- National Anthem of Saudi Arabia
