= Fawzia al-Otaibi =

Saudi Arabian women's rights activist

- فوزیہ العتیبی
- Relatives: Manahel al-Otaibi (sister); Maryam al-Otaibi (sister)

Fawzia al-Otaibi (فوزیہ العتیبی) is a Saudi Arabian women's rights activist.

== Biography ==
Fawzia al-Otaibi is a Saudi Arabian women's rights activist.

In 2016, al-Otabibi and her sisters, Maryam and Manahel, began campaigning against the male guardianship system in Saudi Arabia, posting online using the hashtag #IAmMyOwnGuardian. A few days later, al-Otaibi and her sister Maryam were arrested. Manahel posted about their arrest online and this went viral internationally, prompting their release from prison.

In 2019, a police officer fined her for public indecency because of a video on her Snapchat account that showed her dancing in jeans and a baseball cap at a concert in Riyadh. After paying the fine, she moved to Dubai.

al-Otaibi returned home to Saudi Arabia in 2022 and was summoned by the authorities for questioning. She fled the country, firstly to Bahrain and then to Turkey. When the Police realised that she was not going to attend the station for questioning, she was issued with a travel ban. Her sister Maryam was also banned from travelling and has an open arrest warrant. Manahel was arrested.

After first appearing in court in 2023, in 2024 her sister Manahel was convicted of "terrorism offences" related to her clothing, shopping without an abaya, and expressing her views online. She was sentenced to 11 years' imprisonment. She has been denied family contact, has been placed in solitary confinement and her leg has been broken.

al-Otaibi moved to Edinburgh, Scotland in 2023. Since 2024, she has been working with Amnesty International to campaign for her sisters release from prison. She has told the organisation that she believes the only reason her sister was finally permitted a phone call was to convey a message to her family to stop being publicly outspoken about her imprisonment. She fears that her other sister, Maryam, could be arrested at any moment.

She was named a BBC 100 Women in 2024.

== See also ==
- Saudi anti male-guardianship campaign
- Women's rights in Saudi Arabia
