= 2023 Mecca hotel fire =

Hotel fire in Mecca, Saudi Arabia

2023 Makkah Hotel Fire
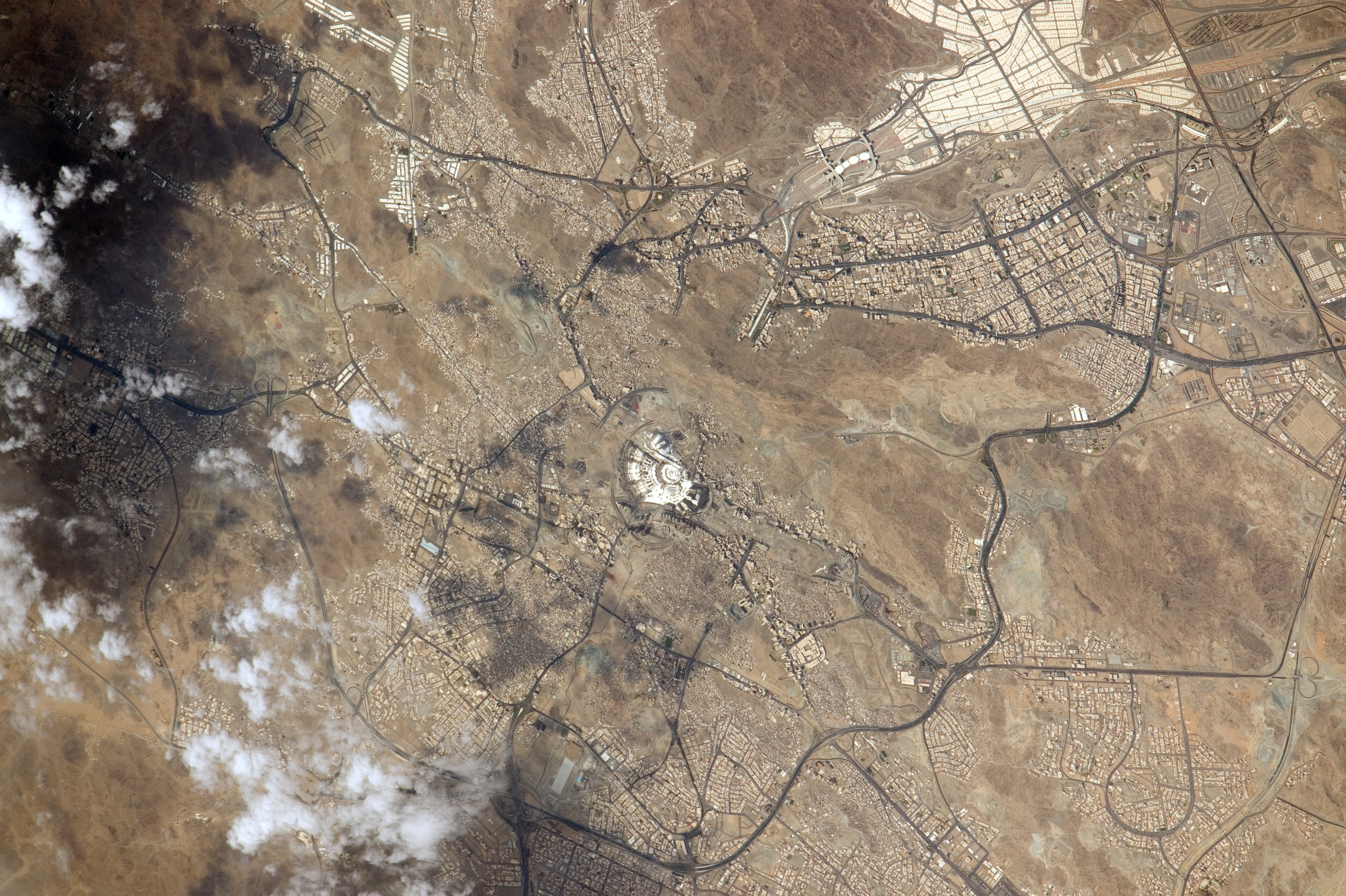
- Date: May 19, 2023
- Location: Mecca, Saudi Arabia
- Type: Structure fire
- Cause: Unknown
- Deaths: 8
- Injuries: 6

On May 19, 2023, a fire at a hotel in Mecca, Saudi Arabia killed eight people and injured six others. All of the deceased were Pakistani Umrah pilgrims.

== Victims ==
At least eight Pakistani Umrah pilgrims died in a hotel fire in Makkah on May 19, 2023, and numerous others were injured. Initial information was provided by the Pakistan Consul Welfare, which stated that four of the deceased had been identified, two of whom hailed from the city of Kasur and the other two from Vihari. The identification of the remaining bodies was still in progress.

The Pakistan Foreign Office worked with local authorities to offer support to the victims and their families. A spokesperson for the Foreign Office confirmed the eight fatalities and the ongoing medical care for six injured people.

== Assistance and reactions ==
The Pakistan Consulate in Jeddah closely coordinated relief efforts with local authorities.

Prime Minister Shehbaz Sharif and the Pakistani government expressed their profound sorrow over the deaths of Pakistani pilgrims. The prime minister instructed the Ministry of Religious Affairs to provide the best medical care to the injured and all necessary support to the families of the deceased.

Kamran Tessori, the governor of Sindh, also sent his condolences to the victims' families.
