= Turki bin Abdulaziz al-Jasser =

Saudi Arabian journalist (killed 2025)

- تركي بن عبد العزيز الجاسر
- Died: 14 June 2025; Saudi Arabia
- Cause of death: Execution
- Citizenship: Saudi Arabia
- Occupations: Blogger; journalist
- Known for: Accused of operating the anonymous Twitter account Kashkol (كشكول)
- Criminal charges: High treason; Communicating with hostile parties; Financing terrorist activities
- Criminal penalty: Death
- Criminal status: Executed

Turki bin Abdulaziz al-Jasser (died 14 June 2025) was a Saudi blogger and journalist. Al-Jasser was allegedly running a Twitter account called Kashkol (Arabic: كشكول) as a public square for Saudi citizens to receive information on the Arab Spring, women's rights, and corruption, and to express their opinions. He was arrested during a raid on his home in 2018 and detained for seven years, during which time he was allegedly tortured, and executed on 14 June 2025.

== Career ==
Al-Jasser founded the news blog Al-Mashhad Al-Saudi and contributed to the now-closed newspaper Al-Taqrir. He ran a personal blog between 2013 and 2015 and wrote about topics including the Arab Spring, women's rights, and corruption.

== Arrest and detention ==
Saudi authorities arrested al-Jasser in 2018 and accused him of operating the anonymous X (then Twitter) account Kashkool, which reported allegations of corruption and human rights abuses linked to the Saudi royal family, according to Human Rights Watch and the Committee to Protect Journalists. Human Rights Watch said the legal proceedings were not publicly documented and that the case was shrouded in secrecy.

== Trial and execution ==
On 14 June 2025, Saudi authorities announced that al-Jasser had been executed in Riyadh on charges including treason.

== Reactions ==
In July 2025 UNESCO's then Director-General, Audrey Azoulay, condemned the execution, calling capital punishment against journalists an attack on freedom of expression and press freedom.
