= 2025 in Saudi Arabia =

- Decades: 2000s; 2010s; 2020s; 2030s
- See also: Other events of 2025; History of Saudi Arabia

Events in the year 2025 in Saudi Arabia.

== Incumbents ==
Photo	Post	Name
	King of Saudi Arabia	Salman of Saudi Arabia
	Crown Prince of Saudi Arabia	Mohammed bin Salman

== Events ==
=== January ===
- January 1 – The government announces the execution of six Iranian nationals for smuggling hashish.
- 8 – 12 January – 2025 Supercopa de España
- January 29 – A bus carrying foreign workers crashes into a trailer near Jizan, killing 15 people and injuring 11 others.

=== February ===
- February 18 – Russia and the United States begin official discussions in Riyadh on ending the Russo-Ukrainian War.

=== March ===
- March 20 –
  - The United States approves the sale of Advanced Precision Kill Weapon Systems to Saudi Arabia for the first time.
  - A bus carrying Umrah pilgrims from Indonesia crashes along the Medina-Mecca highway in Wadi Qudaid, killing six people and injuring 14 others.

=== April ===
- 27 April – The Qatari and Saudi Arabian finance ministries announce in a joint statement that they will pay off Syria's $15 million debt to the World Bank, which is finalized on 16 May.

=== June ===
- 14 June – Journalist Turki bin Abdulaziz al-Jasser is executed on charges of treason and terrorism after having been imprisoned since 2018.

=== July ===
- 30 July – A circular carousel collapses at an amusement park in Al Hada, Taif, injuring 23 people.

=== August ===
- 5 – 17 August – 2025 FIBA Asia Cup

=== September ===
- 17 September – Pakistan and Saudi Arabia sign a mutual defence agreement.
- 27 September – The Imam Turki bin Abdullah Royal Reserve is designated as a biosphere reserve by UNESCO.

=== October ===
- 10 October – The first direct passenger flight from Riyadh to Moscow, operated by Saudi Arabian flag carrier Saudia, lands at Sheremetyevo Airport.
- 22 October – Salih al‑Fawzan is appointed Grand Mufti of Saudi Arabia by King Salman.
- 26 October – Riyadh Air begins its inaugural scheduled commercial service with daily flights between Riyadh and London Heathrow as the airline starts operations in late 2025.

=== November ===
- 17 November – 2025 Medina bus crash: A bus carrying Indian pilgrims undertaking Umrah catches fire near Medina, killing 45 of the 46 people on board.

=== December ===
- 1 December – Saudi Arabia and Russia sign an agreement on mutual visa exemption for each other's citizens.
- 8 December — Saudi Arabia and Qatar sign an agreement to build a high-speed railway connecting Riyadh and Doha.
- 21 December – The Saudi government awards Field Marshal Asim Munir, chief of defense forces of Pakistan, the country's highest national award, the King Abdulaziz Medal of the Excellent Class.
- 26 December – The Royal Saudi Air Force begins a series of airstrikes against separatist forces in southern Yemen.
- 30 December – Saudi Arabia and the Yemeni Presidential Leadership Council issue an ultimatum to the United Arab Emirates to end its support for southern separatists in Yemen, prompting the UAE to announce that it would withdraw its remaining security personnel from the country.
- 31 December – Six Flags Qiddiya City officially opens to the public, with the Falcons Flight attraction breaking records as the worlds tallest, fastest, and longest roller coaster.

== Deaths ==
- 28 January – Muhammad bin Fahd Al Saud, 75, governor of Eastern Province (1985-2013)
- 19 July – Al-Waleed bin Khalid Al-Saud, 35, prince
- 23 September – Abdulaziz Al Sheikh, 84, Grand Mufti of Saudi Arabia (since 1999)

== See also ==
- Saudi Arabia
- History of Saudi Arabia
- Outline of Saudi Arabia
