= Manahel al-Otaibi =

Saudi fitness instructor and activist

- مناهل العتيبي
- Born: 1994 (age 31–32)
- Occupations: Fitness influencer, prisoner of conscience
- Known for: Sentenced to 11 years in prison by the Specialized Criminal Court for her tweets advocating for women's rights and for being pictured in fitness wear
- Movement: Saudi anti male-guardianship campaign
- Criminal charges: Terrorism
- Criminal penalty: 11 years in prison
- Criminal status: Detained since September 2022
- Relatives: Maryam and Fawzia al-Otaibi, sisters

Manahel bint Nasser Khalaf al-Otaibi (Arabic: مناهل العتيبي; born 1994) is a fitness instructor and women's rights activist from Saudi Arabia. In 2024 she was convicted of terrorism offenses by a secret court after sharing posts on social media advocating for an end of the Saudi guardianship system and for showing images of herself shopping without wearing an abaya. She was sentenced to 11 years in prison.

Human rights organizations ALQST and Amnesty International have called her imprisonment unjust. In February 2025, Amnesty reported that al-Otaibi had been "forcibly disappeared" by the Saudi government, as her whereabouts were unknown and her lawyers and family could not speak to her.

== Biography ==
Manahel Nasser al-Otaibi is a Saudi Arabian influencer and fitness blogger. Living in Riyadh, the influencer and certified fitness trainer used Twitter, Snapchat and Instagram to share fitness videos and posts advocating for women's rights in the country.

=== Activism ===
In 2016, Manahel and her sisters Maryam and Fawzia became known for their social media advocacy around the #IAmMyOwnGuardian campaign, calling for an end to the male guardianship system. In 2019, al-Otaibi shared with Deutsche Welle that she was optimistic of the appointment of Crown Prince Mohammed bin Salman and her hopes that his rule would lead to greater liberalism in the country for women. That year, Manahel's sister Maryam was placed under an illegal travel ban.

=== Arrest ===
Later, Saudi authorities accused Manahel of leading a propaganda campaign. In September 2022, al-Otaibi was detained by Saudi Arabian authorities. Manahel's older sister Fawzia fled Saudi Arabia for Scotland where she was granted political asylum. In November 2022, al-Otaibi was formally charged for violating Saudi Arabia's Anti-Cyber Crime Law, for allegedly "opposing the laws relating to women, such as the male guardianship system and the hijab law"; "participating in several hashtags opposing these laws"; "having several photos and video clips in indecent clothes on [social media] accounts", and "going to the shops without wearing an abaya, photographing this, and publishing it on Snapchat".

In January 2023, she appeared before judges who referred her case to the Specialized Criminal Court, and kept in confinement.

According to Amnesty International, al-Otaibi was "forcibly disappeared" between November 5, 2023, and April 14, 2024 by Saudi authorities, and her family could not get in contact with her. The organization disclosed that al-Otaibi was subject to torture while being held in solitary confinement in al-Malaz Prison.

=== Conviction ===
In January 2024, the Permanent Mission of the Kingdom of Saudi Arabia to the United Nations confirmed al-Otaibi was convicted of terrorism charges and imprisoned for 11 years. At the time of her arrest, ALQST's Lina al-Hathloul said, "Saudi authorities have once again laid bare the arbitrary and contradictory nature of their so-called reforms, and their continuing determination to control Saudi Arabia's women". al-Otaibi's conviction and trial occurred behind closed doors and without informing her family or advocates.

In April 2024, a consortium of international human rights organizations, including Freedom House, Amnesty International, ALQST for Human Rights and the European Saudi Organisation for Human Rights (ESOHR) wrote an open letter calling for al-Otaibi's release. The letter outlined how al-Otaibi had been tortured in prison and was suffering from a broken leg without medical intervention.

In October 2024, al-Otaibi shared that she had been stabbed in the face while imprisoned by unknown assailants. In November 2024, the Specialized Criminal Court of appeals upheld her 11-year criminal sentence.

== See also ==
- Salma al-Shehab, Saudi Arabian prisoner of conscience
- 2018–2019 Saudi crackdown on feminists
- Nourah al-Qahtani, arrested for tweets
