= Al-Chemor =

Lebanese ancient noble Christian clan

Al-Chemor (pronounced Ach-Chmorr, Shammar, Shamir or Shummar in Arabic الشمرّ) is an ancient noble Christian Arab clan from Lebanon.

== History ==
The family ruled two sheikhdoms in Northern Lebanon, Aqoura from 1211 to 1633 and the Zawyia region of Zgharta from 1641 to 1747. Its lineage traces from King Abu Chemor, a Christian Ghassanid who gave his name to the family. Its sheikhs were the last Ghassanid princes to rule until the 18th century. They derived from the Yamanis and left Akoura in the 17th century. Some members moved to Jeita in Keserwan where Sleiman Chemor was a prominent land owner.

Other family members left Tripoli to inhabit and rule Aradat and Kfarhata. In 1654 Abdallah Bin Chemor Al Akoury was killed by the followers of the Hamadi Cheikhs after they were assigned to rule Jebbet Becharri by the governor of Tripoli, Mouhammad Bacha Al Koubary. When the aggression of the Hamadis increased, the governor launched two battalions against the Shiite renegades, one of them headed by Daher El Daher and one by Youssef Chemor. The campaign met its goals but one of the leaders, Bechara Karam, was ambushed and killed in Meghayri, south of Akoura. The Chemors were related by marriage to the Yaghis of Akoura.

The Ghassanids are the largest tribe in the Arabic peninsula. During the 2nd century CE they emigrated from Yemen after the Marib Dam break to Syria in search of water sources. They established themselves near the “Ghassan spring” from which they took their name. The Ghassanids tribe was Christian and allied to the Byzantines.

Abou Choummar Jabla was one of the first Ghassanid kings, ruling around 500. His son was the most prominent Ghassanid King. He was named “the Great Protector” because he defended the Christians against the barbarians with the help and the benediction of Byzantine Emperor Justinian. His kingdom included the regions of Houran, Mount Hermon, the Golan, the Jordan valley and Damascus. In 635, the Ghassanid kingdom disappeared when the area was conquered by Muslims. The Choummar (from Abou Choummar Jabla) had to flee to Lebanon; their first stay was in the Christian Maronite region of Akoura (Byblos District) where geological and historical safety was provided.

The Choummar inhabited and ruled the rich agricultural region of Akoura in today's Lebanon from 1211 until 1633. They ruled Zawiya from 1641 to 1747 and took Kfarhata near Zgharta as their home town. During this period, many disputes between them and the Daher occurred. One led them to escape the village and take refuge in Beit Habbak, a small hillside village near Byblos, where a big ramification of the Chemor family took place (Hobeika...).
