= Thuraya Qabil =

Saudi Arabian poet and journalist (1940–2026)

Thuraya Qabil ثريا قابل
- Born: 1940; Jeddah, Saudi Arabia
- Died: 4 February 2026 (aged 85)
- Occupation: Poet
- Writing career
- Language: Arabic

Thuraya Muhammad Abdul Qadir Qabil (sometimes spelt as Gabel, Arabic: ثريا محمد عبد القادر قابل; 1940 – 4 February 2026) was a Saudi Arabian poet and journalist.

== Life and career ==
Qabil was born in Jeddah in 1940, and had a degree from the National College in Beirut.

With the issuance of The Weeping Rhythms in 1963, she became the first Saudi woman in the Hijaz to publish a poetry collection; she was one of a number of women from the region, including Fatna Shakir, Abdiya Khayyat, and Huda Dabbagh, to become prominent in Saudi letters during the 1950s and 1960s. The collection was a success, and many of its poems became the basis for popular songs, but it remained her only book of verse.

She was active as a journalist, serving as chief editor of Zina magazine from 1986 until 1987 and working as an editor for the newspapers al-Bilad and 'Ukaz as well.

Qabil died in Jeddah on 4 February 2026, at the age of 85.
