= 2024 in Saudi Arabia =

- Decades: 2000s; 2010s; 2020s; 2030s
- See also: Other events of 2024; History of Saudi Arabia

Events in the year 2024 in Saudi Arabia.

== Incumbents ==
| Photo | Post | Name |
|---|---|---|
| | King of Saudi Arabia | Salman of Saudi Arabia |
| | Crown Prince of Saudi Arabia | Mohammad bin Salman |

== Events ==
=== January ===
- January 1 – Saudi Arabia formally joins the BRICS group.
- January 9 – Women's rights activist and influencer Manahel al-Otaibi is convicted of terrorism charges for tweeting about ending the system of male guardianship in the country and sentenced to 11 years in prison.
- January 24 – Saudi Arabia, where alcohol had been banned since 1952, opens its first alcohol store in the diplomatic quarter of Riyadh.

=== March ===
- March 8 – Anthony Joshua holds a boxing match against Francis Ngannou in Riyadh.

=== May ===
- May 24 – 2024 Cannes Film Festival: Norah becomes the first film from Saudi Arabia to screen as part of the official calendar at the Cannes Film Festival.

=== June ===
- 14–19 June – 2024 Hajj disaster: At least 1,301 pilgrims die from heat-related causes during the Hajj in Mecca according to figures released by various countries. This is the worst in the history of the Hajj.

=== July ===
- 12 July – The International Olympic Committee announce that Saudi Arabia will host the inaugural Olympics Esports Games in 2025.
- 18 July – Saudia group and Lilium GmbH sign a binding sales agreement for 50 electric Lilium Jets, with options for the purchase of 50 more.
- July 26–August 11 – Saudi Arabia at the 2024 Summer Olympics.

=== August ===
- 9 August – The Biden administration partially lifts a three-year-old ban on US weapons sales to Saudi Arabia.

=== December ===
- 1 December – The first three lines of the Riyadh Metro begin operations.
- 11 December – Saudi Arabia wins the hosting rights for the 2034 FIFA World Cup.
- 23 December – Saudi Arabia reopens its embassy in Afghanistan for the first time since the Taliban takeover in 2021.

== See also ==
- Saudi Arabia
- History of Saudi Arabia
- Outline of Saudi Arabia
