= Saudi Flag Day =

Annual Saudi National Flag Day observance

Saudi Flag Day يوم العلم السعودي
- The national flag of Saudi Arabia
- Official name: Flag Day يوم العلم
- Observed by: Saudi Arabia
- Type: National
- Significance: Official approval of the final design of the Saudi national flag in 1937
- Date: 11 March
- Frequency: Annual
- First time: 11 March 2023; 3 years ago
- Started by: King Salman

The Saudi Flag Day (Note: Arabic: يوم العلم السعودي; Romanization: Yawm al-ʿAlam al-Suʿūdī) is an official national observance in Saudi Arabia celebrated annually on 11 March. The observance was established in 2023 by a royal decree issued by King Salman, commemorating the official approval of the final design of the country's national flag by King Abdulaziz on 11 March 1937.

== History ==
The origin of the Saudi national flag dates back to the historic banner utilized by the imams of the First Saudi State in 1727. Following the unification of the territories, King Abdulaziz officially approved the design of the flag on 11 March 1937 to represent the nation internationally. The design remained in official use for 36 years until 1973, when King Faisal issued the Saudi Flag Bylaw to standardize its exact dimensions and visual layout. Recent official guidelines have introduced minor updates to the standardized design, adding vowel diacritics (tasheekl) and hamzas to the Shahada, alongside subtle artistic enhancements to the grip of the ceremonial sword.

On 1 March 2023, King Salman issued a royal decree designating 11 March as Flag Day, establishing it as an annual national observance to honor the flag's heritage and strengthen civic pride. King Salman emphasized the significance of the event, stating:

The celebration of Flag Day is an affirmation of our pride in our national identity, its historic symbolism that has great connotations and profound implications, which embodies our constants, and a source of pride in our history.

— King Salman

The inaugural observance in 2023 was marked across the country by three days of public cultural exhibitions and theatrical shows organized by the Ministry of Culture.

== See also ==
- Royal Seating Day
- Flag of Saudi Arabia
- Public holidays in Saudi Arabia
- National Anthem of Saudi Arabia
