= 2022–2023 Saudi Arabia floods =

Disaster in Saudi Arabia

November 2022 Saudi Arabia floods
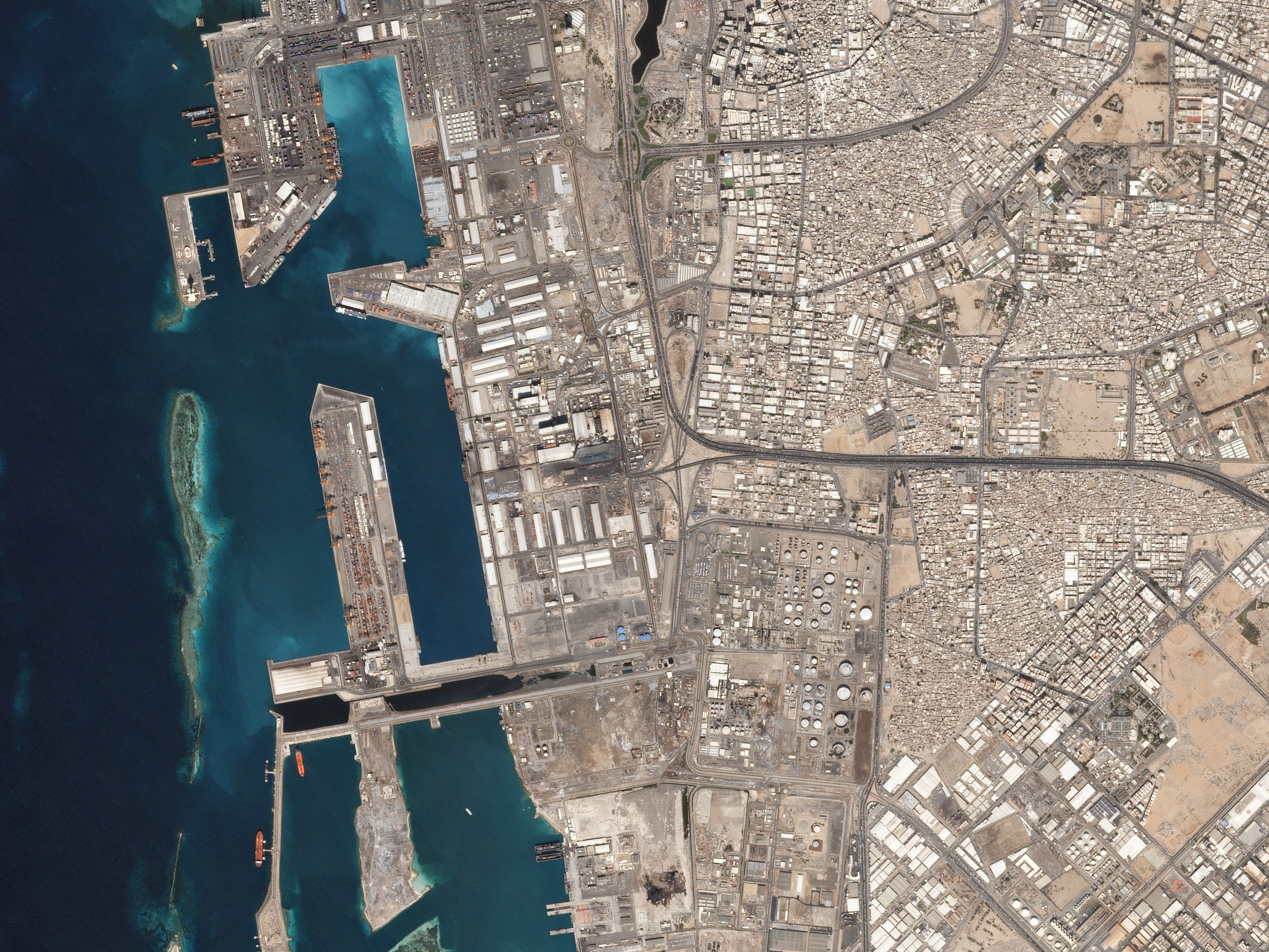
- Jeddah
- Date: 24 November 2022
- Location: Jeddah
- Cause: Heavy rainfall
- Deaths: 2

In November 2022, Saudi Arabia was hit by riverine flooding as a result of heavy rain. The main affected area was the city of Jeddah in which two people were killed. As a result, flights were delayed and schools were closed. The main road to Mecca was also closed.

December 2022 Saudi Arabia floods
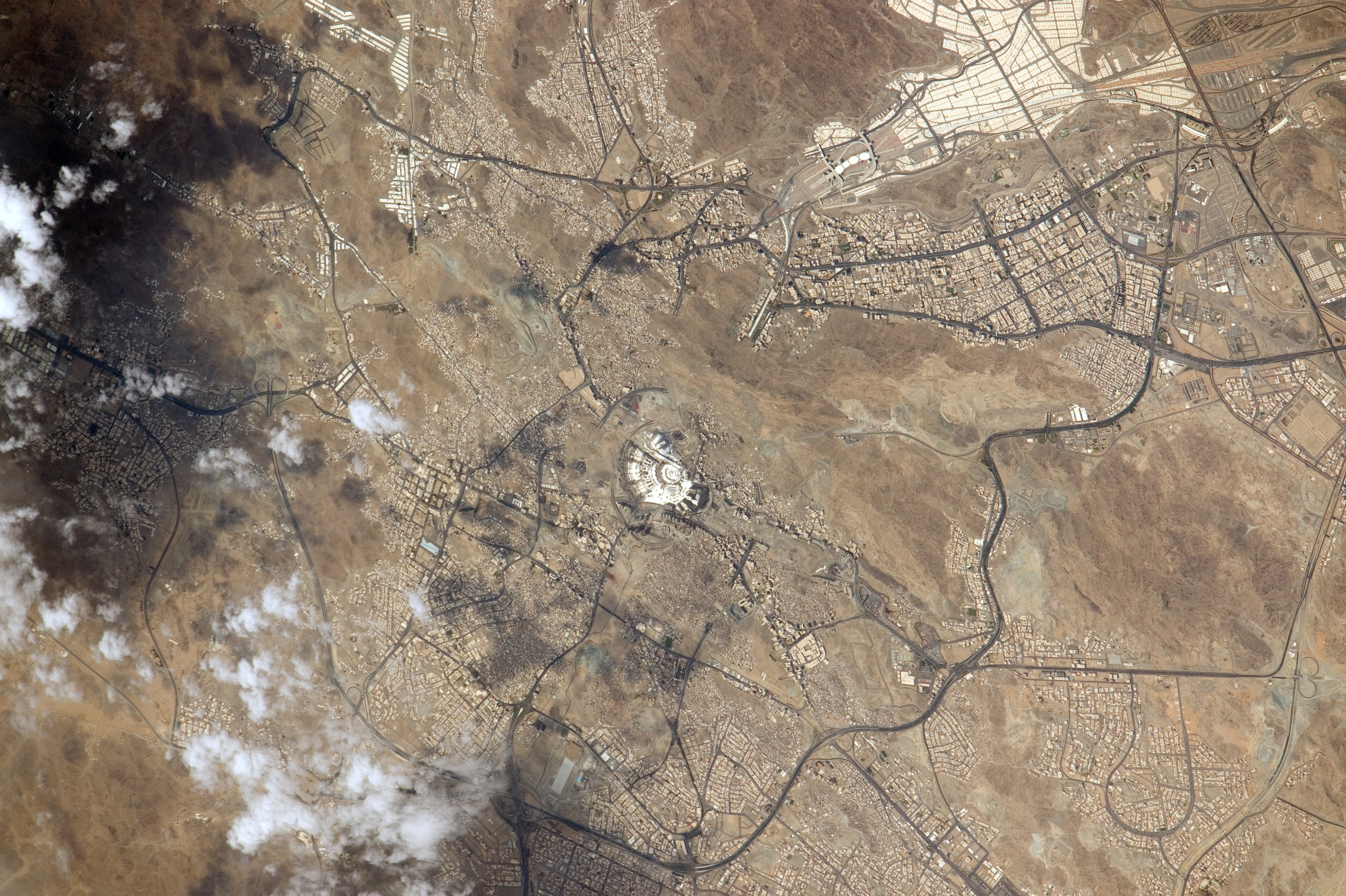
- Mecca
- Date: 23 December 2022
- Location: Mecca
- Cause: Heavy rainfall

On 23 December 2022, torrential rain caused flash flooding in Mecca. In the start of January 2023, Jeddah experienced further floods.

== See also ==
- 2009 Jeddah floods
