= National Anthem of Saudi Arabia =

an-Našīd al-Waṭanī as-Suʿūdī
- National Anthem of Saudi Arabia النشيد الوطني السعودي
- National anthem of Saudi Arabia
- Also known as: عاش الملك (English: "Long Live the King") النشيد الوطني (English: "The National Anthem")
- Lyrics: Ibrāhīm Khafājī, 1984
- Music: Abd al-Raḥman al-Khaṭīb (arranged by Sirāj Umar), 1947
- Adopted: 1950 (as instrumental)
- Readopted: June 29, 1984 (with lyrics)

Audio sample
- U.S. Navy Band instrumental version (c. 2016) in F major: file; help

U.S. Navy Band instrumental version (fast tempo) (c. 2003)

U.S. Navy Band instrumental version (c. 2011)

K.S.A. Royal guard Band instrumental version (c. 1984)

National Anthem of Saudi Arabia (Arabic: ٱلنَّشِيْد ٱلْوَطَنِي ٱلسُّعُوْدِي, romanized: an-Našīd al-Waṭanī as-Suʿūdī) is the national anthem of Saudi Arabia. It was first officially adopted in 1950 without lyrics. The piece was gifted by the King Farouk of Egypt (r. 1936–1952) when King Abd al-Aziz (r. 1932–1953) made a visit to Egypt. It was then adopted again in 1984 with lyrics written by Ibrahim Khafaji. The original composition was by Abd al-Rahman al-Khatib in 1947, and the brass instrumental version was later arranged by Siraj Umar.

== Overview ==
Unlike its neighbours, Saudi Arabia did not have a national anthem in 1947. Therefore, King Abdulaziz travelled to Egypt and commissioned Abd al-Rahman al-Khaṭib, an Egyptian composer, to write one. The result was 'Ash-Shams al-Malik'. Based on the style of Arab fanfares, its melody is similar to those of other Arab states in the region at the time. In 1958, Mohammed Talat wrote the first set of lyrics, which were rarely performed. In 1984, King Fahd commissioned the poet Ibrahim Khafaji to write new lyrics, which he completed on 29 June. Khafājī's lyrics are the ones that are used officially today. Saudis listened to their anthem for the first time during the celebrations of Eid al-Fitr in 1984.

Although it is more commonly known by its opening words, 'Hasten' (Sārʿī), the Saudi people refer to 'Ash al-Malik' as 'The National Anthem' (an-Našīd al-Waṭānī). The lyrics encourage the country to strive for greatness and to raise the flag, and ask God to grant the King of Saudi Arabia a long life.

The instrumental version is called "The Royal Salute" (السلام الملكي, as-Salām al-Malakī), which is also the name of the ceremony in which it is played to salute senior members of the royal family as well as diplomatic figures.

== Lyrics ==
=== Official lyrics ===
Arabic original

سَارِعِي
لِلمَجْدِ وَالعَلْيَاء
مَجِّدِي لِخَالِقِ السَّمَاء
وَارْفَعِي الخَفَّاقَ أَخْضَر (Note: Also sung as وَارْفَعِي الخَفَّاقَ الأَخْضَر)
يَحْمِلُ النُّورَ المُسَطَّر
رَدِّدِي: اللَّهُ أَكْبَر (Note: "Allahu Akbar" is Arabic for "God is the Greatest" but is expressed the same way by every Muslim in the world, regardless of their native language.)
يَا مَوْطِنِي
مَوْطِنِي
قَدْ عِشْتَ فَخْرَ الْمُسْلِمِين
عَاشَ المَلِك
لِلعَلَم
وَالوَطَن

MSA Romanization

Sāriʿī
Li-l-majdi wa-l-ʿalyāʾ,
Majjidī li-xāliqi s-samāʾ
Wa-rfaʿī l-xaffāqa ʾaxḍar
Yaḥmilu n-nūra l-musaṭṭar,
Raddidī: Allāhu ʾakbar
Yā mawṭinī
Mawṭinī,
Qad ʿišta faxra l-muslimīn
ʿĀš al-malik
Li-l-ʿalam
Wa-l-waṭan

IPA transcription (Note: See Help:IPA/Arabic and Saudi Arabian Arabic.)

[saː.rɪ.ʕiː]
[lɪ‿l.mad͡ʒ.di wa‿l.ʕal.jaːʔ |]
[mad.d͡ʒi.diː li xaː.lɪ.qɪ‿sːa.maːʔ ‖]
[war.fa.ʕɪ‿l.xaf.faː.qa ʔax.dˤar]
[jaħ.mɪ.lʊ‿nːuː.ra‿l.mʊ.satˤːar |]
[radːɪ.diː ʔaɫːaː.hu ʔak.bar ‖]
[jaː maw.tˤɪ.niː ‖]
[maw.tˤɪ.niː |]
[qad ʕɪʃ.ta fax.ra‿l.mʊs.lɪ.miːn ‖]
[ʕaː.ʃa‿l.ma.lɪk]
[lɪ‿l.ʕa.lam]
[wa‿l.wa.tˤan ‖]

English translation

Hasten
To glory and supremacy,
Glory in the Creator of the heavens!
And raise the green flag
Carrying the written light reflecting guidance,
Repeat: God is the greatest!
O my homeland!
My homeland,
Live as the pride of the Muslims!
Long live the King
For the flag
And the land!

Notes: Some variations remove the word قَدْ qad before "عِشْتَ فَخْرَ الْمُسْلِمِيْن ʿišta faxra l-muslimīn" and other variations use the word المَلِيك al-malīk instead of المَلِك al-malik.

=== Saud lyrics (1958) ===
Arabic original

العُلَى لِمَن؟ يابَني الوَطَنِْ
تَوءَا خُلودْ نحــــــنُ والزَّمـــــنْ
سائِلوا الجُدودْ سائِلوا الحِقَبْ
يَهتُفوا سُعودْ عاهِلَ العَرَبْ
لِصَاحِبِ الْجَلَالَـةِ الْعَظِيْم لِقَائِدِ الْعُرُوبَةِ الْحَكِيْم
أَرْوَاحُنَا فِدى ، شِعارُنا الهُدى ، السِّلمِ في الرِّدى ، لِلتَّاجِ لِلْوَطن
كَوكَبٌ في السَماءْ عرشُه من إِباءْ
تاجُه دُرَّةُ الأوْفياء مَجْدُهُ شُعْلَةٌ من ضِيَاءْ
عاشَ المَلِكْ ، عاشَ الوَطَنْ
شبابُنا الهُمامُ يَقْتَدي بِرائِدِ الجِهادِ يَهْتَدي
سُعودِةِ الأبْي، وجيشِ يَعْرُبِ يَحوطُهُ النبَّيْ يُبَارِكُ الوَطَنْ
يا حِمَى زَغْرِدي يا سَما رَدِّدي
وابْسِمى لِلْمُنَى واشْهدي أنَّنا فِتْيَةُ الَُسؤْدَدِ
عاشَ المَلِكْ ، عاشَ الوَطَنْ
يُتَوِّجُ الجَزيرَةَ العَلَمْ يُعانِقُ الرّياَضَ والحَرَمْ
نَخيلُنا جلال ، سُيوفُنا طِوَالْ مَلِكُنَا هِلالْ ، يُزيِّنُ الوطَنْ
عَدْلْه في الزَّمانْ شِاهدٌ لِلْعَيَانْ
أسْدُهُ ، ظَبْيُهُ ، في أمَانْ شَعْبُهُ ، جُنْدُهُ ، لَنْ يُهانْ
عاشَ المَلِكْ ، عاشَ الوَطَنْ

English translation

For whom? Son of homeland
We are the eternity of time
They asked the old, the years
They chant, Saudi Arabia's King
To the great majesty of the wise leader of Arabia
Our souls are ransom, our motto is guidance, peace is in the dark, for the crown of the homeland
A planet in the sky has its throne from Aba
His crown is a jewel of the faithful, his glory is a torch of light
Long live the king, long live the homeland
Our proud youth lead the pioneer of jihad
The Saudis of the Father, and an Arab army surrounded by the Prophet, blessing the homeland
Roaring fever, Sama, respond
And give my name to Mina, and bear witness that we are young lions.
Long live the king, long live the homeland
The flag crowns the isle, embraces the scholars and sanctuaries
Our palms are majestic, our swords are as long as our king is a crescent, decorating the homeland
His justice in time is evident
His lion, his antelope, in the safety of his people, his soldiers, will not be insulted
Long live the king, long live the homeland

=== Ibn Saud lyrics (1947) ===
Arabic original

يَعِيشْ مَلِكُنَا الْحَبِيبْ
أَرْوَاحِنَا فِدَاهِ حَامِي الْحَرَمْ
هَيَّا اهْتِفُواْ عَاشَ الْمَلكْ
هَيَّا ارْفَعُواْ رَايَةَ الْوَطَنْ
اِهْتَفُواْ وَرَدِّدُوا النَّشِيدْ
يَعِيشَ الْمَلِكْ

English translation

Long live our beloved king
Our souls are the protector of the sanctuary
Come on, cheer, long live the king
Come on, raise the flag of the homeland
Cheer and chant the anthem
Long live the king

== See also ==
- National symbols of Saudi Arabia
