= Theatre of Saudi Arabia =

Saudi Theater is a performing art presented on-stage across Saudi Arabia and is overseen by the Saudi Ministry of Culture. The Saudi Arabian Society for Culture and Arts plays a major role in showcasing, fostering, and supporting Saudi theater in all regions of the Kingdom.

The theatrical movement in Saudi Arabia can be traced back to a play written by poet Hussain Abdullah Siraj in the year 1932, titled "He Who Wrongs Himself (Al-Zalim li-Nafsih)." However, it wasn't until 1950 that the theatrical scene gained momentum when shows were held across Saudi theaters, most notably including the "Salah Al Din" and "Abdul Rahman Al Dakhil" plays. Between 1960 and 1970, theatrical plays evolved into social dramas that were enjoyed by all members of society. Within Saudi Theater, performance arts can be classified into various different categories, including School Theater, Social or Community Theater, Experimental Theater, Elite Theater, and Academic theater.

In 2018, 273 plays were held across Saudi theatres, according to statistics published by the Saudi Arabian Society for Culture and Arts. In 2019, the General Entertainment Authority produced 44 plays, with most of them being locally made, while some featured artists from the Gulf, such as "The Wolf in the Well (Al-Dhib fi-l-Qalib)" portrayed by actor Nasser Al Qasabi.

In 2019, the National Theater and Orchestra was formed, with the King Fahad Cultural Center functioning as its headquarters. In January 2020, the Theater and Performing Arts Commission was established to develop and support the theatrical sector and encourage investment in it. In October 2021, the Minister of Human Resources and Social Development announced a decision to set up the first-ever professional association for theater and performance arts, whose board would be chaired by Nasser Al Qasabi and would include members like Dr. Sami Al Juman, Rashid Al Shamrani, Khalid Albaz, Yasser Madkhali, Fahad Al Hawshani, Roaa Alsahhaf, Yaser Bakr, Sami Al Zahrani, Fatima Al Banawi, and Samira Al Khamis.

== History ==
The history of theatrical activities in the Kingdom of Saudi Arabia dates back to 1928 when the first play entitled "Dialogue between the ignorant and uneducated" was performed in Qassim in front of King Abdulaziz. The Ministry of Culture and Information is one of several organizations that have been established throughout the country to preserve and sponsor Saudi theater. The Saudi Arabian Society for Culture and Arts, The King Fahd Cultural Center, and King Abdulaziz Center for World Culture also sponsor Saudi theater activities in the kingdom.

== Origins of Saudi theater ==
The origins of Saudi theatre can be traced back to shows performed by students in schools under the supervision of the Ministry of Knowledge, which later became the Ministry of Education. In 1974, the Society of Culture and Arts formed, and theatre evolved. Universities and societies held competitions, brought in academic directors, and conducted workshops to nurture students’ talent.

== Saudi playwrights ==
Playwriting began way before the emergence of theater itself in Saudi Arabia. The first ever written script emerged in 1932, authored by poet Hussain Abdullah Siraj and titled "He Who Wrongs Himself (Al-Zalim li-Nafsih). "Abdullah Siraj also wrote "Jamil Buthaina" in 1942 as well as the play "Passion of Birth (Gharam al-Wilada)" in 1952.

Between 1960 and 1970, plays transformed into social dramas that were performed for all members of society, with plays such as "Al-Ghaws (The Diver)" and "Every Oppressor Has His Day (Lik Youm Ya Zalim)." In 1980, the Society of Culture and Arts showcased numerous plays, including Naser Al Mubarak's "House of Fiber (Bayt min Lif)".

=== Other notable literary playwrights include ===
- Ahmad Abdul Ghafur Attar, who wrote "The Migration (Al-Hijrah)" in 1946 and "The Epic (Al-Malhamah)" in 1964.
- Abdullah Abdul Jabbar, who wrote "Uncle Sahnun (Al-‘Amm Sahnun)" in 1952 and "Mute Devils (Al-Shayatin Al-Khurs)" in 1954
- Mohammed Malibari, who wrote "The Conquest of Makkah (Fath Makkah) and Musaylimah the Deceitful (Musaylimah Al-Kadhdhab) in 1960.
- Abdullah Bogis and Essam Khogeer, who wrote Lonely Nights (El Liel Lama Khala).
- Ibrahim Hamdan, who wrote a women's play titled Monoclea.

== Saudi school theater ==
School theater is listed under the activities of the Saudi Ministry of Education, which periodically organizes theatrical festivals and competitions to encourage coordination among different schools and regions. The Ministry of Education also participates in external events at the Gulf and Arab-regional levels.

Saudi school theater's earliest history dates back to 1935, during the visit of King Abdulaziz bin Abdul Rahman Al Saud to Unayzah in Al-Qassim Province, where he attended a school play titled "Kisra and The Arab Delegation," as well as three other plays called "The Tea and the Cinnamon," “The Blind," and "Dialogue between Classical and Colloquial Arabic." It is widely held that the growth of Saudi Theatre was cemented in 1959 when Sheikh Saleh bin Saleh returned to Al-Qassim after spending time in one of the Arabian Gulf countries, where he worked reviving the School Theatre. He taught students how to act and assigned them roles. However, his efforts were curtailed by a lack of support, limiting his overall impact.

Saudi actor Abdel Aziz Al Hazza is often one of the first names encountered when researching the origins of Saudi school theatre. Abdel Aziz Al Hazza was called to Baghdad in 1955 to act in several theatrical roles. In the Western Region, plays were staged in the theater of Al Falah School, which was presented by Abdullah Khoja. In 1960, the first theater center was established in Saudi Arabia by Ahmad Al-Siba’i.

1973 saw the first-ever play to be performed to the audience of Riyadh. The play was called "Doctor with a Stick (Tabib bil-Mish’ab)" and was actually a translation of a play by French playwright Moliere titled "Le Médecin malgré lui (The Doctor in Spite of Himself)." It was translated by Lebanese poet Elias Abu Shabaki, and the play was directed by Ibrahim Al-Hamdan, the president of the Saudi Arabian Society for Culture and Arts at the time.

== Saudi academic theater ==
The General Presidency of Youth Welfare (currently known as the Ministry of Sport) oversaw the management of sports clubs and contributed to reviving theater through various sports clubs. It established the Theatrical Arts Department and later supervised literary clubs and the Saudi Arabian Society for Culture and Arts after its inception. This led to the emergence of several plays and hundreds of new actors, revolutionizing the theatrical scene from the 1960s through to the 1980s. This culminated in the Presidency organizing an annual culture and arts festival, which lasted until 1984. The Folk Arts Club was established in Al-Ahsa in 1971 and was one of the first clubs to offer programs in music, theater, and other forms of art. In 1972, it was renamed the Society of Folk Arts. By 1974, it had become the first branch location outside Riyadh to join the Saudi Arabian Society for Culture and Arts. The club was founded by a group of artists from Al Ahsa, which included Abdulrahman Al-Hamad, Hasan Al-Abdi, Khalid Al-Hamidi, Abdulaziz Al-Marzuq, Salih Al-Tanem, Khalid Al-Khairullah, Umar Al-Ubaidi, and many others. In fact, Abdulrahman Al-Khuraiji listed more than a hundred artists in his book "The Birth of Saudi Theater," describing them as the first generation of that era of Saudi Theater, with most of the people listed having directly influenced the early theatrical movement.

In the early 1980s, the General Presidency of Youth Welfare decided to send a host of artists from various specializations – such as acting, directing, design, and writing – to study in Gulf, Arab, and foreign countries.

In 2012, Saudi Aramco, represented by the King Abdulaziz Center for World Culture, signed a deal with the National Youth Theater of Great Britain, hoping to attract experts in acting, direction, design, lighting, writing, and sound to train budding theater talent. Held in the Eastern Province in Dammam and Al-Ahsa, the workshop was intensive and saw about 100 attendees graduate across various different specialisms. The British organization returned in 2013 to offer both a beginner-level and a professional course in Dammam and Al-Ahsa, leading to the graduation of 80 more youngsters. Ten of the most exceptional graduates were chosen to be sent to the UK so they could gain invaluable cultural and theatrical experience. Upon their return to Saudi Arabia, Saudi Aramco produced the global play "One Thousand and Two Nights (Alf layla wa-laylatan)." As the play featured both British and Saudi actors, it supported the Center's key objective, which aimed to foster cultural exchange.

== Venues ==
There are several theaters in the kingdom. With a seating capacity of over 3000, the theater of King Fahd Cultural Center in Riyadh is considered the largest theater in Saudi Arabia by seating capacity; it has witnessed and hosted many theatre activities. Also, the theater of King Abdulaziz Center for World Culture (alternatively called Ithra) has around 900 seats; it opened in 2018.

== See also ==
- Culture of Saudi Arabia
