= 2021 in Saudi Arabia =

- Decades: 2000s; 2010s; 2020s; 2030s
- See also: Other events of 2021; History of Saudi Arabia

Events in the year 2021 in Saudi Arabia.

== Incumbents ==
- Monarch: Salman
- Crown Prince: Mohammad bin Salman

== Events ==
Ongoing — COVID-19 pandemic in Saudi Arabia

- 3 January – Saudi Arabia reopens its air, sea, and land borders, and resumes international passenger flights as well, after borders were closed in December to prevent the spread of the new variant of SARS-CoV-2 that originated in the UK. People arriving from South Africa, the United Kingdom, and other countries where the new variant is spreading are required to spend 14 days in another country and present a negative test result prior to entering Saudi Arabia.
- 4 January – The border between Qatar and Saudi Arabia reopens.
- 8 January – King Salman receives the first dose of Pfizer's vaccine in Neom.
- 16 January – Saudi Arabia's Foreign Minister Faisal bin Farhan Al Saud announces that Saudi Arabia will re-open its embassy in Qatar in the coming days, after a diplomatic crisis that saw the nations severing ties for three years.
- 4 February – U.S. President Joe Biden announces that the United States will end their support for Saudi Arabia in their intervention in Yemen. However, he also said the United States will continue targeting al-Qaeda operations in the country.
- 10 February –
  - The Houthis carry out a drone strike on Abha International Airport in Saudi Arabia, damaging a civilian aircraft. A Houthi spokesman says that the attack is in response to coalition airstrikes and other actions in Yemen.
  - The Saudi government releases women's rights activist Loujain al-Hathloul from prison, after being held in custody for almost three years. She will still be banned from traveling for the next five years, and has been placed on a three-year probation.
- 14 February – Saudi Arabia extends precautionary measures to reduce the spread of COVID-19, which restricts social gatherings to 20 people and suspends all events and parties, for another 20 days.
- 15 February – The Houthis say that they have struck Saudi Arabia's Abha International Airport and King Abdulaziz International Airport in Jeddah with drones. A Houthi spokesman said on Twitter that the attacks halted operations in the airports for two hours. The Saudi-led coalition says that it intercepted drones heading towards the kingdom but did not confirm the attacks.
- 18 February – Saudi Arabia's Food and Drug Authority approves the use of the Oxford–AstraZeneca vaccine.
- 26 February – The Biden administration releases a previously classified intelligence report on the assassination of Saudi dissident journalist Jamal Khashoggi, confirming that Saudi Crown Prince Mohammad bin Salman had approved of the assassination.
- 27 February – 2021 missile attacks in Saudi Arabia: Saudi Arabia intercepts a ballistic missile attack over its capital Riyadh and bomb-laden drones targeting the southern province of Jizan, both of which were launched by Yemen's Houthi rebels backed by Iran.
- 2 March – Saudi Minister of Health Tawfig Al-Rabiah announces that all pilgrims must be vaccinated against COVID-19 in order to do the Hajj to Mecca.
- 6 March – Saudi Arabia confirms that it will ease COVID-19-related restrictions in entertainment and events and will reopen cinemas, gyms, and sport centres beginning on March 7.
- 7 March – In retaliation for yesterday's drone attacks against the kingdom, the Saudi-led coalition conducts airstrikes against the Houthis in the Yemeni capital Sanaa. There have been no reports of any immediate casualties.
- 19 March – A Houthi drone strike on a Saudi Aramco oil refinery in the capital Riyadh causes a large fire. The Houthis say that they launched six drones at a Saudi Aramco facility and vow to continue operations against Saudi Arabia as long as its aggression against Yemen continues.
- 22 March – Saudi Arabia proposes a ceasefire in Yemen to end the conflict against the Houthi movement.
- 23 March – Agnès Callamard, Special Rapporteur appointed by the United Nations Human Rights Council, reveals that a senior Saudi Arabian official twice threatened to have her "taken care of" if the UN did not obstruct her investigation of the assassination of Jamal Khashoggi. Khashoggi, who had been critical of the al-Saud dynasty, was murdered and dismembered by Saudi agents in the Saudi Arabian consulate in Istanbul in 2018 under what is believed to be the direct orders of Saudi Crown Prince Mohammed bin Salman.
- 5 April – A relative of Red Crescent worker Abdulrahman al-Sadhan says the Saudi Arabian Specialised Criminal Court has sentenced al-Sadhan to 20 years imprisonment, followed by a 20-year travel ban, in a secret trial. Rights groups allege the sentence is connected to an anonymous Twitter account on which al-Sadhan questioned Saudi positions on human rights issues.
- 10 April – Saudi Arabia executes three soldiers for "high treason" and "cooperating with the enemy" in Najran Province.
- 17 April – The Houthis say they have hit King Khalid Air Base, near the city of Khamis Mushait, in Saudi Arabia, with explosive drones. There is no immediate comment from the Saudi government.
- 19 April – An Iranian Foreign Ministry spokesman confirms a meeting between officials of the two countries and says that Iran has "always welcomed" dialogue with Saudi Arabia. Among the topics allegedly discussed in the meeting were the Vienna accord and a ceasefire in Yemen, where Saudi Arabia has militarily intervened since 2015. Saudi sources declined to comment on the meeting.
- 27 April – Saudi Arabia says that it detected and destroyed an incoming remote-controlled ship containing explosives in the Red Sea.
- 17 May – Saudi Arabia eases an international travel ban for those who have been vaccinated against COVID-19. However, citizens from 20 countries remain banned from entering the country and Saudi citizens are banned from travelling to 13 high-risk countries, either directly or indirectly.
- 18 May – Saudi Arabia and the United Arab Emirates both summon their Lebanese ambassadors after Lebanese Foreign Minister Charbel Wehbe accused the Gulf States of playing a role in the rise of ISIL in a heated exchange with a Saudi guest during an interview yesterday. Wehbe has since apologized for his remarks.
- 8 June – Syrian opposition group Free Officers Movement reports that Saudi Arabia is close to reaching a re-normalization deal with Syrian President Bashar al-Assad, seeing it as vital to reducing Iranian influence in the region.
- 12 June – Saudi Arabia bans foreign travellers for the second consecutive year for the Hajj pilgrimage, only allowing a maximum of 60,000 citizens and residents between the ages of 18 and 65 who have been vaccinated and are free of chronic diseases to take part in it.
- 18 June – The Biden administration removes eight Patriot anti-missile batteries from Saudi Arabia, Jordan, Kuwait, and Iraq, removes the THAAD anti-missile defense system from Saudi Arabia, and announces that most jet squadrons and hundreds of American troops will be withdrawn from the region. The changes come in light of both de-escalating tensions with Iran and the administration changing its focus on countering China.
- 19 June – Saudi air defenses destroy six armed drones late in the evening, bringing the total of armed drones destroyed during the day to 17. A Houthi spokesman says that one drone was launched at Khamis Mushait while the Saudi air defenses say that two other drones toward Khamis Mushait were intercepted and that eight other drones were also launched toward the south of the kingdom.
- 27 June – Saudi Arabia releases two women's rights activists, Samar Badawi and Nassima al-Sadah, after they completed and served their sentences. Both women were detained in July 2018 along with a dozen other activists. Human rights group welcome the release, with Human Rights Watch praising the women's activism.
- 30 June – Saudi Arabian state-run news channel Al Arabiya reports that authorities seized a shipment of 4.5 million Captagon amphetamine pills, smuggled inside several orange cartons, at a port in Jeddah.
- 11 July – In his first official overseas trip since assuming power last year, Omani Sultan Haitham bin Tariq meets with King Salman of Saudi Arabia in Neom for two days to discuss a peace initiative in Yemen, and strengthen economic and investment agreements between Saudi Arabia and Oman. Saudi media reports it is also Salman's first face-to-face meeting with a world leader since the COVID-19 pandemic began.
- 18 July – OPEC+ members, particularly Saudi Arabia and the United Arab Emirates, reach an agreement to increase oil production, ending disputes that caused prices to reach their highest level since 2014. Per the terms of the agreement, Russia will increase its production from 11 million barrels to 11.5 million by May 2022, while the other members will increase their production by 400,000 barrels per day starting in August.
- 1 August – Saudi Arabia lifts its travel restrictions for the first time since March 2020 for tourists who have been vaccinated against COVID-19 using government-approved vaccines. Vaccinated travelers must register themselves on the data registration portal introduced by the Ministry of Tourism, which also requires a negative PCR test from the previous 72 hours.
- 3 August – Saudi foreign minister Faisal bin Farhan Al Saud says that he "sees an emboldened Iran acting in a negative manner around the Middle East, endangering shipping, arming the Houthis and contributing to a political deadlock in Lebanon". Al Saud further stated that Saudi Arabia supports any talks with Iran "as long as it ensures that Iran will not now nor ever get nuclear weapons".
- 31 August – A drone attack against the Abha International Airport in Abha, Saudi Arabia, injures eight people.
- 4 September – Two ballistic missiles that targeted the cities of Najran and Jizan are intercepted by Saudi Arabia. A third missile is intercepted over the city of Dammam, with shrapnel from the third missile injuring two children and damaging 14 homes.
- 11 September – The Federal Bureau of Investigation releases its first document of the September 11 attacks and allegations of Saudi Arabia support for the hijackers following an executive order signed by President Joe Biden.
- 22 September – King Salman of Saudi Arabia insists on the "importance of keeping the Middle East free of weapons of mass destruction ... and support international efforts aiming at preventing Iran from having nuclear weapons". Salman also accused Yemen's Houthis of launching attacks against the kingdom despite proposed ceasefires by Saudi Arabia.
- 17 October – Saudi Arabia eases its COVID-19-related restrictions, lifting mandatory social distancing requirements as well as a requirement to wear face masks outdoors.
- 27 October – Saudi Arabia summons the Lebanese ambassador over "offensive" remarks about the war in Yemen made by Lebanese information minister George Kurdahi.
- 29 October – Saudi Arabia recalls its ambassador to Lebanon and demands for Lebanon to reciprocate the action over "insulting" remarks about the war in Yemen made by Lebanese information minister George Kurdahi.
- 1 December – Saudi Arabia reports its first case of the SARS-CoV-2 Omicron variant in a citizen who travelled from North Africa.
- 21 December – The Saudi-led coalition launches airstrikes on Sanaa International Airport in the Yemeni capital Sanaa. The air raid targeted six sites, including places used for "launching drone attacks", according to a statement from the coalition.
- 24 December – The Houthis launch a missile strike on the Saudi Arabian city of Jizan, killing two people and injuring seven more.

== Deaths ==
- 7 January – Hussein Bakry Gazzaz, 95, cosmetics businessman
- 12 January – Khalid bin Abdullah Al Saud, 84, royal, conglomerate magnate (Mawarid Holding) and horse stable owner (Juddmonte)
- 14 January – Sheikh Ali Jaber, 44, Islamic cleric
- 30 January – Turki bin Nasser Al Saud, 72, prince and military officer
- 23 February – Ahmed Zaki Yamani, 90, politician, minister of petroleum and mineral resources (1962–1986)
- 29 April – Hassan Dardir, 82, actor
- 18 May – Abdul Khaleq Alghanem, 63, film and TV director (Tash ma Tash)
- 6 June – Mansour Ojjeh, 68, French-Saudi Arabian entrepreneur
- 18 August – Abdul Hamid AbuSulayman, 84, Islamic scholar and educationist, rector of the IIUM (1989–1999)
- 10 September – Dalal bint Saud Al Saud, 63–64, royal and philanthropist
- 12 October – Musa al-Qarni, 67, Islamic cleric

== See also ==
- Saudi Arabia
- History of Saudi Arabia
- Outline of Saudi Arabia
