= 2014 in Saudi Arabia =

- Decades: 1990s; 2000s; 2010s; 2020s; 2030s
- See also: Other events of 2014; History of Saudi Arabia

The following lists events in 2014 in Saudi Arabia.

== Incumbents ==
- Monarch: Abdullah
- Crown Prince: Salman

== Events ==
=== January ===
- January 20 - Two car bombs hit a rebel-held post on the Syrian border with Turkey, killing at least 16 people amidst continuing fighting between Turkey-supported rebels and Saudi-supported rebels.

=== February ===
- February 8 - A hotel fire in Medina, kills fifteen Egyptian pilgrims with 130 also injured.

=== March ===
- March 7 - The Saudi Arabian government designates the Muslim Brotherhood and al-Qaeda among others as terrorist groups and warns that people joining them could face 30 years in prison.
- March 27 - Prince Muqrin bin Abdulaziz Al Saud is confirmed as second-in-line to the Saudi Arabian throne.

=== April ===
- April 21 - Five people are sentenced to death and 37 others given prison sentences for their roles in the 2003 bombings in Riyadh.
- April 22 - The Health Minister of Saudi Arabia, Abdullah bin Abdulaziz Al Rabiah, is dismissed as the Middle East respiratory syndrome coronavirus rages in the nation, killing 81 people to date.
- April 27 - Saudi Arabia reports eight more deaths and 16 more cases in the latest outbreak of MERS.

=== May ===
- May 3 - The first U.S. case of MERS is reported in Munster, Indiana, of someone who travelled to Saudi Arabia.
- May 19 - Saudi Arabia closes its embassy in Tripoli over security concerns in Libya.

=== June ===
- June 3 - Saudi Arabia announces 113 previously unreported cases of MERS, revises the death toll to 282, and fires its minister of health.

=== July ===
- July 3 - Saudi Arabia deploys 30,000 soldiers to its border with Iraq after Iraqi government forces withdrew from the area.

=== August ===
- August 6 - Saudi Arabia grants Lebanon US$1 billion to help the country in its conflict with self-declared jihadist fighters on the border with Syria.
- August 6 - The World Health Organization reports that 932 have died from the latest outbreak of the Ebola virus with a man reportedly dying of the disease in Jeddah after a business trip to Sierra Leone.

=== September ===
- September 2 - Saudi Arabian authorities announce they have arrested 88 people on suspicions of being part of an al-Qaeda cell and plotting attacks inside and outside the kingdom.

=== October ===
- October 15 - Popular Saudi Shia Sheikh Nimr al-Nimr sentenced to death by Saudi court that tries terrorists and human rights activists.

=== December ===
- December 7 - The Saudi Interior Ministry arrests 135 on terrorism offences, including dozens suspected of links to Islamic State of Iraq and the Levant.
