= 2006 in Saudi Arabia =

- Decades: 1980s; 1990s; 2000s; 2010s; 2020s
- See also: Other events of 2006; History of Saudi Arabia

The following lists events that happened during 2006 in Saudi Arabia.

== Incumbents ==
- Monarch: Abdullah
- Crown Prince: Sultan

== Events ==
=== January ===
- January 26 – Saudi Arabia withdraws its ambassadors to Denmark, due to the Muhammad cartoons.

== Deaths ==
=== June ===
- June 20 – Sa'd ibn Junaydil, historical geographer. (b. 1915)
