= Al-Shamrani =

Al-Shamrani is an Arabic surname that is given to those who are a part of the Arabic tribe known as “Shamran” that exists in the southern part of modern-day Saudi Arabia.

Notable people with the surname include:

- Nasser Al-Shamrani, Saudi footballer
- Rashid Al Shamrani, Saudi actor
