= Mohammed Al-Mfarah =

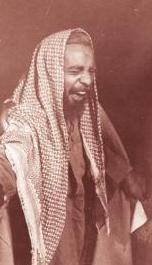
- Born: May 20, 1945; Al-Zilfi, Saudi Arabia
- Died: January 23, 2018 (aged 72); Riyadh
- Occupation: Actor
- Years active: 1964–2018

Mohammed Al-Mfarah, also known as Abu Mesamah (Arabic: محمد المفرح; May 20, 1945 – January 23, 2018) was a Saudi Arabian actor, writer, director and producer.

== Career ==
He started his career in 1964, after the opening of Saudi TV in 1965, He participated in several TV series. He worked at the ministry of health and submitted his resignation in 1975. He performed along actors Saad Khader and Mohammad Al-Ali.

== Some acting works ==
=== Series ===
- Al-Saknat Fe Klobna (English: The inhabitants in our hearts)
- Secretary in the House with Saad Khader
- Ahtarq Al-Samah (English: Candle burning)
- Abo Samah Fe Fanaq Al-Samrine (English: Abu Samah in Al-Samaren Hotel)

=== Plays ===
- Al-Mohsan (English: Enhanced) (2004)
- Bokor Wa kolampor (English: Incense and Kualalumpur)
