= Awdat Asoid =

- Promotional poster
- Also known as: Ásweed's Return
- عودة عصويد
- Directed by: Adnan Ibrahim
- Starring: Nasir Al-Gasabi; Abdullah Al-Sadhan; Mohammad Al-Ali; Rashid Al Shamrani
- Country of origin: Saudi Arabia
- Original language: Arabic
- No. of seasons: 1
- No. of episodes: 7

Production
- Executive producer: ARA of artistic production
- Camera setup: Multi-camera
- Running time: 40 minutes

Original release
- Release: 1985 – 1985

Ásweed's Return (Arabic: عودة عصويد) is one of the most famous Saudi television series in the Arab world. This series was produced in 1985, by ARA of artistic production, directed by Adnan Ibrahim (Iraqi director) and authored by Mohammed Al-Tawayan, both the participated from Saudi Arabia and Syria. Although the series is short, it was thoroughly enjoyed by its viewers.

== Starring ==
- Mohammed Al-Tawayan
- Mohammad Al-Ali
- Muna Wassef
- Rashid Al Shamrani
- Nasir Al-Gasabi
- Abdullah Al-Sadhan
- Mohammed Al-Kanhal
- Amanah Wali
- Khalid Al-Salm
- Salwa Noor al-Din
- Khaled Sami

== Direction ==
- Adnan Ibrahim
