= 2011 in Saudi Arabia =

- Decades: 1990s; 2000s; 2010s; 2020s; 2030s
- See also: Other events of 2011; History of Saudi Arabia

The following lists events that will happen during 2011 in Saudi Arabia.

== Culture ==
- Abdullatif Al Fozan Award is established.

== Incumbents ==
- Monarch: Abdullah
- Crown Prince:
  - until 22 October: Sultan
  - 22 October-29 October: vacant
  - since 29 October: Nayef
