= 2017 in Saudi Arabia =

- Decades: 1990s; 2000s; 2010s; 2020s; 2030s
- See also: Other events of 2017; History of Saudi Arabia

The following lists events in the year 2017 in Saudi Arabia.

== Incumbents ==
- Monarch: Salman
- Crown Prince: Muhammad bin Nayef (until 21 June), Mohammad bin Salman (since 21 June)

== Events ==
=== January ===
- January 10 - Iran announces to have finally received the invitation by Saudi Arabia to discuss bilateral talk on Hajj 2017 with the Iranian delegation expected to travel to Saudi Arabia on February 23.
- January 21 - Two suicide bombers detonate explosives in Jeddah during a confrontation with Saudi security forces.

=== February ===
- February 12 - A Saudi helicopter in Yemen bombs a vehicle in Aden, wounding 3 Yemeni soldiers.

=== April ===
- April 18 - Twelve Saudi military officers die when a Black Hawk crashes in Yemen's Ma'rib Governorate.
- April 22 - King Salman issues royal decrees for financial allowances to civil servants and military personnel in response to the drop in oil prices.
- April 25 - Saudi Arabia is elected to the United Nations Commission on the Status of Women along with eleven other countries despite "being ranked by human rights experts as one of the worst for gender equality".
- April 30 - Saudi Arabia announces the arrest of 46 alleged militants responsible for the summer 2016 bombing of Al-Masjid an-Nabawi, Medina.

=== May ===
- May 20 - US President Donald Trump visits Saudi Arabia and signs an arms deal with the kingdom worth more than US$100 billion. He is welcomed after dismissing previous President Barack Obama's vision for the region.

=== June ===
- June 5 - Saudi Arabia leads a wave of diplomatic severs to ties with Qatar along with the United Arab Emirates, Bahrain, Egypt, the Maldives, Libya and the internationally recognised government of Yemen, including the expulsion of Qatari citizens and cutting off all land, air and sea connections. The reasons stated were "national security", "media incitement" and Qatari support of Iran.
- June 8 - A joint statement by the Saudi-led bloc labels 59 people and 12 organisations linked with Qatar on a "terror list".
- June 14 - Egypt's parliament approves the transfer of two Red Sea islands, Tiran and Sanafir, to Saudi Arabia attracting public criticism.
- June 18 - A Saudi air raid in Yemen's Saada Governorate, held by the Houthis, kills 24 civilians in a market.
- June 21 - King Salman names his 31-year-old son Mohammed bin Salman as crown prince, displacing the 57-year-old Mohammed bin Nayef in the succession to the Saudi Arabian throne, and dismissing bin Nayef from his post as interior minister. Bin Salman, formerly the deputy crown prince, enjoyed a swift rise in political power. The move marks the first time a member of the third generation is named as successor. The moves upends the Saudi political order and is seen as a major shift.
- June 25 - Bahrain officially publishes the list by the Saudi bloc of demands from Qatar, which Turkey calls unlawful.

=== July ===
- July 31 - Qatar launches a complaint to the World Trade Organization about the boycott led by Saudi Arabia with the parties having 60 days to settle it before WTO litigation.

=== August ===
- August 23 - Saudi airstrikes in Yemen's capital of Sana'a kills 35 people.

=== September ===
- September 8 - The Emir of Qatar telephones Crown Prince Mohammed bin Salman to discuss resolving the diplomatic crisis between the two countries.
- September 9 - Saudi Arabia suspends any dialogue with Qatar, accusing the Emir of distorting facts during media reports of yesterday's call.
- September 14 - At least 16 Saudis perceived as dissidents are arrested by Saudi security forces. The Saudi government asserted that those rounded up were funded by foreign adversaries to undermine the Saudi monarchy; critics viewed the raids as part of an effort by Crown Prince Mohammed bin Salman to consolidate his power.
- September 20 - Saudi Arabia lifts a ban, in place since 2013, on internet calls.
- September 26 - King Salman issues a royal decree to allow the government to issue driver's licenses by women by June 24, 2018.

=== October ===
- October 5 - King Salman visits Russia's Kremlin to discuss with Russian President Vladimir Putin oil prices and the Syrian Civil War.
- October 7 - A gunman opens fire at the Al-Salam Royal Palace in Jeddah, killing two guards and injuring another three. The gunman was gunned down by security guards.
- October 25 - Crown Prince Mohammed bin Salman announces that a majority of Saudis want a return to moderate Islam with 70% of the kingdom being under 30 and welcoming the reforms.
- October 29 - Saudi Arabia announces that starting in 2018, women will be allowed to enter sports stadiums.

=== November ===
- November 1 - A Saudi airstrike on a market in Yemen's Sahar District kills 26 people.
- November 3 - Lebanese prime minister Saad Hariri unexpectedly travels to Saudi Arabia on November 3 and abruptly resigns his office the following day. It is unclear whether Hariri's action was freely done, "whether he was in effect a hostage of the Saudis; or whether they had pressured him to resign as part of a broader strategy to increase pressure on their regional rival, Iran."
- November 4 - A ballistic missile, the Burquan 2H, is fired by Houthi forces in Yemen; the missile is intercepted over the King Khalid International Airport close to Riyadh. Saudi Arabia alleges that Iran supplied the weapon and terms it an "act of war"; Iran denied the allegation. The Saudi-Iranian dispute raises regional tensions. Meanwhile, in Saudi Arabia, eleven Saudi princes—including billionaire Prince Alwaleed bin Talal, one of the world's wealthiest men and a nephew of the king—are arrested on orders of Crown Prince Mohammed bin Salman, who hours earlier had been appointed by the king as the head of a new "anti-corruption committee" with sweeping powers. Four ministers and a number of former ministers are also detained. The purge surprised observers and was widely seen as a bid by the crown prince to consolidate power.
- November 6 - Investors react poorly to the arrest of Al-Waleed bin Talal, one of the wealthiest men in the world.
- November 7 - Saudi Arabia accuses Iran of aggression and supporting the Houthis' attempt to launch a ballistic missile into Riyadh.
- November 9 - Saudi Arabia's attorney general announces that $100 billion was embezzled in recent decades during an anti-corruption crackdown.
- November 14 - Patriarch Bechara Boutros al-Rahi, leader of the Lebanon-based Maronite Church, makes a rare visit to Saudi Arabia, where he meets with King Salman and Crown Prince Mohammed bin Salman. The visit comes at a time of high tension between Saudi Arabia and Lebanon.

=== December ===
- December 11 - The Saudi government announces plans to license commercial movie theaters, ending a 35-year-ban. Saudi authorities make clear that films allowed to be shown would have to conform to Islamic law. Censorship is expected in films that are allowed to be screened.
- December 16 - Billionaire businessman Sabih al-Masri, a Saudi citizen of Palestinian origin who is the chairman of the Jordan-based Arab Bank, is detained and questioned by Saudi authorities while traveling in Riyadh.

== Deaths ==
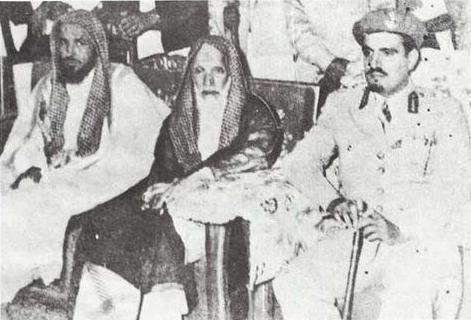
Mishaal bin Abdulaziz Al Saud (right)

- 14 January – Mohammed bin Faisal Al Saud, royal and businessman (born 1937).
- 3 May – Mishaal bin Abdulaziz Al Saud, prince (born 1926)
- 13 July – Abdul Rahman bin Abdulaziz Al Saud, Saudi Prince (born 1931)
