= 2010 in Saudi Arabia =

- Decades: 1990s; 2000s; 2010s; 2020s; 2030s
- See also: Other events of 2010; History of Saudi Arabia

The following lists events that happened during 2010 in Saudi Arabia.

== Incumbents ==
- Monarch: Abdullah
- Crown Prince: Sultan

== Events ==
- In February, the Saudi government allowed female lawyers to represent women in family court.
- In April, a new form of ID card was released that allowed women to travel to countries within the Gulf Cooperation Council without needing male permission to apply for it. However, permission was still required for them to travel abroad.
