= The Butterfly Effect: Azzam =

- Directed by: Ahmed Munir
- Story by: Abdulrahman Al-Shaya; Hani Titawi
- Produced by: Salem Al-Juaidi
- Starring: Rashid Al Shamrani; Ali Al Humaidi; Marzouq Al Ghamdi; Taif Saad; Abdulmalik Al Ati
- Production companies: Alshaya Creative; MAS Studios
- Distributed by: Qanawat
- Release dates: 10 September 2026 (Saudi Arabia); 24 September 2026 (Arab World)
- Running time: 90 minutes
- Country: Saudi Arabia
- Language: Arabic

The Butterfly Effect: Azzam (Arabic: آثر الفراشة: عزام) is a 2026 Saudi AI-generated film directed by Ahmed Munir and written by Abdulrahman Al-Shaya and Hani Titawi. It is the first Saudi AI-generated film

== Plot ==
Azzam is an introverted 12-year-old who's addicted to his smartphone. Azzam has recently lost his father. During a family trip to Asir, he is suddenly transported to mysterious world of butterflies. Azzam tries to find himself in a coming-out-age journey exploring patriotism, courage, and the search for happiness within that world.

== Voice cast ==
- Rashid Al Shamrani
- Ali Al Humaidi
- Marzouq Al Ghamdi
- Mohammed Al Juaid
- Aseel Al Shehabi
- Afnan Al Khoder
- Taif Saad
- Abdulmalik Al Ati
- Abdullah Al Juaidi
- Mona Al Mas

== Release ==
The movie was released in Saudi Arabia on September 10, 2026. With a planned release in rest of the Arab world on the 24th.

== Reception ==
Following the release of the movie’s trailer on March 2026, it highly criticized for its use of generative AI. Mohammed Al Juaid, the creative director and voice actor, firmly rejected these claims. Al Juaid stated that it was a “hand-drawn” 3D-animated film that took two and a half years to produce. Although confirmed the usage of generative AI in some aspects.
