= 2009 in Saudi Arabia =

- Decades: 1980s; 1990s; 2000s; 2010s; 2020s
- See also: Other events of 2009; History of Saudi Arabia

The following lists events occurring in 2009 in Saudi Arabia.

== Incumbents ==
- Monarch: Abdullah
- Crown Prince: Sultan

== Events ==
- The first female minister, Norah Al Faiz, was appointed to the Saudi Arabian government.
- In September 2009, King Abdullah University of Science and Technology opened its first coeducational campus.
- Flooding in Jeddah killed over 120 people with another 350 injured.
