= 2013 in Saudi Arabia =

- Decades: 1990s; 2000s; 2010s; 2020s; 2030s
- See also: Other events of 2013; History of Saudi Arabia

The following lists events in 2013 in Saudi Arabia.

== Incumbents ==
- Monarch: Abdullah
- Crown Prince: Salman

== Events ==
=== January ===
- 9 January - Despite international protest, Sri-Lankan maid Rizana Nafeek is executed in Saudi Arabia for killing an infant in her care.
- 11 January - King Abdullah appoints 30 women to the Shura council.

=== March ===
- 11 March - Saudi Arabia punishes two activists for voicing opinion

=== June ===
- 29 June - Saudi Arabia changes weekend to Friday/Saturday

=== December ===
- 16 December - A new counterterrorism law is passed by Saudi Council of ministers
