= Mohammad Al-Ali =

Muhammad Al-Ali محمد العلي
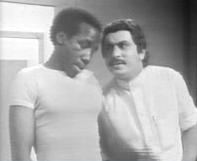
- Saad Khader from left and right Mohammad Al-Ali in 1979.
- Born: Mohammed Ali Al-Salem; July 17, 1949; Riyadh, Saudi Arabia
- Died: January 3, 2002 (aged 52); Riyadh, Saudi Arabia
- Occupation: Actor
- Years active: 1965-2002

Mohammad Al-Ali (Arabic: محمد العلي;, July 17, 1949 - January 3, 2002) was a Saudi actor. He was known for his roles in comedy and tragedy.

== Career ==
He started his acting career in 1965 in Play called "Al-Mozifon" (English: Fakes), his Career ended in 2001 in series called "Tam Al-Ayam (English: taste of days) on Saudi TV .

== Life ==
Al-Ali was born Abdullah bin Ali Al Salem in Riyadh on July 17, 1949. He first studied in Saudi Arabia then moved to Damascus and Cairo. He returned to Riyadh in 1962-1965 where he joined the Saudi television before studying Electronic Engineering in the United Kingdom for four years until 1970. In the same years he worked as English announcer in Saudi Arabian Airlines. Al-Ali married and had three boys.

Al-Ali died from respiratory disease on January 3, 2002.

== Some acting works ==
=== Series ===
- Gadan tasraq Al- Samas (English: Tomorrow the sun shines)
- hikyah mathal (English: Story such as)
- Ayam la tunsa (English: Unforgettable Days) in 1974
- Awdat Aswayd (English: Asoid's Return) 1985

=== Plays ===
- Al-Mozifon (English: Fakes)
- Tahat Al-Karsi (English: Under the chairs) with Rashid Al Shamrani, Nasir Al-Gasabi, Abdullah Al-Sadhan
