= 2002 in Saudi Arabia =

- Decades: 1980s; 1990s; 2000s; 2010s; 2020s
- See also: Other events of 2002; History of Saudi Arabia

The following lists events during 2002 in Saudi Arabia.

== Incumbents ==
- Monarch: Fahd
- Crown Prince: Abdullah

== Events ==
=== March ===
- March 11 - All Gulf states back up with Saudi Arabia's peace plan for Israel.
