= 2015 in Saudi Arabia =

- Decades: 1990s; 2000s; 2010s; 2020s; 2030s
- See also: Other events of 2015; History of Saudi Arabia

The following lists events that happened during 2015 in the Kingdom of Saudi Arabia.

== Incumbents ==
- Monarch: Abdullah (until 23 January), Salman (ascended 23 January)
- Crown Prince:
  - until 23 January: Salman
  - 23 January-29 April: Muqrin
  - since 29 April: Muhammad bin Nayef

== Events ==
=== January ===
- January 5 - Two Saudi Arabian border guards are killed near the border with Iraq.
- January 9 - Saudi Arabia sentences a human rights blogger to ten years imprisonment and 1,000 lashes after being found guilty of insulting Islam.
- January 23 - Custodian of the Two Holy Mosques King Abdullah of Saudi Arabia dies. His half brother Salman of Saudi Arabia succeeds him. His half brother Muqrin bin Abdulaziz Al Saud becomes the Crown Prince.

=== March ===
- March 15 - The US closes its embassy and consulates in Saudi Arabia for security concerns.
- March 25 – 2015 military intervention in Yemen: Saudi Arabia begins carrying out airstrikes in neighbouring Yemen.

=== April ===
- April 9 - At least 2 policemen shoot dead in Riyadh.

=== May ===
- May 22 - A Shia mosque is attacked by a suicide bomber in Qatif, killing 22 to 30 people.
- May 29 - The Islamic State of Iraq and the Levant claims responsibility for another attack on a Shia mosque in Dammam.

=== September ===
- September 11 - Mecca crane collapse A crawler crane toppled over onto the Masjid al-Haram, the Grand Mosque in Mecca, Saudi Arabia. 111 people were killed and 394 injured. The city was preparing for the Hajj pilgrimage.
- September 24 - 2015 Mina disaster, 782 people to suffocate and be crushed to death while injuring 934 others during the annual Hajj pilgrimage in Mina

=== December ===
- December 24 - At least 25 people have been killed and 107 injured in a fire at a hospital in Jizan, Saudi Arabia.

=== Scheduled ===
- Municipal elections are planned.
