= 2005 in Saudi Arabia =

- Decades: 1980s; 1990s; 2000s; 2010s; 2020s
- See also: Other events of 2005; History of Saudi Arabia

The following lists events that happened during 2005 in Saudi Arabia.

== Incumbents ==
- Monarch: Fahd (until 1 August), Abdullah (starting 1 August)
- Crown Prince: Abdullah (until 1 August), Sultan (starting 1 August)

== Events ==
=== January ===
- January 14 - Saudi Arabia's supreme judicial council announced that the ritual of the Day of Arafa would take place Wednesday rather than Thursday as expected. This means that Eid ul-Adha will begin a day earlier than thought.

=== April ===
- April 12 - Grand Mufti Sheikh Abdul Aziz al-Sheikh rules that forcing women to marry against their will is against Islam.

=== May ===
- May 27 - The King Fahd of Saudi Arabia, has been taken to hospital, overtly for tests; however, the BBC quotes an unofficial source who claims the King has water in his lungs.

=== July ===
- July 20 - Saudi Arabian long-time ambassador to USA, prince Bandar bin Sultan, resigns for "personal reasons".

=== August ===
- August 3 - The new King Abdullah has been invested. Tony Blair and Jacques Chirac, along with many European Monarchs are present for the "bayaa" ceremony while George H. W. Bush and Dick Cheney will meet with the new King the following day.
- August 18 - A man described as al-Qaeda's leader in Saudi Arabia, Saleh Mohammed al-Aoofi, is killed in a shootout with police.

=== November ===
- November 11 - Saudi Arabia becomes a member of the World Trade Organization after twelve years of talks.
