= 2018 in Saudi Arabia =

- Decades: 1990s; 2000s; 2010s; 2020s; 2030s
- See also: Other events of 2018; History of Saudi Arabia

The following lists events in the year 2018 in Saudi Arabia.

== Incumbents ==
- Monarch: Salman
- Crown Prince: Mohammad bin Salman

== Events ==
=== January ===
- 1 January – Saudi Arabia introduces a 5% value-added tax (VAT) for the first time, with exemptions for basic necessities, medical, cultural, educational products, and financial services.
- 12 January – Women were allowed to gather at a football game for the first time due to easing of the strict gender separation rules.
- 24 January – Dozens of camels were disqualified from a beauty pageant near the capital of Riyadh following reports about injections of botox to make camels more attractive.
- Several men are arrested after a video allegedly showing a gay wedding circulated online.
- Columnist Salah al-Shehi is arrested and later sentenced to five years in prison for alleging corruption in the royal court.

=== February ===
- 26 February – Saudi Arabia appears before the UN Committee on the Elimination of Discrimination against Women to defend its record; the committee urged reforms including abolishing male guardianship and adopting a unified family code.

=== March ===
- 26 March – The Houthis launch a barrage of rockets at Saudi Arabia, killing an Egyptian man and leaving two others wounded in Riyadh.

=== April ===
- 30 April – VOX Cinemas opens Saudi Arabia's first multiplex cinema following the lifting of a 35-year cinema ban.

=== May ===
- 15 May – Authorities launch arrests of prominent women's rights activists, including Loujain al-Hathloul and Aziza al-Yousef, as part of a crackdown on the women's rights movement.
- 27 May – The Red Sea tourism project is incorporated as a closed joint-stock company.

=== June ===
- 24 June – The ban on women driving in Saudi Arabia is lifted, allowing women to legally drive across the Kingdom.
- Historian and women's rights advocate Hatoon al-Fassi is arrested after commenting on Crown Prince Mohammed bin Salman's reforms in the New York Times.

=== July ===
- Activists Samar Badawi and Nassima al-Sadah are arrested for opposing male guardianship laws.

=== August ===
- Saudi Arabia withdraws its ambassador from Canada, restricts trade and travel, and repatriates Saudis following Canadian calls for release of detained human rights activists.

=== September ===
- 17 September – The Red Sea Development forms a 12-member advisory board.
- Prosecutors formally request the death penalty for prominent dissident clerics Salman al-Awdah and Awad al-Qarni.

=== October ===
- 2 October – Saudi journalist and Washington Post columnist Jamal Khashoggi enters the Saudi consulate in Istanbul and is murdered. Turkish intelligence records and later releases the details implicating Saudi officials.
- 23 October – The Future Investment Initiative (FII) summit in Riyadh sees the signing of deals worth over $50 billion in energy and infrastructure sectors.

== Deaths ==
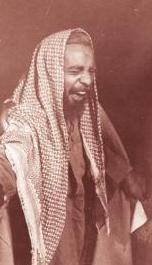
Mohammed Al-Mfarah

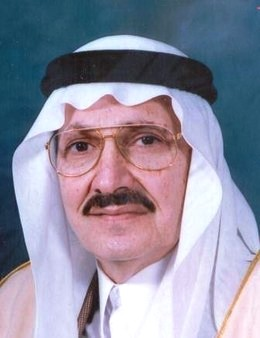
Talal bin Abdulaziz Al Saud

- 23 January – Mohammed Al-Mfarah, actor (b. 1945).
- 2 October – Jamal Khashoggi, journalist (b. 1958)
- 27 November – Sultan Al-Bargan, football player (b. 1983).
- 22 December – Talal bin Abdulaziz Al Saud, Prince (b. 1931).
