= 1934 in Saudi Arabia =

- Decades: 1920s; 1930s; 1940s; 1950s
- See also: Other events of 1934; History of Saudi Arabia

The following lists events that happened during 1934 in Saudi Arabia.

== Incumbents ==
- Monarch: Ibn Saud
- Crown Prince: Ibn Saud

== Events ==
=== June ===
- June 27 - North Yemen and Saudi Arabia conclude a peace treaty.
