= 1932 in Saudi Arabia =

- Decades: 1920s; 1930s; 1940s; 1950s
- See also: Other events of 1932; History of Saudi Arabia

The following lists events that happened during 1932 in Saudi Arabia.

== Incumbents ==
- Monarch: Ibn Saud (starting September 26)

== Events ==
=== Date unknown ===
- The Kingdom of Saudi Arabia was formed.
