= 2012 in Saudi Arabia =

- Decades: 1990s; 2000s; 2010s; 2020s; 2030s
- See also: Other events of 2012; History of Saudi Arabia

The following lists events that happened during 2012 in the Kingdom of Saudi Arabia.

== Incumbents ==
- Monarch: Abdullah
- Crown Prince: Nayef (until 16 June), Salman (since 16 June)

== Events ==
=== March ===
- March 7 - Sweden is reported to be helping Saudi Arabia construct plans for a weapons factory.
