= 2016 in Saudi Arabia =

- Decades: 1990s; 2000s; 2010s; 2020s; 2030s
- See also: Other events of 2016; History of Saudi Arabia

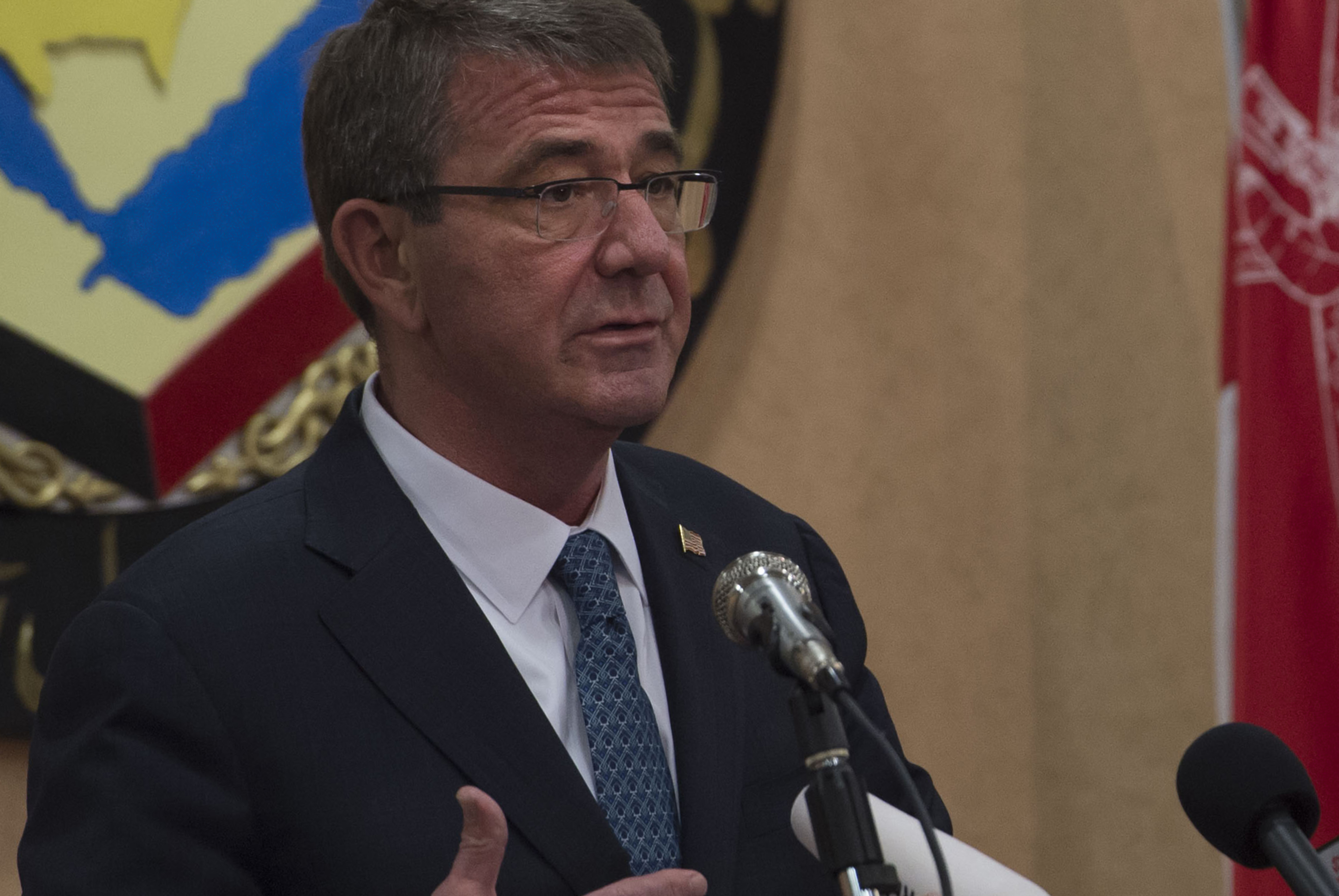
US Secretary of Defense Ash Carter speaks with reporters during a press conference with Gulf Cooperation Council Secretary General Abdullatif bin Rashid Al Zayani.

The following lists events that happened in 2016 in the Kingdom of Saudi Arabia.

== Incumbents ==
- Monarch: Salman
- Crown Prince: Muhammad bin Nayef

== Events ==
=== January ===
- January 2 - 47 alleged terrorists are executed by the Saudi state, including leader of the anti-government Shia movement, Sheikh Nimr al-Nimr.
- January 2 - The embassy of Saudi Arabia in Tehran, Iran, is ransacked and set on fire by protesters against al-Nimr's execution.
- January 3 - Saudi Arabia breaks off diplomatic relations with Iran after the events that happened on January 2.
- January 4 - Saudi Arabia announces it will end all air traffic and trade links with Iran, demanding Iran to "act like a normal country" before severed diplomatic relations can be restored.
- January 5 - The Islamic State of Iraq and the Levant threatens to destroy Saudi Arabia's Tarfiya and al-Ha'ir prisons, holding ISIL prisoners.
- January 12 - Saudi human rights activist Samar Badawi is arrested by Saudi police.

=== April ===
- April 16 - Mariam Fardous became the first ever Arab woman and only the third woman in history to dive in the North Pole.

=== October ===
- October 25 - Shooting left 2 security forces dead in Dammam city.

== Notable deaths ==
- 2 January – Nimr al-Nimr, Shia religious leader (born 1959).
- 2 January – Faris al-Zahrani, (born 1977).
