= Hussein Bakry Gazzaz =

Saudi Arabian businessman (1925–2021)

- Gazzaz Head Office
- Born: 1925; Makkah, Saudi Arabia
- Occupations: Businessman; Owner of Gazzaz Department Stores
- Spouse: Suraya

Hussein Bakry Gazzaz (Arabic: حسين بكري قزاز; 1925 – 7 January, 2021) was a Saudi Arabian businessman who founded the Gazzaz Department Stores chain in the Kingdom of Saudi Arabia.

== History ==
Gazzaz attended Tah'deer El Be'that school; however, he left school at the age of 13 to pursue employment. Gazzaz's first business, a small counter in the hallway of Bab Ziyadah in Mecca, was established in 1942. Gazzaz also worked for 2 years within the Saudi Ministry of Finance. Gazzaz gained experience and insight into diverse economic principles and business models through his employment within the Ministry of Finance.

In 1946, Gazzaz expanded his business to import well known brands of perfumes, making his company one of the first importers of perfumes in Saudi Arabia, at first he owned the rights to distribute French fragrance Lubin and Ca Train De Paris. The company holds distribution rights for several well known luxury watchmakers such as Cartier, Omega, Rado, Baume et Mercier, TAG Heuer.

As of May 2012, there were 35 Gazzaz Department Stores in KSA.
