= Saad Khader =

Saudi Arabian television actor, director and producer (born 1943)

Saad Khader سعد خضر
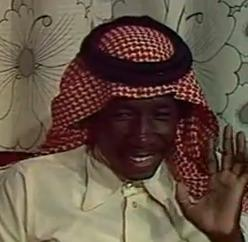
- Born: 3 July 1946 (age 80); Makkah, Saudi Arabia
- Occupation: Actor
- Years active: 1965–present

Saad Khader (Arabic: سعد خضر; born 3 July 1946) is a Saudi Arabian television actor, director and producer. He is the first man to present a Saudi film called Maw'id Ma' Majhool (English: Date with the unknown). He is considered as one of the greatest Saudi actors of all times.

== Career ==
Khader started his acting career in 1965, After the opening of Radio Riyadh in 1964, he participated in several programs, in 1965 he joined Saudi TV, in 1969 he participated in serial called secretary in the House, he was presented the first Saudi film called Mowad Ma Majhoal (English: Date with the unknown).

== Personal life ==
Khader was born Saad Sadoun Khader Farajallah in Makkah on 3 July 1946. He moved with his family to Riyadh. Before starting his acting career, he was a violinist in the Saudi army. Khader is married, having nine girls and three boys.

== Some acting works ==
=== Series ===
- Secarty fe al-biat (English: secretary in the House) (1969)
- Faraj Allah wa zaman (English: Faraj Allah and time) (1971)
- Ahlam Saedh y hassan (English: Sweet Dreams O Hasan) (1972)

=== Movies ===
- Farajallah Karib (English: Farajallah soon) 1967
- Al-Mozifon (Television movie) (English: Fake) with Mohammad Al-Ali
- Sarab Al-Ayam (English: Conflict with the days) with Samir Ghanem
- Mowad Ma Majhoal (English: Date with the unknown)
