= Hassan Dardir =

Saudi Arabia actor (1938–2021)

Hassan Dardir حسن دردير
- Born: November 13, 1938; Jeddah, Saudi Arabia
- Died: April 29, 2021 (aged 82)
- Occupation(s): Actor, presenter
- Years active: 1960–2021

Hassan Dardir (Arabic: حسن دردير; November 13, 1938 – April 29, 2021) was a Saudi Arabian actor.

== Works ==
=== Plays ===
- I am your brother Amin (1967)

=== Series TV ===
- Surprises in hotel (1971)
- Wonders architecture in Tunisia (1969)
- Songs in a sea aspirations (1969)

=== Movies ===
- Remorse (1966)
