= Musa al-Qarni =

Saudi cleric (died 2021)

Musa Al-Qarni (موسى بن محمد بن يحيى القرني; 1954 – 12 October 2021) was a Saudi Arabian Islamic scholar, academic, and lawyer. He was known for his conservative views on jihad and Western intervention in the Middle East, and was associated with the Islamist reformist current in Saudi Arabia. Al-Qarni was arrested in 2007 as part of a group of activists known as the "Jeddah Reformers" and sentenced to 20 years in prison. He died in custody in 2021 under circumstances described by human rights organizations as suspicious and violent.

== Early life and education ==
Al-Qarni was born in 1954 in Saudi Arabia. He pursued religious education and became a scholar of Islamic law. He also trained in law and held academic positions, establishing himself as a prominent preacher and legal professional.

== Political and religious views ==
Al-Qarni argued that armed jihad was a necessary and legitimate component of Islam when used to defend against aggression. He believed that fighting against aggression and tyranny, both from the Soviet Union and the United States, is a fundamental aspect of Islam. In public remarks, he criticized those who denied that Islam sanctioned the use of force, stating that the sword could be used when necessary:

We don't agree with those who disavow this completely and say that the religion [of Islam] doesn't use the sword. No. Islam uses the sword when there is no other alternative. Therefore wisdom, as the religious authorities say, consists in utilizing each thing in its proper place. If there is need for the sword, then it is wise to use the sword, and if the occasion requires kind words and outreach, then it is wise to utilize them.

He was vocally critical of U.S. military actions in the Middle East, particularly the invasion of Iraq. He described American forces as aggressors and stated that armed resistance against them was a form of legitimate jihad:

I think that fighting the Americans on the land of Iraq is jihad, that the Americans are aggressors, and that the [fighting] of Iraqis and Muslims against the Americans in Iraq constitutes a legitimate and obligatory defense. The Americans are the aggressors. "Those who came from Florida, from Washington, and so on - is Iraq their country? Is it their land? Is it their property? What brought them? How can we explain this? By any standard, this is aggression. "Nobody says that defense against aggression..."

He also stated:

The terrorists are these Jews and Christians who implement these policies through the use of force, repression, and tyranny, and to this end make use of planes, tanks, and all manner of deadly weapons.

In addition to his religious views, Al-Qarni supported political reform in Saudi Arabia. He advocated for a constitutional monarchy, greater protections for civil liberties, and public trials for detainees. He opposed arbitrary detention and reportedly submitted reform proposals to the royal family. He was also a friend of journalist Jamal Khashoggi.

== Arrest and imprisonment ==
On 2 February 2007, Al-Qarni was arrested along with a group of academics and clerics known as the "Jeddah Reformers". The group had been advocating for constitutional reform and greater civil rights.

On 22 November 2011, the Saudi Criminal Court sentenced Al-Qarni to 20 years in prison, followed by a travel ban of similar duration.

In May 2018, Al-Qarni had a stroke while in custody. According to reports, he was administered incorrect medication and transferred to a psychiatric hospital. Observers alleged that this was an attempt by the prison authorities to damage his intellectual credibility by portraying him as mentally unstable.

== Death ==
On 12 October 2021, Al-Qarni died in Dhahban Prison. Human rights groups reported that he had been beaten on the head and face with sharp objects, resulting in facial injuries and skull fractures that caused his death.
