= 2019 in Saudi Arabia =

- Decades: 1990s; 2000s; 2010s; 2020s; 2030s
- See also: Other events of 2019; History of Saudi Arabia

The following lists events in the year 2019 in Saudi Arabia.

== Incumbents ==
- Monarch: Salman
- Crown Prince: Mohammad bin Salman

== Events ==
=== January ===
- 5 January - Rahaf Mohammed al-Qunun was detained by Thai authorities whilst transiting through Bangkok airport, en route from Kuwait to Australia. She was attempting to flee her family and seek asylum in Australia because she says they subjected her to physical and psychological abuse and is concerned that she could face execution if deported back to her native Saudi Arabia.

=== February ===
- 5 February 2019 - The Saudi satellite SGS-1 was launched.
- 11 February - Crown Prince Mohammed bin Salman, officially inaugurated King Abdullah Port, the first fully privately owned, developed and operated port.
- 23 February - Princess Reema bint Bandar Al Saud was named Ambassador of Saudi Arabia to the United States, making her the first woman envoy in the country's history.

=== March ===
- 1 March - Through a royal decree, King Salman of Saudi Arabia revokes the citizenship of Hamza bin Laden, Osama bin Laden's son, who works in the Al-Qaeda terrorist organization.
- 27 March - Aramco signs share purchase agreement to acquire 70% majority stake in SABIC from the Public Investment Fund of Saudi Arabia for $69.1 billion in one of the biggest deals in the global chemical industry.

=== April ===
- 1 April - Crown Prince Mohammad bin Salman laid the foundation stone for the establishment of the Air War Center.
- 21 April - Four heavily armed attackers were killed in a failed terrorist attack on a Mabahith building in Zulfi, north of Riyadh.

=== May ===
- 30–31 May - Saudi Arabia hosted three historical summits in Makkah; the GCC Summit, the Arab Summit, and the Organization of Islamic Cooperation Summit.
- Makkah Document (2019) was declared in Makkah.

=== June ===
- 12 June 2019 - The Abha International Airport was attacked by the Yemen-based Houthi rebels using a cruise missile.

=== August ===
- 1 August - Saudi Arabia allowed women to travel abroad, register a divorce or a marriage, and apply for official documents without the consent of a male guardian.
- 11 August - The total number of pilgrims participated in 2019's Hajj season is 2,489,406.
- 17 August - Yemen's Houthi movement attacked Shaybah natural gas liquefaction facility by drones causing a small fire with no injuries.
- 21 August - Ibtisam Al-Shehri is the first woman who was appointed as a spokeswoman for the Ministry of education.
- 30 August - a new ministry for Industry and Mineral Resources was established.

=== September ===
- 14 September - Saudi Aramco oil facilities in Abqaiq and Khurais were targeted by a drone attack causing large fires but no casualties.
- 27–27 September - Saudi Arabia formally announced the issuance of the tourist visa to visitors from 49 countries for a fee of $80. The visa can be either obtained online (eVisa) or on arrival.
- 29 September - Houthi rebels claimed they have captured thousands of Saudi troops in fighting in Najran.

=== October ===
- 29–31 October - The annual Future Investment Initiative (FII) was held in Riyadh.

=== November ===
- 3 November - Saudi Aramco announced a plan to list its initial public offering (IPO) in the domestic stock exchange (Tadawul) which expected to be the world’s biggest listing.
- 5 November - Yemen government and separatists sign power sharing deal in Riyadh.
- 20 November - Saudi Arabia was elected to the executive board of UNESCO for 2019-2023.
- 22 November - Reema Juffali became the first woman Saudi racing driver to compete in an international racing competition in Saudi Arabia.
- 27 November - Saudi Arabia was elected to the membership of UNESCO World Heritage Committee.
