= Sa'd ibn Junaydil =

Saudi Arabian historian (1915–2006)

- سعد ابن جنيدل
- Born: 1915; Shaqra, Emirate of Nejd and Hasa
- Died: 20 June 2006 (aged 87); Taif, Mecca Province, Saudi Arabia
- Education: King Saud University
- Occupation: Historical geographer
- Writing career
- Language: Arabic
- Years active: 1972–2004

Sa'd bin Abdullah al-Junaydil, commonly known as Sa'd ibn Junaydil (Arabic: سعد ابن جنيدل, romanized: Saʻd ibn Junaydil; 1915 – 20 June 2006), was a Saudi Arabian historical geographer. Alongside Hamad Al-Jassir, Muhammad al-Ubudi and Abd al-Rahman al-Ansari, he is considered one of the first Saudi geographers in the 20th century. Al-Junaydil was born in Shaqra, Najd and graduated from King Saud University in 1972. He worked as a merchant, schoolteacher and headteacher until the 1970s. He had an interest in Najdi folklore, collecting artifacts and wrote several dictionaries and geographical encyclopedias from the 1970s until he died in Taif at the age of 87.

== Biography ==
Sa'd bin Abdullah bin Ibrahim Al-Junaydil was born in 1915 in Shaqra, Emirate of Nejd and Hasa. He began his studies at the old schools and kuttabs under ulema, studied the Qur'an, tafsirs and hadith and obtained an elementary certificate in his hometown. He worked in agriculture and trade with his father. His father was also a poet and had a library, and Al-Junaydil benefited greatly from his teachings. He started regular education late, as he was right-hand of his father in business.

Al-Junaydil continued his education in Dawadmi, southwest of his hometown, where his father had moved. In Dawadmi, he enrolled in the adult education system at the age of thirty, and obtained the intermediate certificate. One day he met his close friend and educator Sa'd Abu Moati in Riyadh, when he went there for commercial affairs. Abu Moati was at the time Director General of Education in Najd, so he made Al-Junaydil an offer to become teacher in Dawadmi, which Al-Junaydil accepted. Although he was an assistant in the management of the school, he also taught there at the intermediate level. He also took over the task of teaching religious subjects, for lack of another teacher, and he also taught Arabic grammar for the sixth grade of primary school. At the time of the exams he sat with his students to take the exam with them, to complete the educational certificate, as he wanted it to fulfill the governmental requirements for teachers. Later, Al-Junaydil took over the management and supervision of the secondary school, in addition to teaching Hadith for the second grade of secondary school and history for the third grade of secondary school, until 1970. He passed several training courses, including the school principal's course, but he refused to be nominated for other courses in Egypt and at the American University in Beirut, due to his family circumstances and his association with his merchant father. For the same reason, he rejected two nominations for the position of director of education in Al Atawilah in Al-Bahah Province, and director of education in Al Qunfudhah city in the Mecca Region.

Al-Junaydil joined the College of Arts at King Saud University in Riyadh, from which he obtained a Bachelor's degree in Arts from the Department of History in 1967. In 1972 he obtained a higher diploma in general education from the Faculty of Education of the same university. He started writing poetry on special occasions at an early age, and now began writing essays in newspapers. His first article was titled "To the Tribune of Criticism" in the Sawt Al-Hijaz newspaper. He published his first poem in Al-Yamamah magazine in the same year, and he also published some of his writings in the Al-Ishaa'a magazine before it was closed. After graduating, he published a number of geographical and historical researches in the Al-Arab magazine, and he also published a number of researches about Islamic education in the Al-Da'wah newspaper in Riyadh.

== Death ==
He was suffering from an illness that afflicted him at the end of his life. He traveled by plane from Riyadh to Taif to spend the summer away from the severe heat, but his illness worsened. He died in Taif on 20 June 2006 and his body was transferred to Mecca. Funeral rites were performed in the Great Mosque of Mecca on the afternoon of 21 June. In June 2011, Riyadh Municipality named a street after him in the Al-Sahafa neighborhood.

== Works ==
Al-Jandil wrote a number of multi-genre and topic books, which are:

- Arabic: المعجم الجغرافي للبلاد العربية السعودية, romanized: al-Muʻjam al-jughrāfī lil-bilād al-ʻArabīyah al-Saʻūdīyah, three volumes, 1978
- Arabic: بلاد الجوف او دومة الجندل : بحوث جغرافية، تاريخية، اجتماعية، ادبية,
- Arabic: أصول التربية الإسلامية، مقارنة مع نظريات التربية, romanized: Uṣūl al-tarbīyah al-Islāmīyah., 1981
- Arabic: بين الغزل والهزل, romanized: Bayna al-ghazal wa-al-hazal : Majmūʻah min al-shiʻr al-shaʻbī, 1980
- Arabic: من أعلام الأدب الشعببي, romanized: Min aʻlām al-adab al-shaʻbī, 1980
- Arabic: موسوعة التراث للمملكة العربية السعودية, 1978
- Arabic: معجم التراث السلاح, romanized: Muʻjam al-turāth al-silāḥ, 1978
- Arabic: معجم التراث, romanized: Muʻjam al-turāth, 1998
- Arabic: معجم الأمكنة الوارد ذكرها في صحيح البخاري, romanized: Muʻjam al-amkinah al-wārid dhikruhā fī Ṣaḥīḥ al-Bukhārī, 1999
- Arabic: معجم الأماكن الواردة في المعلقات العشر, romanized: Muʻjam al-amākin al-wāridah fī al-Muʻallaqāt al-ʻashr, 2004
- Arabic: خواطر ونوادر تراثية: نصوص تاريخية وجعرافية واجتماعية, romanized: Khawāṭir wa-nawādir turāthīyah : nuṣūṣ tarīkhīyah wa-jughrāfīyah wa-ijtimāʻīyah
- Arabic: معجم الأمكنة الوارد ذكرها في القرآن الكريم, romanized: Muʻjam al-amkinah al-wārid dhikrihā fī al-Qurʼān al-karīm, 2003
- Arabic: بلاد العرب في المعاجم القديمة وبحوث المتأخرين (نقد وتقييم), romanized: Bilād al-ʻArab fī al-maʻājim al-qadīmah wa-buḥūth al-mutaʼakhkhirīn (naqd wa-taqyīm), 2003
- Arabic: اللباس : لغة – ادب – تاريخ – نقد, romanized: al-Libās : lughah – adab – tārīkh – naqd, 2004
