= 2020 in Saudi Arabia =

- Decades: 2000s; 2010s; 2020s; 2030s
- See also: Other events of 2020; History of Saudi Arabia

The following lists events in the year 2020 in Saudi Arabia.

== Incumbents ==
- Monarch: Salman
- Crown Prince: Mohammad bin Salman

== Events ==
=== January ===
- January 1 – Yemeni rebels release some Saudi prisoners, as UN-led peace talks make progress.
- January 8 – Saudi Arabia begins efforts to rebuild power stations in Yemen.

=== March ===
- March 2 – The first case of COVID-19 is confirmed in Qatif, marking the beginning of the pandemic in the country.

=== April ===
- April 24 – Saudi Arabia banned flogging as a judicial punishment.
- April 26 – Awwad Alawwad announced that, by royal decree, Saudi Arabia would no longer execute individuals for crimes committed while minors, replacing execution with a sentence of 10 years in a juvenile detention facility.

=== November ===
- November 11 – The Non–Muslim Cemetery in the Al-Balad district of Jeddah was attacked using an Improvised explosive device that injured several people. The attack took place during the annual Armistice Day commemorations to mark the cessation of hostilities in World War I.

== See also ==
- Saudi Arabia
- History of Saudi Arabia
- Outline of Saudi Arabia

=== Specific issues ===
- Saudi Arabian involvement in the Syrian Civil War
- COVID-19 pandemic in Saudi Arabia
