= 2014 Medina hotel fire =

Deadly fire in Medina, Saudi Arabia

- Location of Al Madinah Region in Saudi Arabia
- Date: February 8, 2014
- Location: Medina, Al Madinah Region, Saudi Arabia
- Cause: Electrical short circuit
- Deaths: 15
- Injuries: 130

The 2014 Medina hotel fire was a hotel fire that occurred in a hotel in Medina, Saudi Arabia. The fire killed at least 15 people and another 130 were injured.

== History ==
Around 700 pilgrims were staying at the hotel in Medina to perform the Umrah. An electrical short circuit caused a fire to break out in the hotel. According to a local government statement the fire was first reported at 6:30 pm ET, and the blaze was contained by 9 pm ET. Fifteen Egyptian pilgrims were killed and 130 other pilgrims were injured as a result of the fire. Preliminary indications suggested that those who were killed died of suffocation. The Egyptian consul general in the city of Jiddah, told reporters that most of the injured were Egyptians and that two children were among the dead. It took the rescue teams around two hours to put out the fire completely.
