= Rashid Al Shamrani =

Rashid Al Shamrani راشد الشمراني
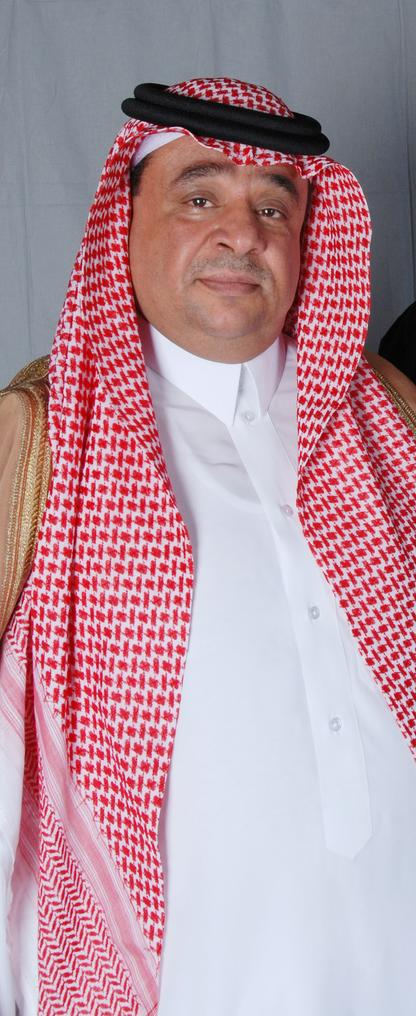
- Born: February 1, 1960 (age 66); Unaizah, Saudi Arabia
- Occupation: Actor
- Years active: 1977–present

Rashid Al Shamrani (Arabic: راشد الشمراني) is a Saudi Arabian television actor, clinical psychologist and dramatist Writer, known for his role in the Saudi series "Bayny wa bynak" (English: Between me and you) 1 and 2 and 3, Began his artistic career when he was student at the age 17.

== Acting Works ==
=== Plays ===
Tahat Al-Karsi (English: Under the chairs)

=== Series ===
- Tash ma Tash
- Awdat Asoid
- Bayny wa bynak (English: Between me and you) (for 3 seasons)
- Kalaf Al-Kalaf (English: Vice versa)
- Sali Al-Moder
- Katwat Ala Al-Jbal (English: Steps on the mountain)

=== Movies ===
- Sabah Al-Laial (English: Morning of the night).
- The Butterfly Effect: Azzam (2026)
