= History of Saudi Arabia =

The history of Saudi Arabia as a nation state began with the emergence of the Al Saud dynasty in central Arabia in 1727 and the subsequent establishment of the Emirate of Diriyah. Pre-Islamic Arabia, the territory that constitutes modern Saudi Arabia, was the site of several ancient cultures and civilizations; the prehistory of Saudi Arabia shows some of the earliest traces of human activity in the world.

Sections of Saudi Arabia and neighbouring countries formed a part of the Roman Empire.

The world's second-largest religion, Islam, emerged in what is now Saudi Arabia. In the early 7th century, the Islamic prophet Muhammad united the population of Arabia and created a single Islamic religious polity. Following his death in 632, his followers rapidly expanded the territory under Muslim rule beyond Arabia, conquering huge and unprecedented swathes of territory (from the Iberian Peninsula in the west to modern-day Pakistan in the east) in a matter of decades. Arab dynasties originating from modern-day Saudi Arabia founded the Rashidun (632–661), Umayyad (661–750), Abbasid (750–1517), and Fatimid (909–1171) caliphates, as well as numerous other dynasties in Asia, Africa, and Europe.

The area of modern-day Saudi Arabia formerly consisted of mainly four distinct historical regions: Hejaz, Najd and parts of Eastern Arabia (Al-Ahsa), and Southern Arabia ('Asir). The modern Kingdom of Saudi Arabia was founded in 1932 by Abdulaziz bin Abdul Rahman, also known as Ibn Saud in Western countries. Abdulaziz united the four regions into a single state through a series of conquests beginning in 1902 with the capture of Riyadh, the ancestral home of his family. Saudi Arabia has since been an absolute monarchy governed along Islamist lines. Saudi Arabia is sometimes called "the Land of the Two Holy Mosques", in reference to Al-Masjid al-Haram (in Mecca) and Al-Masjid an-Nabawi (in Medina), the two holiest places in Islam.

Petroleum was discovered on 3 March 1938 and followed up by several other finds in the Eastern Province. Saudi Arabia has since become the world's second largest oil producer (behind the US) and the world's largest oil exporter, controlling the world's second largest oil reserves and the sixth largest gas reserves.

From 1902 until his death in 1953, Saudi Arabia's founding father, Abdulaziz, ruled the Emirate of Riyadh (1902–1913), the Emirate of Nejd and Hasa (1913–1921), the Sultanate of Nejd (1921–1926), the Kingdom of Hejaz and Nejd (1926–1932), and as the King of Saudi Arabia (1932–1953). Thereafter, six of his sons in succession have reigned over the kingdom:

1. Saud, the immediate successor of Abdulaziz, faced opposition from most in the royal family and was eventually deposed.
2. Faisal replaced Saud in 1964. Until his murder by a nephew in 1975, Faisal presided over a period of growth and modernization fuelled by oil wealth. Saudi Arabia's role in the 1973 oil crisis, and the subsequent rise in the price of oil, dramatically increased the country's political significance and wealth.
3. Khalid, Faisal's successor, reigned during the first major signs of dissent: Islamist extremists temporarily seized control of the Grand Mosque in Mecca in 1979.
4. Fahd became king in 1982. During his reign, Saudi Arabia became the largest oil producer in the world. However, internal tensions increased when the country allied itself with the United States, and others, in the 1991 Gulf War. In the early 2000s, the Islamist opposition to the regime carried out a series of terrorist attacks.
5. Abdullah succeeded Fahd in 2005. He instituted a number of mild reforms to modernize many of the country's institutions and, to some extent, increased political participation.
6. Salman became king in 2015, at the age of 79. He oversaw the reorganization of the Saudi government and bestowed most of the king's political power into the crown prince, whom he replaced twice.

Salman's son and current crown prince, Mohammed bin Salman, effectively controls the government. Mohammed has been responsible for the controversial Saudi intervention in the Yemeni Civil War. He has overseen a number of legal and social reforms in the country, while also seeking to diversify the economy with Saudi Vision 2030.

== Prehistoric Arabia ==
There is evidence that human habitation in the Arabian Peninsula dates back to about 63,000 years ago. Nevertheless, stone tools from the Middle Paleolithic age, along with fossils of other animals discovered at Ti's al Ghadah, in northwestern Saudi Arabia, might imply that hominids migrated through a "Green Arabia" between 300,000 and 500,000 years ago.

Archaeology has revealed some early settled civilizations: the Dilmun civilization on the east of the Arabian Peninsula, the Thamūd north of the Hejaz, the Kingdom of Kinda in the centre, and the Al-Magar civilization in the southwest of the Arabian Peninsula. The earliest known events in Arabian history are migrations from the peninsula into neighbouring areas.

There is also evidence from Timna (Israel) and Tell el-Kheleifeh (Jordan) that the local Qurayya/Midianite pottery originated within the Hejaz region of northwestern Saudi Arabia, which suggests that the biblical Midianites originally came from the Hejaz region of the peninsula, before expanding into Jordan and southern Israel.

On 9 June 2020, the discovery of a 35-metre-long triangular megalithic monument in Dumat al-Jandal, dated back to the seventh millennium BC, presumably dedicated to ritual practices, was published in the journal Antiquity. Archaeological researchers from France, Saudi Arabia, and Italy, headed by Olivia Munoz, believe that these findings illuminate a pastoralist nomadic lifestyle and a ritual used in prehistoric Arabia.

In May 2021, archaeologists announced that a 350,000-year-old Acheulean site named An Nasim in the Hail region could be the oldest human habitation site in northern Saudi Arabia. The site was first discovered in 2015 using remote sensing and palaeohydrological modelling. It contains paleolake deposits related to Middle Pleistocene materials. 354 artefacts discovered by researchers, including hand axes, stone tools, and flakes, provide information about tool-making traditions of the earliest living humans inhabiting southwestern Asia. Besides, Paleolithic artefacts are similar to material remains uncovered at the Acheulean sites in the Nefud Desert.

== Antiquity and pre-Islamic period ==
=== Pre-Islamic polities in northern and central Arabia ===
Archaeological and literary evidence indicates that the Arabian Peninsula was home to a variety of cultures and polities long before the rise of Islam. Ancient Greek and Roman geographers divided the region into three zones: Arabia Petraea (northwest, linked to the Nabataeans and later annexed by Rome), Arabia Deserta (the central desert, dominated by nomadic tribes), and Arabia Felix (the fertile and wealthy south, identified with Yemen).

Within the territory of present-day Saudi Arabia, several important cultures developed. In the northwest, the kingdom of Lihyan (centered at Dedan, modern al-'Ula) flourished between the 6th and 2nd centuries BCE, leaving numerous inscriptions and monumental tombs. The Nabataeans later expanded into the northwestern Hejaz, controlling caravan routes and the oasis of Hegra (Madā'in Ṣāliḥ) until the Roman annexation of their kingdom in 106 CE. Tribes identified with the Thamūd are attested in Assyrian records and by thousands of inscriptions across northern Arabia.

In central Arabia, the Kindite dynasty emerged in the 5th century CE, attempting to establish a confederation of tribes from their capital at Qaryat al-Fāw, before their decline in the 6th century.

Although the great incense kingdoms of Saba', Qataban, Hadhramaut, and Himyar were located further south in modern Yemen, their prosperity through long-distance trade in frankincense and myrrh influenced northern Arabia through caravan routes crossing the Hejaz.

=== Religion in pre-Islamic northern and central Arabia ===
The religious landscape of the Arabian Peninsula before the advent of Islam was diverse. Most tribes in central and western Arabia practiced forms of polytheism. Deities such as Hubal, al-'Uzzā, al-Lāt, and Manāt were venerated, often represented by sacred stones (baetyls). The Kaaba in Mecca already served as a sanctuary housing multiple tribal cults and functioned as a pilgrimage center.

Jewish communities were established in several oases of northwestern Arabia, including Yathrib (later Medina), Khaybar, and Tayma, where they engaged in agriculture and trade. These groups were linked to the wider Jewish presence in South Arabia, where the kingdom of Himyar officially adopted Judaism in the fourth century CE.

Christianity was present in several regions. The oasis of Najrān in the southwest became a major Christian center by the fourth century CE. Nestorian Christian influence extended into northern Arabia, while Byzantine connections fostered Monophysite communities and monastic settlements.

In eastern Arabia, under the control of the Sasanian Empire in the sixth century, Zoroastrian practices were introduced, although they never displaced local traditions.

== Spread of Islam ==
The tribes of Arabia at the time of the spread of Islam (expandable map)

Muhammad, the Prophet of Islam, was born in Mecca in about 570 and first began preaching in the city in 610, before migrating to Medina in 622. From there, he and his companions united the tribes of Arabia under the banner of Islam and created a single Arab Muslim religious polity in the Arabian Peninsula.

Following Muhammad's death in 632, Abu Bakr became leader of the Muslims as the first caliph. After putting down a rebellion by the Arab tribes (known as the Ridda wars, or "Wars of Apostasy"), Abu Bakr attacked the Byzantine Empire. On his death in 634, he was succeeded by Umar as caliph, followed by Uthman ibn al-Affan and Ali ibn Abi Talib.

The period of these first four caliphs is known as the Rashidun Caliphate (al-Khilāfah ar-Rāshidah). Under the Rashidun caliphs, and, from 661, their Umayyad successors, the Arabs rapidly expanded the territory under Muslim control outside of Arabia. In a matter of decades, Muslim armies decisively defeated the Byzantine army and destroyed the Persian Empire, conquering huge swathes of territory from the Iberian Peninsula to India. The political focus of the Muslim world then shifted to the newly conquered territories.

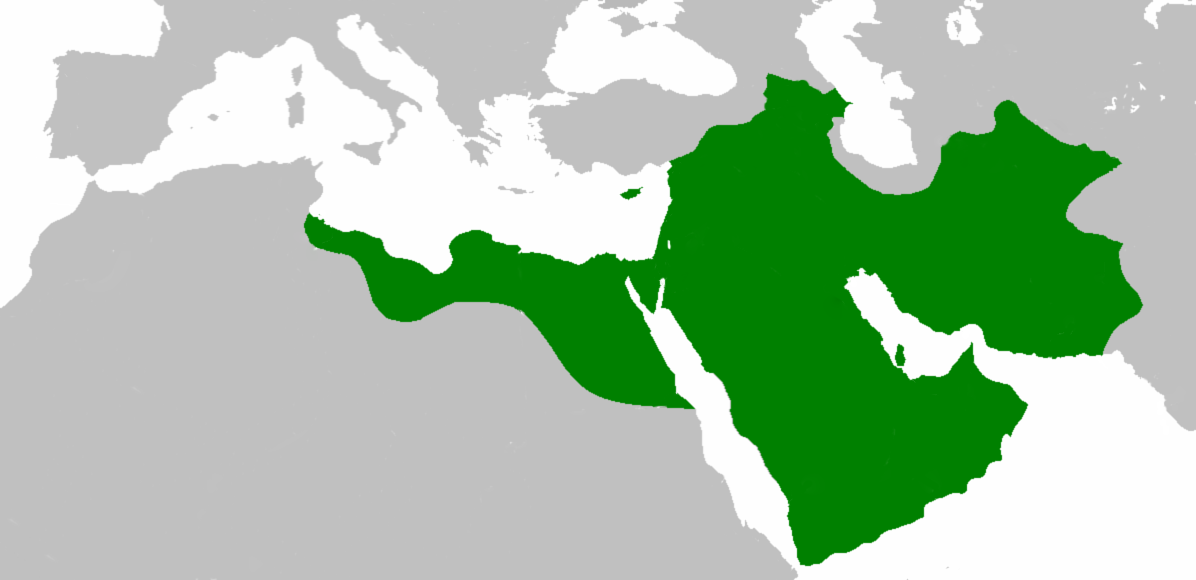
The Rashidun Caliphate reached its greatest extent under Caliph Uthman, c. 654

Nevertheless, Mecca and Medina remained the spiritually most important places in the Muslim world. The Quran requires every able-bodied Muslim who can afford it, as one of the five pillars of Islam, to make a pilgrimage, or Hajj, to Mecca during the Islamic month of Dhu al-Hijjah, at least once in his or her lifetime. The Masjid al-Haram (the Grand Mosque) in Mecca is the location of the Kaaba, Islam's holiest site, and the Masjid al-Nabawi (the Prophet's Mosque) in Medina is the location of Muhammad's tomb; as a result, from the 7th century, Mecca and Medina became pilgrimage destinations for large numbers of Muslims from across the Muslim world.

== Umayyad and Abbasid periods ==
After the fall of the Umayyad empire in 750 CE, most of what was to become Saudi Arabia reverted to traditional tribal rule soon after the initial Muslim conquests, and remained a shifting patchwork of tribes and tribal emirates and confederations of varying durability.

Muawiyah I, the first Umayyad caliph, took an interest in his native Mecca, erecting buildings and digging wells. Under his Marwanid successors, Mecca became the abode of poets and musicians. Even then, Medina eclipsed Mecca in importance for much of the Umayyad period, as it was home to the new Muslim aristocracy. Under Yazid I, the revolt of Abd Allah bin al-Zubair brought Syrian troops to Mecca. An accident led to a fire that destroyed the Kaaba, which was later rebuilt by Ibn al-Zubair. In 747, a Kharidjit rebel from Yemen seized Mecca unopposed, but he was soon defeated by Marwan II. In 750, Mecca, along with the rest of the caliphate, passed to the Abbasids.

=== Sharifate of Mecca ===
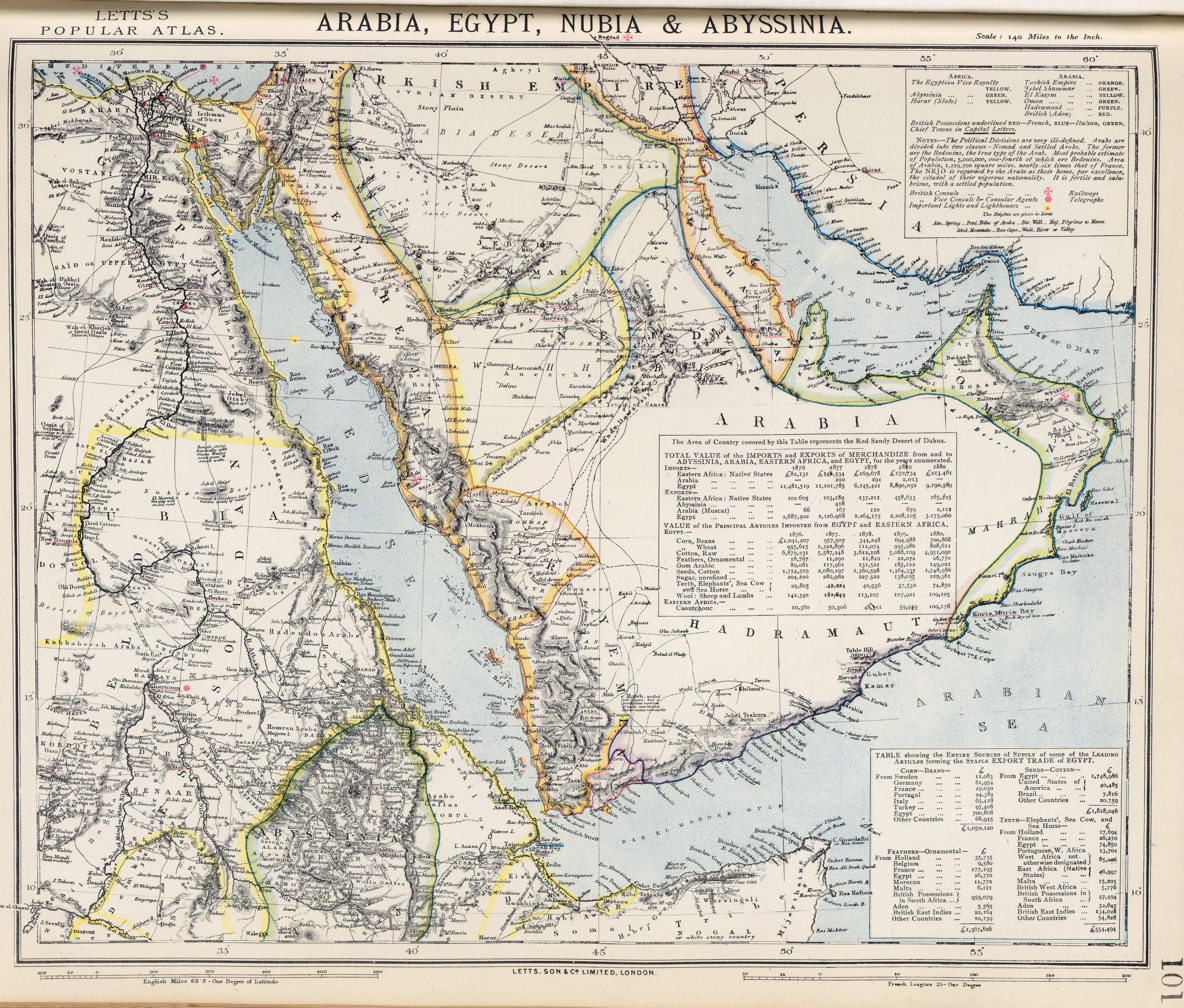
Atlas map of 1883

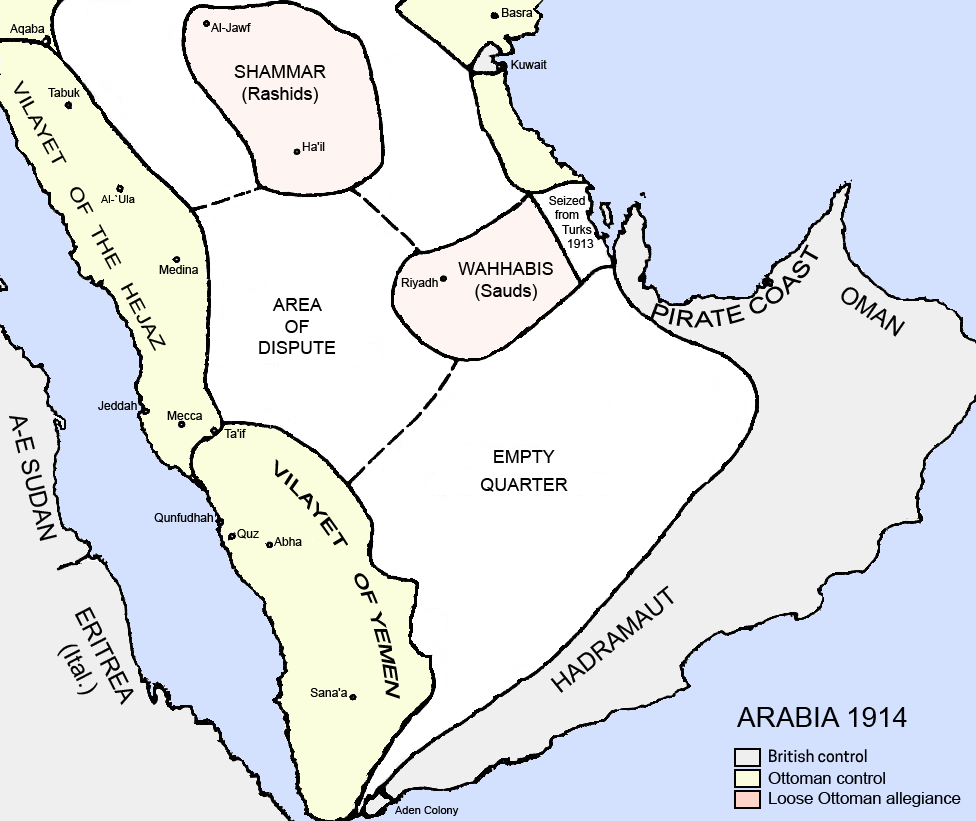
The Arabian Peninsula in 1914

From the 10th century (and, in fact, until the 20th century) the Hashemite Sharifs of Mecca maintained a state in the most developed part of the region, the Hejaz. Their domain originally comprised only the holy cities of Mecca and Medina but in the 13th century, it was extended to include the rest of the Hejaz. Although the Sharifs exercised at most times independent authority in the Hejaz, they were usually subject to the suzerainty of one of the major Islamic empires of the time. In the Middle Ages, these included the Abbasids of Baghdad, and the Fatimids, Ayyubids, and Mamluks of Egypt.

== Ottoman era ==
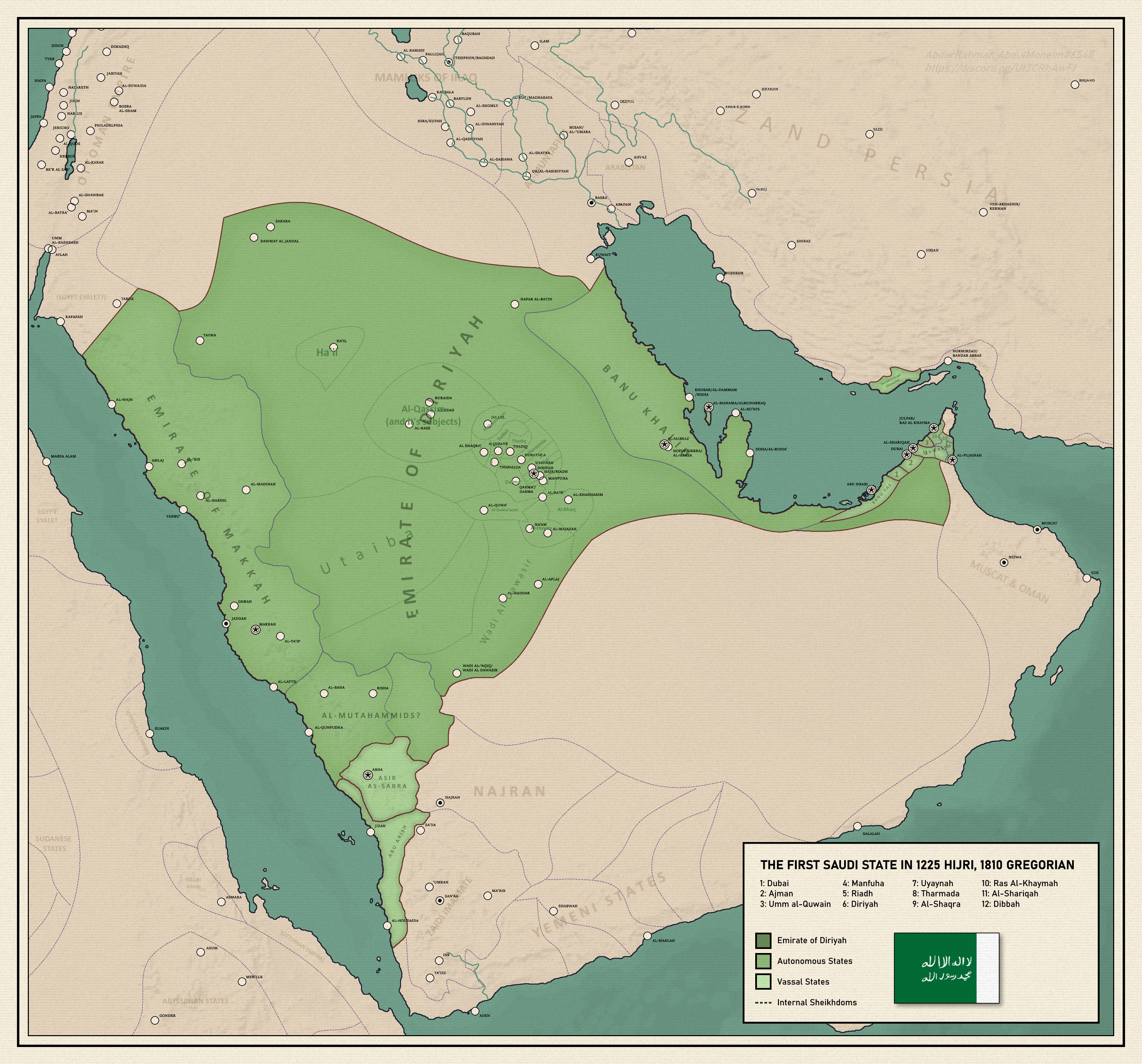
The first Saudi state 1727–1818

Beginning with Selim I's acquisition of Medina and Mecca in 1517, the Ottomans, in the 16th century, added to their empire the Hejaz and Asir regions along the Red Sea and the al-Hasa region on the Persian Gulf coast, these being the most populous parts of what was to become Saudi Arabia. They also laid claim to the interior, although this remained a rather nominal suzerainty. The degree of control over these lands varied over the next four centuries, with the fluctuating strength or weakness of the empire's central authority. In the Hejaz, the Sharifs of Mecca were largely left in control of their territory (although there would often be an Ottoman governor and garrison in Mecca). On the eastern side of the country, the Ottomans lost control of the al-Hasa region to Arab tribes in the 17th century but regained it again in the 19th century. Throughout the period, the interior remained under the rule of a large number of petty tribal rulers in much the same way as it had in previous centuries.

=== Rise of Wahhabism and the First Saudi State ===
Arabia in the 19th century

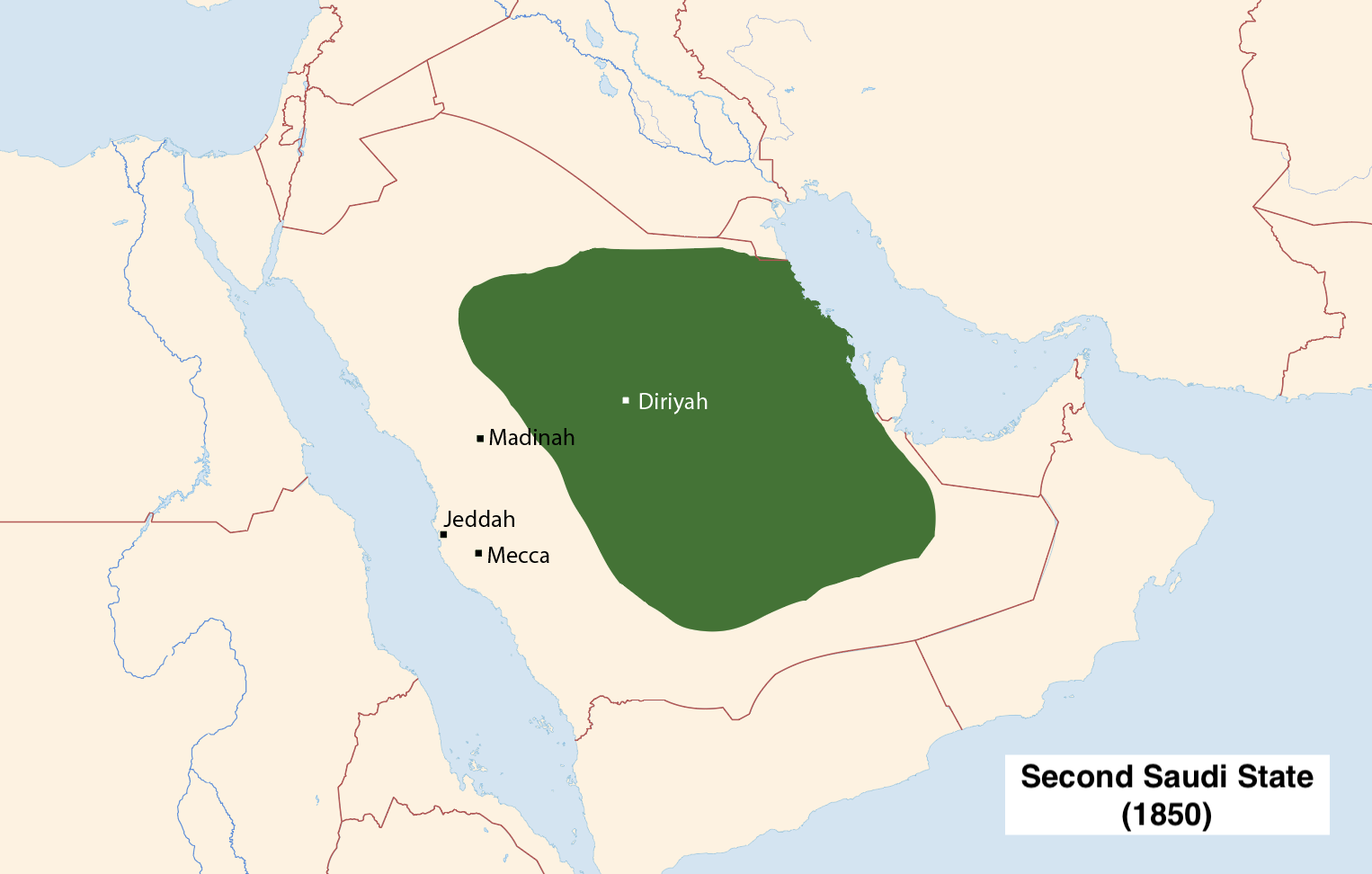
The second Saudi state 1824–1891, at its greatest extent.

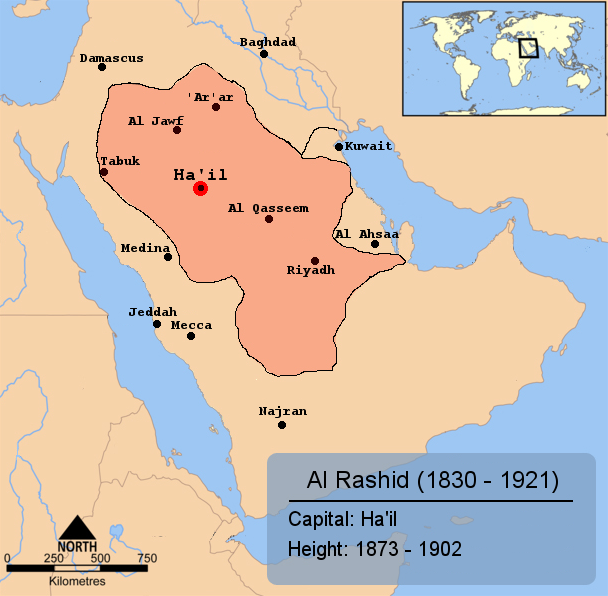
The Rashidi realm 1830–1921, at its greatest extent

The emergence of the Saudi dynasty began in central Arabia in 1727. In 1744, Muhammad ibn Saud, the tribal ruler of the town of Ad-Dir'iyyah near Riyadh, joined forces with the religious leader Muhammad ibn Abd-al-Wahhab, the founder of the Wahhabi movement. This alliance, formed in the 18th century, provided the ideological impetus to Saudi expansion and remains the basis of Saudi Arabian dynastic rule today. Over the next 150 years, the fortunes of the Saud family rose and fell several times as Saudi rulers contended with Egypt, the Ottoman Empire, and other Arabian families for control of the peninsula.

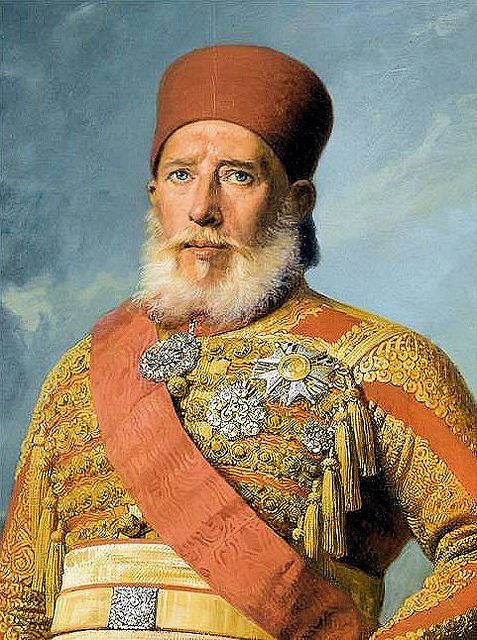
Ibrahim Pasha of Egypt (1789–1848)

The First Saudi State was established in 1727 in the area around Riyadh and briefly controlled most of the present-day territory of Saudi Arabia through conquests made between 1806 and 1815; these included Mecca (captured in 1806) and Medina (captured in April 1804). Concerned at the growing power of the Saudis, the Ottoman Sultan Mustafa IV instructed his viceroy in Egypt, Mohammed Ali Pasha, to reconquer the area. Ali sent his sons Tusun Pasha and Ibrahim Pasha, who were eventually successful in routing the Saudi forces in 1818, and destroyed the power of the Al Saud.

=== Return to Ottoman domination ===
The Al Saud returned to power in 1824, but their area of control was mainly restricted to the Saudi heartland of the Najd region, known as the Second Saudi State. However, their rule in Najd was soon contested by new rivals, the Rashidis of Ha'il. Throughout the rest of the 19th century, the Al Saud and the Al Rashid fought for control of the interior of what was to become Saudi Arabia. By 1891, the Al Saud were conclusively defeated by the Al Rashid, who drove the Saudis into exile in Kuwait.

Meanwhile, in the Hejaz, following the defeat of the First Saudi State, the Egyptians continued to occupy the area until 1840. After they left, the Sharifs of Mecca reasserted their authority, albeit with the presence of an Ottoman governor and garrison.

==== Arab Revolt ====
By the early 20th century, the Ottoman Empire continued to control or have suzerainty (albeit nominal) over most of the peninsula. Subject to this suzerainty, Arabia was ruled by a patchwork of tribal rulers (including the Al Saud who had returned from exile in 1902—see below) with the Sharif of Mecca having preeminence and ruling the Hejaz.

In 1916, with the encouragement and support of Britain and France (which were fighting the Ottomans in the First World War), the sharif of Mecca, Hussein bin Ali, led a pan-Arab revolt against the Ottoman Empire, with the aim of securing Arab independence and creating a single unified Arab state spanning the Arab territories from Aleppo in Syria to Aden in Yemen.

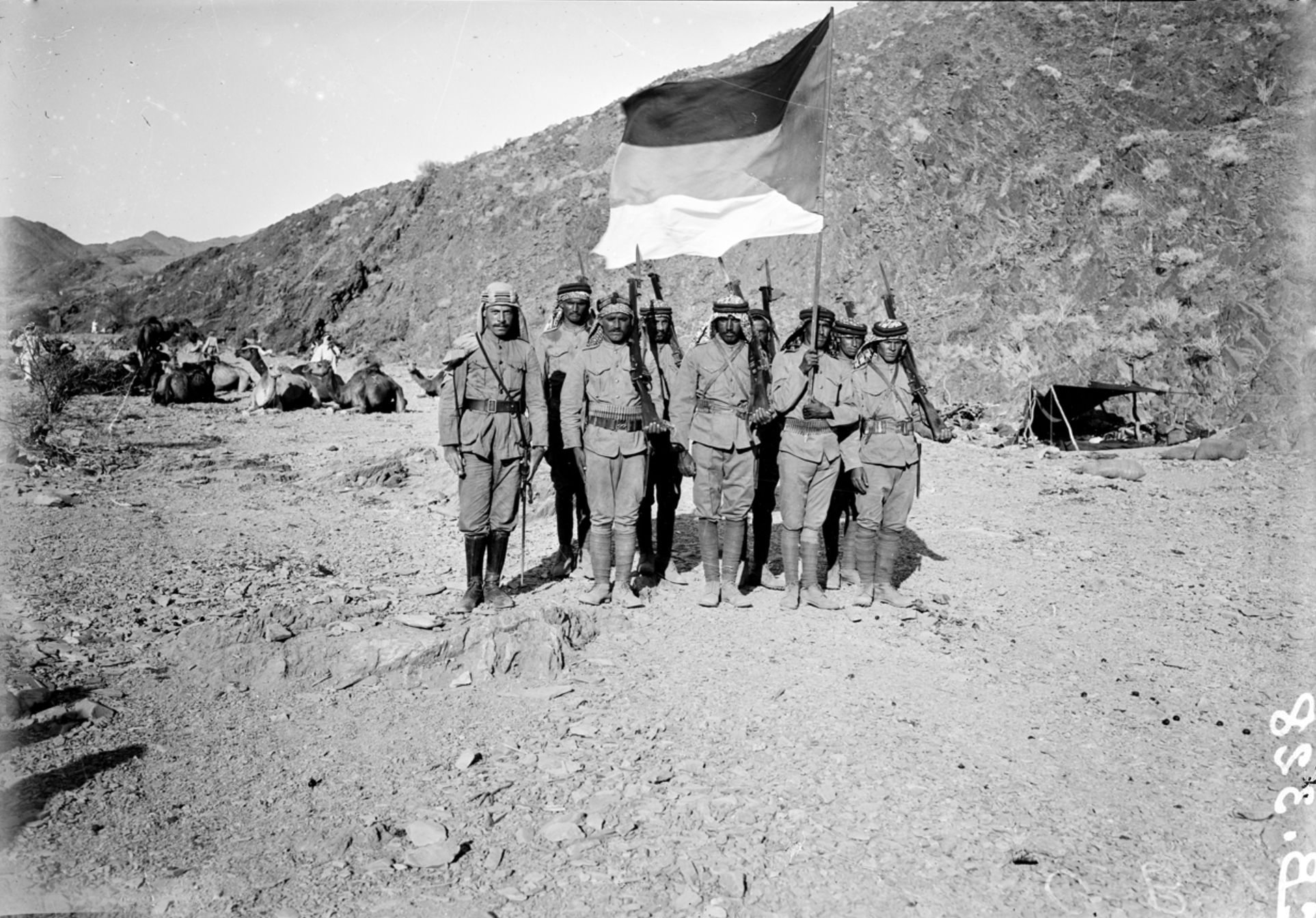
Soldiers in the Arab Army during the Arab Revolt of 1916–1918, carrying the Flag of the Arab Revolt and pictured in the Arabian Desert.

The Arab army comprised bedouin and others from across the peninsula, but not the Al Saud and their allied tribes, who did not participate in the revolt partly because of a long-standing rivalry with the Sharifs of Mecca and partly because their priority was to defeat the Al Rashid for control of the interior. Nevertheless, the revolt played a part in the Middle-Eastern Front and tied down thousands of Ottoman troops, thereby contributing to the Ottomans' World War I defeat in 1918.

However, with the subsequent partitioning of the Ottoman Empire, the British and French reneged on promises to Hussein to support a pan-Arab state. Although Hussein was acknowledged as King of the Hejaz, Britain later shifted support to the Al Saud, leaving him diplomatically and militarily isolated. The revolt, therefore, failed in its objective to create a pan-Arab state, but Arabia was freed from Ottoman suzerainty and control.

== Unification ==
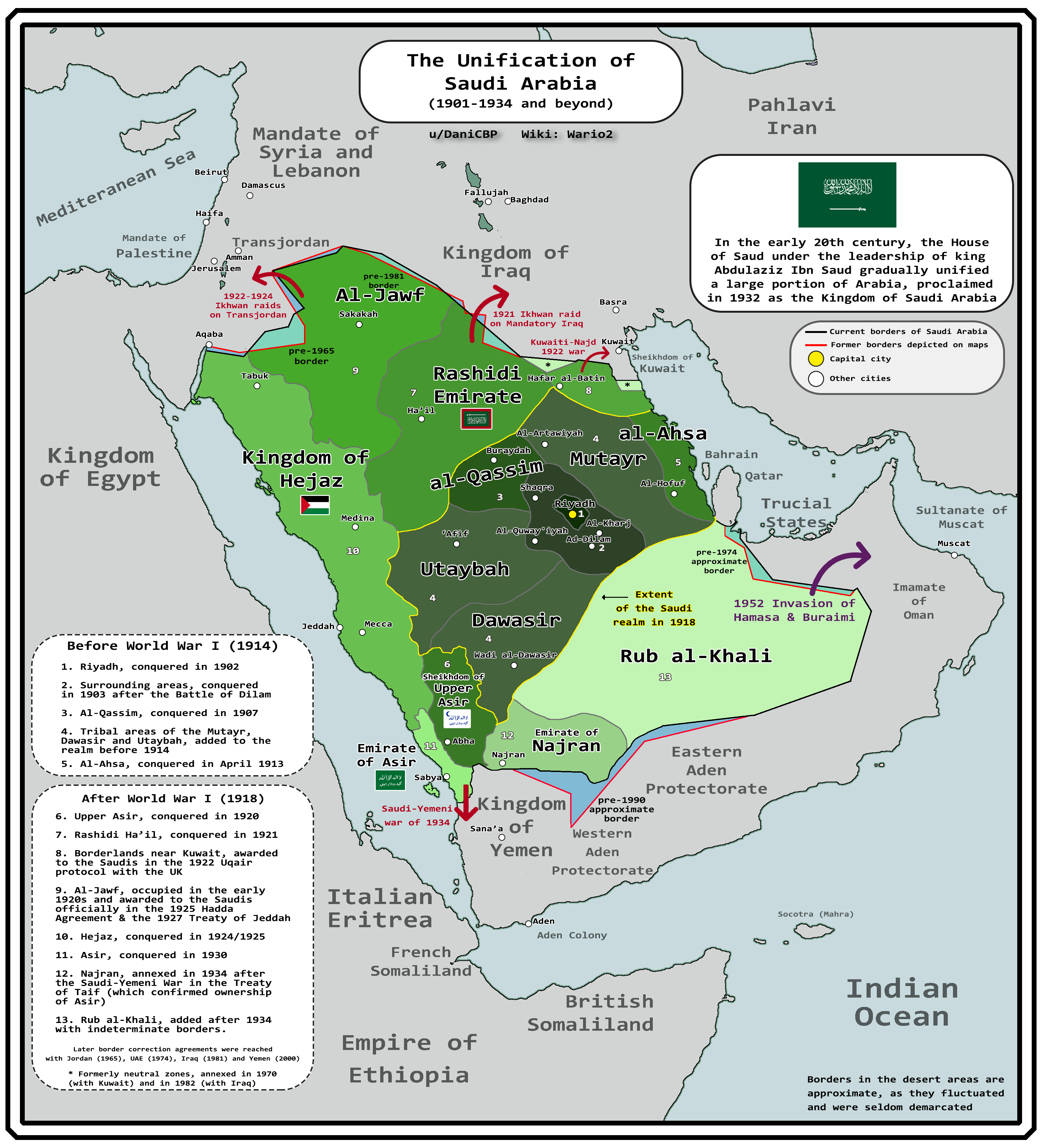
Territorial evolution of the Third Saudi State (1902–1934)

In 1902, Abdul-Aziz Al Saud, leader of the Al Saud, returned from exile in Kuwait to resume the conflict with the Al Rashid, and seized Riyadh—the first of a series of conquests creating the Third Saudi State, and ultimately leading to the creation of the modern state of Saudi Arabia in 1930. The main weapon for achieving these conquests was the Ikhwan, the Wahhabist-Bedouin tribal army led by Sultan bin Bajad Al-Otaibi and Faisal al-Duwaish.

By 1906, Abdulaziz had driven the Al Rashid out of Najd, and the Ottomans recognized him as their client in Najd. His next major acquisition was Al-Hasa, which he took from the Ottomans in 1913, bringing him control of the Persian Gulf coast and what would become Saudi Arabia's vast oil reserves. He avoided involvement in the Arab Revolt, having acknowledged Ottoman suzerainty in 1914, and instead continued his struggle with the Al Rashid in northern Arabia. In 1920, the Ikhwan's attention turned to the southwest, when they seized Asir, the region between the Hejaz and Yemen. In the following year, Abdul-Aziz finally defeated the Al Rashid and annexed all of northern Arabia.

Prior to 1923, Abdulaziz had not risked invading the Hejaz because Hussein bin Ali, King of the Hejaz, was supported by Britain. However, in that year, the British withdrew their support. At a conference in Riyadh in July 1924, complaints were stated against the Hejaz: principally, that pilgrimage from Najd was prevented. The Hejaz boycotted the implementation of certain public policy in contravention of shari'a. Ikhwan units were massed on a large scale for the first time, and under Khalid bin Lu'ayy and Sultan bin Bajad, rapidly advanced on Mecca, laying waste symbols of "heathen" practices. The Ikhwan completed their conquest of the Hejaz by the end of 1925. On 10 January 1926, Abdulaziz declared himself King of the Hejaz and on 27 January 1927, he took the title King of Najd (his previous title was Sultan). The use of the Ikhwan to effect the conquest had important consequences for the Hejaz: the old cosmopolitan society was uprooted, and a version of Wahhabi culture was imposed as a new compulsory social order.

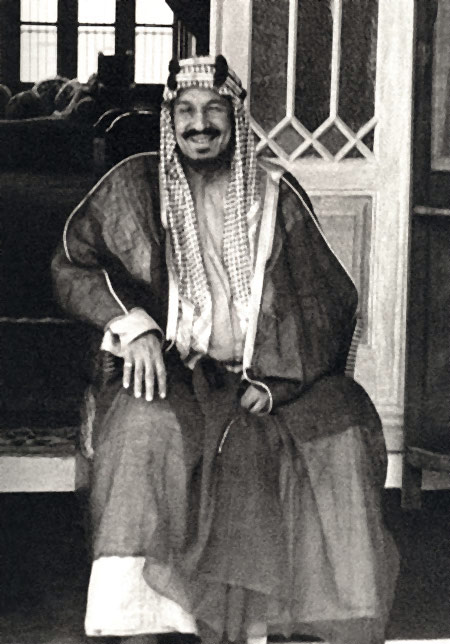
Abdulaziz Al Saud, founder of Saudi Arabia

By the Treaty of Jeddah, signed on 20 May 1927, the United Kingdom recognized the independence of Abdul-Aziz's realm (then known as the Kingdom of Hejaz and Najd). After the conquest of the Hejaz, Ikhwan leaders wanted to continue the expansion of the Wahhabist realm into the British protectorates of Transjordan, Mandatory Iraq, and Kuwait. Abdul-Aziz, however, refused to agree to this, recognizing the danger of a direct conflict with the British. The Ikhwan therefore revolted but were defeated in the Battle of Sabilla in 1929, and the Ikhwan leadership were massacred.

In 1932, the two kingdoms of the Hejaz and Najd were united as the "Kingdom of Saudi Arabia". Boundaries with Transjordan, Mandatory Iraq, and Kuwait were established by a series of treaties negotiated in the 1920s, with two "neutral zones" created, one with Iraq and the other with Kuwait. The country's southern boundary with Yemen was partially defined by the 1934 Treaty of Ta'if, which ended a brief border war between the two states.

== Modern history ==
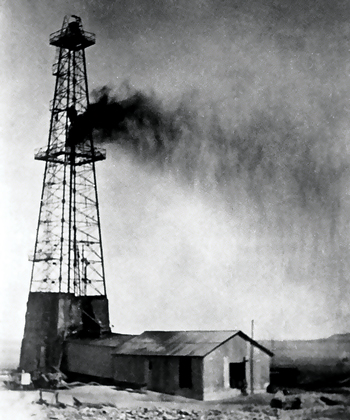
Dammam No. 7, the oil well where commercial volumes of oil were first discovered in Saudi Arabia on 4 March 1938.

Although Abdulaziz had military and political success, the country struggled economically until commercial volumes of oil were discovered in 1938 in the Al-Hasa region, along the Persian Gulf coast. Development began in 1946, after being delayed due to World War II. By 1949, oil production was in full swing.

In February 1945, Abdulaziz and U.S. President Franklin D. Roosevelt met aboard the USS Quincy in the Suez Canal. There they made a historic handshake agreement (still in effect today), whereby Saudi Arabia would supply oil to the United States in exchange for American military protection of the Saudi regime.

Abdulaziz died in 1953, upon which his son King Saud succeeded to the throne. Oil provided Saudi Arabia with economic prosperity and a great deal of political leverage in the international community. Meanwhile, the government became increasingly wasteful and lavish. Despite the new wealth, extravagant spending led to governmental deficits and foreign borrowing in the 1950s.

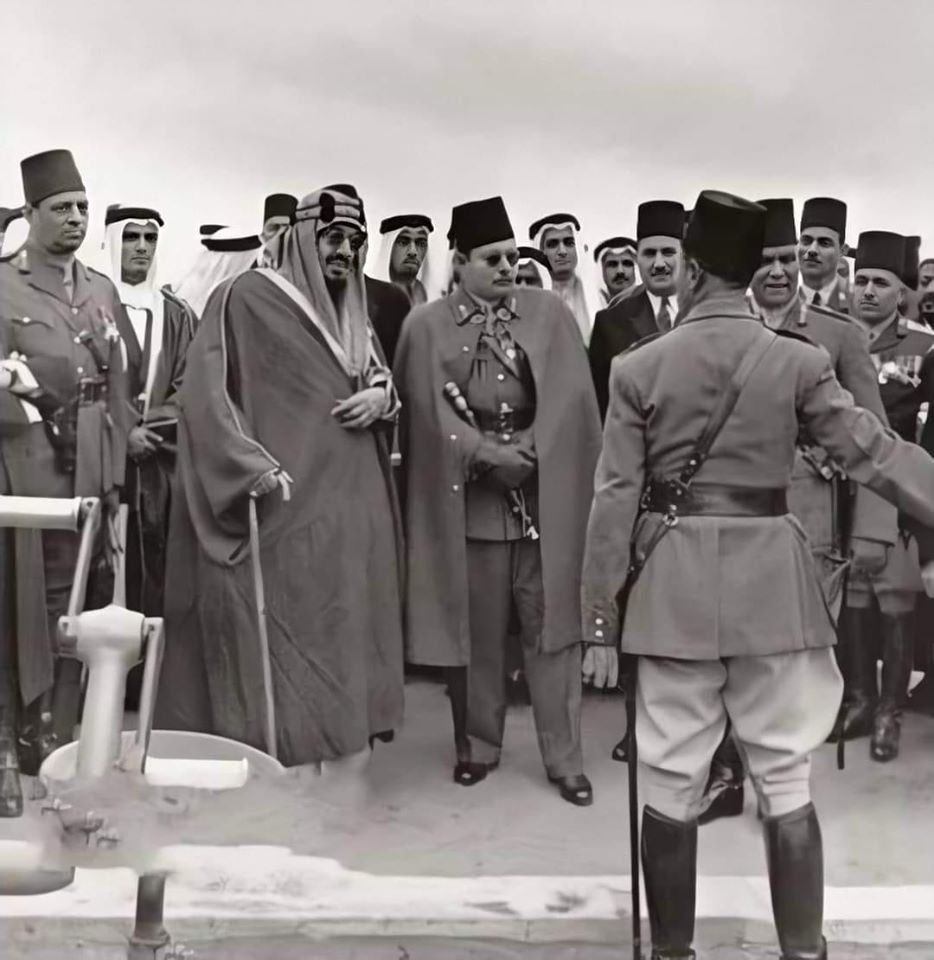
Abdulaziz (left) and Farouk checking an Egyptian Army unit in 1946. Other people picture include princes Fahd, Abdullah, and Mishaal, as well as prince Muhammad Abdel Moneim.

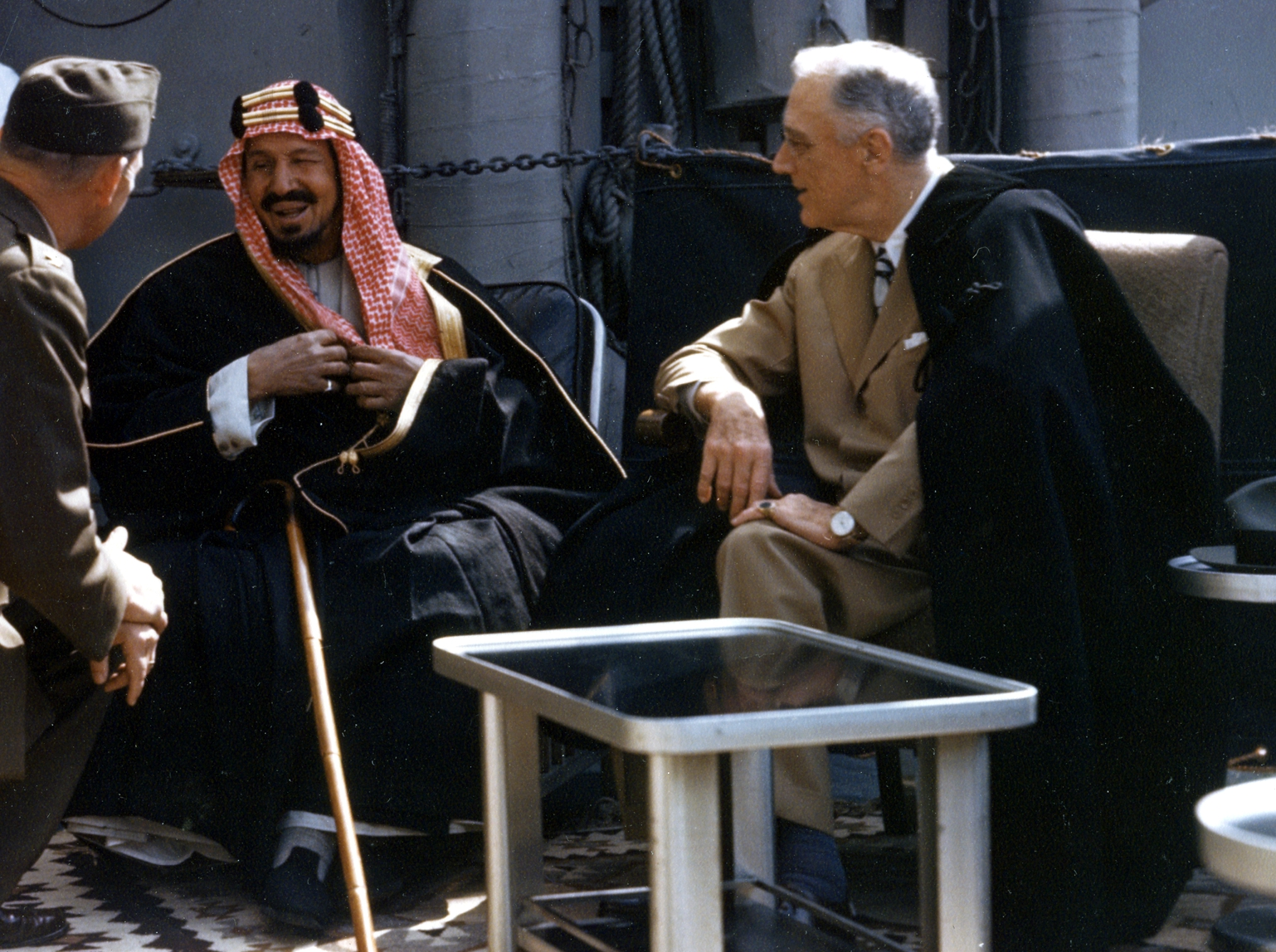
Abdulaziz (left) and Roosevelt aboard USS Quincy during their historic 1945 meeting

However, by the early 1960s, an intense rivalry between the King and his half-brother, Prince Faisal, emerged, fueled by doubts in the royal family over Saud's competence. As a consequence, Saud was deposed in favor of Faisal in 1964.

The mid-1960s saw external pressures generated by Saudi-Egyptian differences over Yemen. When civil war broke out in 1962 between Yemeni royalists and republicans, Egyptian forces entered Yemen to support the new republican government, while Saudi Arabia backed the royalists. It is estimated that between 1962 and 1970, the monarchy in Saudi Arabia faced one of the gravest threats to its survival from Yemen. Meanwhile, Ahmad Shukeiri was relieved from his post as representative of Saudi Arabia at the UN after praising the fascist far-right organization Tacuara, as this embarrassed Arabs and caused Latin American objections. Days before his dismissal, Hutchinson News reported that Arab diplomats, who claimed to be in close touch with the Saudi Arabian government, became so annoyed at Shukairy for his rash speech that they spoke of urging Saudi Prince Faisal to recall him. This case was not the first time they disapproved of his views and rhetoric.

Tensions with Yemen subsided only after 1967, when Egypt withdrew its troops from the country. Saudi forces did not participate in the Six-Day (Arab–Israeli) War of June 1967, but the government later provided annual subsidies to Egypt, Jordan, and Syria to support their economies.

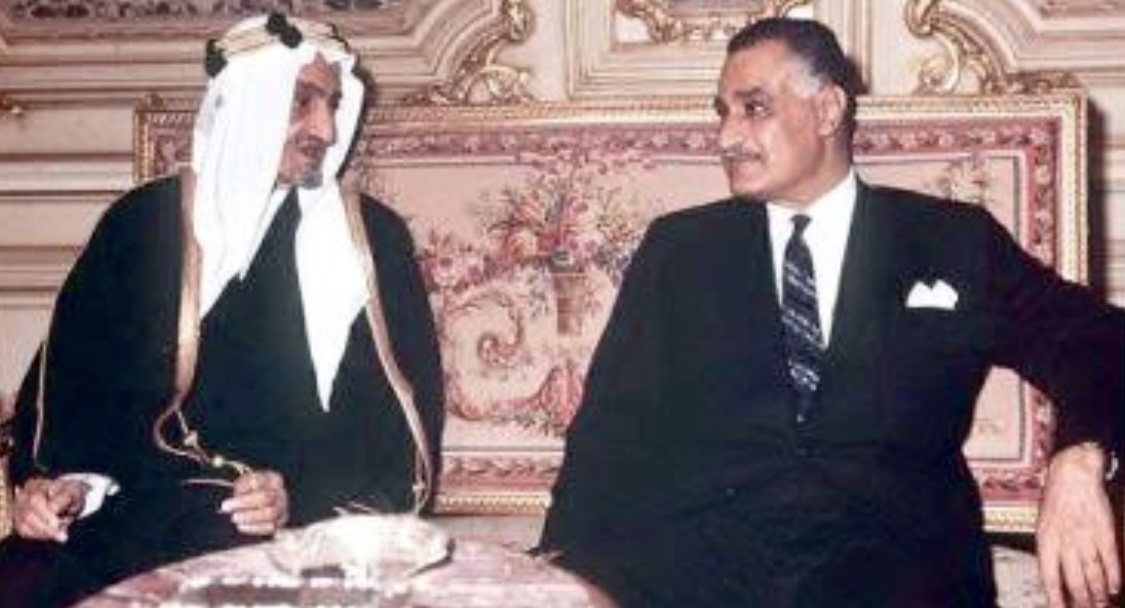
Faisal (left) and Nasser in Cairo, 1969

During the 1973 Arab-Israeli war, Saudi Arabia participated in the Arab oil boycott of the United States and other Western allies of Israel. A founding member of OPEC, Saudi Arabia voted in favor of the group's decision to moderate oil price increases beginning in 1971. After the 1973 war, the price of oil rose substantially, increasing Saudi Arabia's wealth and political influence.

Faisal was assassinated in 1975 by his nephew, Prince Faisal bin Musaid, and was succeeded by his half-brother King Khalid, during whose reign economic and social development continued at an extremely rapid rate, revolutionizing the infrastructure and educational system of the country; in foreign policy, close ties with the US resumed.

In 1979, two events occurred that the Al Saud perceived as threatening the regime, and had a long-term influence on Saudi foreign and domestic policy. The first was the Iranian Islamic revolution. There were several anti-government riots in the region in 1979 and 1980. The second event was the seizure of the Grand Mosque in Mecca by Islamist extremists. The militants involved were in part angered by what they considered to be the corruption and un-Islamic nature of the Saudi regime. Part of the response of the royal family was to enforce a much stricter observance of Islamic and traditional Saudi norms. Islamism continued to grow in strength.

King Khalid died in June 1982 and was succeeded by his brother King Fahd. Fahd maintained Saudi Arabia's foreign policy of close cooperation with the United States and increased purchases of sophisticated military equipment from the US and Britain.

Following the Iraqi invasion of Kuwait in 1990, Saudi Arabia joined the anti-Iraq coalition. King Fahd, fearing an attack from Iraq, invited soldiers from the US and 32 other countries to Saudi Arabia. Saudi and coalition forces also repelled Iraqi forces when they breached the Kuwaiti-Saudi border in 1991.

In 1995, Fahd suffered a debilitating stroke and his half-brother, Crown Prince Abdullah, assumed day-to-day responsibility for the government. In 2003, Saudi Arabia refused to support the US and its allies in the invasion of Iraq. Terrorist activity within Saudi Arabia increased dramatically in 2003, with the Riyadh compound bombings and other attacks, which prompted the government to take more stringent action against terrorism. Abdullah, already regent, officially ascended to the throne upon the death of Fahd in 2005. Despite growing calls for change, King Abdullah continued the policy of moderate reform. He pursued a policy of limited deregulation, privatization, and seeking foreign investment. In December 2005, following twelve years of talks, the World Trade Organization gave the green light to Saudi Arabia's membership.

As the Arab Spring unrest and protests began to spread across the Arab world in early 2011, King Abdullah announced an increase in welfare spending. No political reforms were announced as part of the package. At the same time, Saudi troops were sent to participate in the crackdown on unrest in Bahrain. King Abdullah gave asylum to deposed President Zine El Abidine Ben Ali of Tunisia and telephoned President Hosni Mubarak of Egypt (prior to his deposition) to offer support. Abdullah also granted women the right to vote in municipal elections.

King Abdullah died in 2015 and his half-brother Salman became king. The new king reorganized the government, abolishing several bureaucratic departments. King Salman involved Saudi Arabia in the Second Yemeni Civil War. Salman named his son Mohammed bin Salman as crown prince in 2017, and Mohammed has been assisting his father in the government ever since. Shortly after becoming crown prince, he detained 200 princes and businessmen in the Ritz-Carlton in Riyadh, stating that this was a move to prevent corruption in Saudi Arabia.

Mohammed bin Salman has led Saudi Vision 2030, a plan to diversify the country's economy and move Saudi Arabia away from a dependence on oil revenues. He has also weakened the powers of the Saudi religious police and granted a number of rights to women in the country. For instance, Saudi women were given the right to drive in 2017 and in 2018, they were allowed to open their own business without the permission of a male guardian and to maintain custody of their children following a divorce. But Mohammed has also gained criticism for, among other things, his involvement in the murder of journalist Jamal Khashoggi and human rights violations under his rule.

== See also ==
- History of the Middle East
- Kingdom of Kinda
- King of Saudi Arabia
- Timeline of Jeddah
- Timeline of Medina
- Timeline of Riyadh
