= Kurnatowski =

Polish noble family

- Łodzia Coat of Arms
- Current region: Poland, Lithuania
- Origin: Kurnatowice, Poland
- Members: Zygmunt Kurnatowski; Eryk Kurnatowski; Konstanty Kurnatowski
- Estate: Kurnatowski Palace

The Kurnatowski family (Polish plural: Kurnatowscy) is a Polish aristocratic family. The family has been highly prominent for centuries, first in the Kingdom of Poland, later in the Polish–Lithuanian Commonwealth, and presently in the Republic of Poland.

Since the 16th century, members of the Kurnatowski family have been active in politics, the arts, and military affairs. The family has maintained extensive wealth and land holdings, including palaces in Biezdrowo, Dusina, Gościeszyn, Kotowo, and Żołędowo.

The family was first described in 1336 by Nicolaus Starogrodzki in Kreis Birnbaum. In 1902, a line was given the title of Count by edict of Pope Leo XIII. In 1916, another line received the title of Count from Tsar Nicholas II.

== History ==
The Kurnatowski family was first described in 1336 by Nicolaus Starogrodzki in Międzychód. The name comes from the Kurnatowice, which was owned by the family since 1448. Originally the name was therefore Kurnatowski. During the 16th Century the family was consolidated under the name Kurnatowski.

The family is part of the Łodzia clan and have been participants in politics, arts, and military endeavors. As magnates and members of the nobility, the Kurnatowski family has maintained extensive land holdings, including palaces in Biezdrowo, Dusina, Gościeszyn, Kotowo, and Żołędowo.

The family's Golden Age was the 17th century, when its members accumulated much wealth and influence, held numerous important posts within the Polish–Lithuanian Commonwealth. The title of Count (Hrabia in Polish) was bestowed by Papal edict in 1902 to one of the branches of the family. Another line received the title of Count in 1916 from Tsar Nicholas II. Some members of the Kurnatowski family were ardent members of the Polish Reformed Church, or Calvinists, producing a number of clergymen, although the Duisina and other family lines have remained Roman Catholic since at least the 13th century. The Prussian line would go on to produce several Prussian major generals and a member of the German Reichstag.

== Coat of arms and motto ==
The Kurnatowski family uses the Łodzia arms and the motto, My pływamy w krwi naszych wrogów ("We swim in the blood of our enemies"). Having first appeared in 1303, the arms are one of the oldest in Poland.

== Notable members ==
- Hrabia Zygmunt Kurnatowski: 1778–1858, Count, Polish general, aide-de-camp to Napoleon Bonaparte, involved in the November Uprising and in the Polish-Russian War of 1831.
- Hrabia Eryk Kurnatowski: 1883–1975, Count (since 1916), Polish Senator, established Poland's premier horse-breeding facility on his estate at Łochów
- Konstanty Kurnatowski: 1878–1968, pastor in Kielmy, and later the General Superintendent (bishop) of the Lithuanian Brethren, and from 1938 till 1940 of the Polish Reformed Church.
- Hrabia Zygmunt Kurnatowski: born 1858, obtained the hereditary papal title of Count from Pope Leo XIII in 1902; see Counts of Galicia and Poland
- Maria Kurnatowska: 1945–2009, Polish politician who served as a Member of Sejm from 1993 to 1997 and as a Member of Kuyavian-Pomeranian Regional Assembly from 1999 to 2009.
- Andrzej Kurnatowski: 1927–2020, Polish physician.
- Helena Kurnatowska: 1929, Polish politician who served as a Member of Sejm from 1976 to 1985.
- Theo Von: 1980, American podcast host

== Bibliography ==
- Wolf-Dietrich v. Kurnatowski: Genealogie des Geschlechts Kurnatowski, Braunschweig 1964 (Manuscript)
- August Wilhelm Bernhard v. Uechtritz: Diplomatische Nachrichten adeliger Familien 7, Leipzig 1795.
