= Adamowo railway station =

Railway station in Adamowo, western Poland

Adamowo

General information
- Location: Adamowo, Greater Poland Voivodeship; Poland
- Coordinates: 52°06′13.56″N 16°09′17.45″E
- Owner: PKP Polskie Linie Kolejowe
- Line: Powodowo–Luboń
- Platforms: 1
- Tracks: 1
- Train operators: Greater Poland Railways

History
- Opened: 11 June 2023

Services
Preceding station	KW	Following station
Tłoki towards Poznań Główny	KW	Wolsztyn towards Powodowo
Location
- Location within Poland Location within Greater Poland Voivodeship

Adamowo is a railway station on the Powodowo–Luboń railway in the village of Adamowo, Wolsztyn County, within the Greater Poland Voivodeship in west-central Poland.

== History ==
The station opened on 11 June 2023 part of the modernisation of the Powodowo–Luboń railway.

== Train services ==
The station is served by the following services:

- Regional services (KW) Poznań Główny - Grodzisk Wielkopolski. - Wolsztyn - Powodowo
