= Józef Pluta =

Executed Polish serial killer and mass murderer

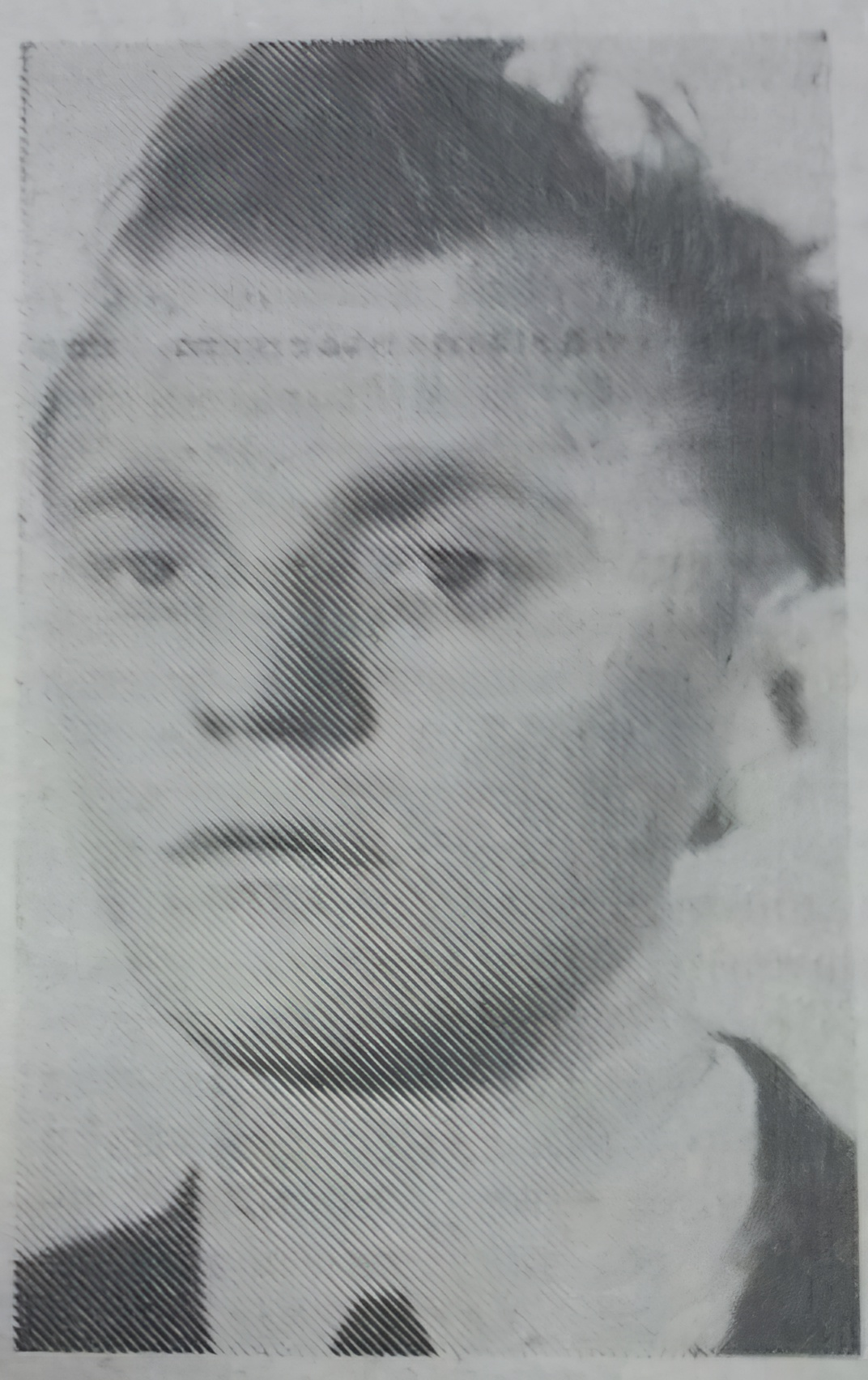
- Pluta in 1979
- Born: March 16, 1932; Marianowo, Greater Poland, Second Polish Republic
- Died: October 29, 1979 (aged 47); Karna, Greater Poland, Polish People's Republic
- Cause of death: Blunt force trauma from an attempt at suicide by hanging (disputed)
- Other name: "The Vampire of Marianowo"
- Conviction: Murder
- Penalty: 12 years

Details
- Victims: 7+
- Span of crimes: 1973–1979
- Country: Poland
- State: Greater Poland
- Date apprehended: Committed suicide to avoid apprehension

Józef Pluta (March 16, 1932 – October 29, 1979), known as The Vampire of Marianowo (Polish: Wampir z Marianowa), was a Polish serial killer and mass murderer who killed at least six people across Greater Poland during a two-month killing spree in 1979, committed shortly after escaping a mental institution where he was serving a 12-year sentence for murder. A large manhunt was initiated for his capture, resulting in his death under disputed circumstances.

== Early life and first murder ==
Little is known of Pluta's background. He was born on March 16, 1932, in the village of Marianowo, and by 1973, he was married and had a son. Sources differ on what occupation Pluta had at this time, with some claiming that he was a roofer while others say he was a farmer, but most concur that he was resented by other villagers due to his sexual proclivities.

On February 27, 1973, Pluta was allegedly caught having sex with a sheep inside a barn by a neighbor, Aniela B. Fearing that she would reveal his secret to the entire village, he grabbed a blunt instrument and hit her several times on the head, before proceeding to strangle her. Pluta then dragged the body to the nearby Warta river, where he threw it in to dispose of it. However, he did not cover his tracks well, as his shoes were bloodied and a big trail of blood was left behind, which allowed Aniela's husband to quickly locate her body. Not long after, local Milicja Obywatelska officers identified him as a suspect and arrested him. Pluta confessed to the murder during the interrogation, and after a short trial, he was found guilty and sentenced to 12 years imprisonment. Per the court's ruling, he was ordered to spend his sentence at a closed psychiatric institution in Obrzyce.

== Escape and further killings ==
During his stay in Obrzyce, Pluta was assigned to do various renovation and construction works in nearby villages and towns under supervision, which allowed him partial freedom. While he quickly gained the trust of the medical staff and the people whose properties he renovated, Pluta was reviled by fellow inmates due to his zoophiliac tendencies. Fearing the possibility that he would be killed by them, he eventually decided to escape.

On the night of September 9–10, 1979, Pluta escaped from the hospital and headed towards his native village. On the way, he passed through the village of Pąchy, where Teresa S. – an acquaintance he knew from the hospital – lived with her family. Pluta was invited inside and had dinner with the family, but later on in the night, he decided to kill them. He grabbed an axe and proceeded to hack to death Teresa and her husband, Jan, then raped and hacked to death their 13-year-old daughter, Zdzisława. From there, Pluta went to the family's barn, where he came across 80-year-old boarder Wojciech J., who had been staying with them at the time. Unwilling to leave any potential witnesses alive, he killed him as well.

After fleeing the crime scene, Pluta continued to wander until he found himself in Suchy Las, where a doctor from the hospital, Henryk K., lived. Since he had done renovations for him before and was treated almost like a family friend, he was allowed to stay overnight, but not long after, Pluta grabbed an axe and attacked them. During the attack, K.'s wife Krystyna was killed while the grandparents and son were injured, one of whom later died from their injuries in hospital. Henryk, who not at home at the time, later discovered the gruesome crime scene.

== Manhunt and death ==
By the time of the second massacre, Pluta was already identified as the prime suspect in the Pąchy murders and was sought as a fugitive by the Milicja. Due to his dangerous nature and apparent bloodlust, people across the region were panicked and afraid that he might attack them next, resulting in numerous erroneous sightings of the killer being reported to the authorities. Pluta's location was not conclusively established until October 29, when he was spotted near the village of Karna by three farmers. Upon confirming that it was him, a large group of officers were dispatched to the region to apprehend him.

Subsequently, what led to Pluta's death has been the subject of debate – according to the official version, he found himself cornered in a small yard, but before he could be arrested, he climbed a tree and attempted to hang himself with a belt, but the branch broke due to his weight and caused him to fall down. The resulting fall then caused a fracture so severe that his skull was crushed, killing him instantly. However, there have been speculations that he had been instead shot dead by Milicja operatives, who then staged a fake suicide. Another theory suggested that Pluta was solely responsible for one murder and that the other murders had been pinned on him by the Gorzów Wielkopolski Prosecutor's Office, but these claims have never been substantiated.

In 2021, a woman referred to as "Mrs. Barbara" wrote a letter to Gazeta Lubuska, claiming that she had been attacked by Pluta in April or May 1978. In her letter, "Mrs. Barbara" claimed that she had boarded a train bound for Krzyż, and while sleeping in one of the compartments, she was awakened by somebody making noises in the hallway. When she checked out what was going on, she was confronted by a sinister-looking man who intruded into her compartment, and after failing to convince him to go elsewhere, the man grabbed her bag. She managed to go past him and ran to the end of the compartment, where she came across several men playing cards. She then turned around to see if the man was still there, but he was nowhere to be seen. Mrs. Barbara claimed that she remembered his face well, and decades later, she decided to search for the word 'serial killer' to see what comes up - once she saw a picture of Pluta, she immediately recognized him as her assailant. If her account is to be believed, it is possible that Pluta may have had more victims than what is currently known, likely committed during his trips related to his renovation work.

== See also ==
- List of serial killers by country
