= Adamowo, Wolsztyn County =

Adamowo
- Village
- Location within Poland
- Coordinates: 52°6′15″N 16°8′33″E
- Country: Poland
- Voivodeship: Greater Poland
- County: Wolsztyn
- Gmina: Wolsztyn
- Population: 885

Adamowo [adaˈmɔvɔ] is a village in the administrative district of Gmina Wolsztyn, within Wolsztyn County, Greater Poland Voivodeship, in west-central Poland.

The village is served by Adamowo railway station.
