= Zygmunt Kurnatowski =

Polish count and nobleman

- Hrabia
- Coat of arms: Łodzia
- Born: 1778; Pożarów, Poland
- Died: 1858 (aged 79–80); Warsaw, Poland
- Noble family: Kurnatowski
- Consort: Anna Stamm

Zygmunt Aleksander Kurnatowski (1778–1858) was a Polish count and nobleman of the Łodzia coat of arms. From 1836 to 1841 he led the Kingdom of Poland as a member of the Council of State. He was a major general in the army of the Kingdom of Poland.

Kurnatowski was born into a segment of the Kurnatowski family that were devout members of the Polish Reformed Church. He was a participant of the Greater Poland Uprising of 1806, after which he joined the army of the Napoleonic Duchy of Warsaw. He participated in of all of its major campaigns. In 1810 he reached the rank of the colonel. Was made General from 1814 and commander of a cavalry brigade. He fought to the end of the existence of the Napoleonic Army, then returned to Poland and joined the army of the Kingdom of Poland.

From 1823 he was made commander of a brigade in the Reserve Corps. From 1828 aide-de-camp of the tsar of Russia Nicholas I of Russia, reaching the rank of a major general. He obeyed the orders of each authority even despite his own convictions. As the member of a Military Court, he opted for the condemnation of Walerian Łukasiński.

On the night of the start of November Uprising of 1830 he opposed the insurgents and resigned from active duty.

On the defeat of the rebellion he briefly re-entered Russian service, but in 1832 he was dismissed by the tsar. Buried in the Calvinist burial ground in Orzeszkowo near Poznań. He was awarded the Order of Saint Stanislaus by Alexander I of Russia.
