= Kębłowo =

Kębłowo may refer to the following places:

- Kębłowo, Wolsztyn County in Greater Poland Voivodeship (west-central Poland)
- Kębłowo, Września County in Greater Poland Voivodeship (west-central Poland)
- Kębłowo, Pomeranian Voivodeship (north Poland)
