= Belęcin =

- Village
- Location within Poland
- Coordinates: 52°12′N 16°0′E
- Country: Poland
- Voivodeship: Greater Poland
- County: Wolsztyn
- Gmina: Siedlec

Belęcin [bɛˈlɛnt͡ɕin] is a village in the administrative district of Gmina Siedlec, within Wolsztyn County, Greater Poland Voivodeship, in west-central Poland.
