= Kopanica, Greater Poland Voivodeship =

Kopanica
- Village
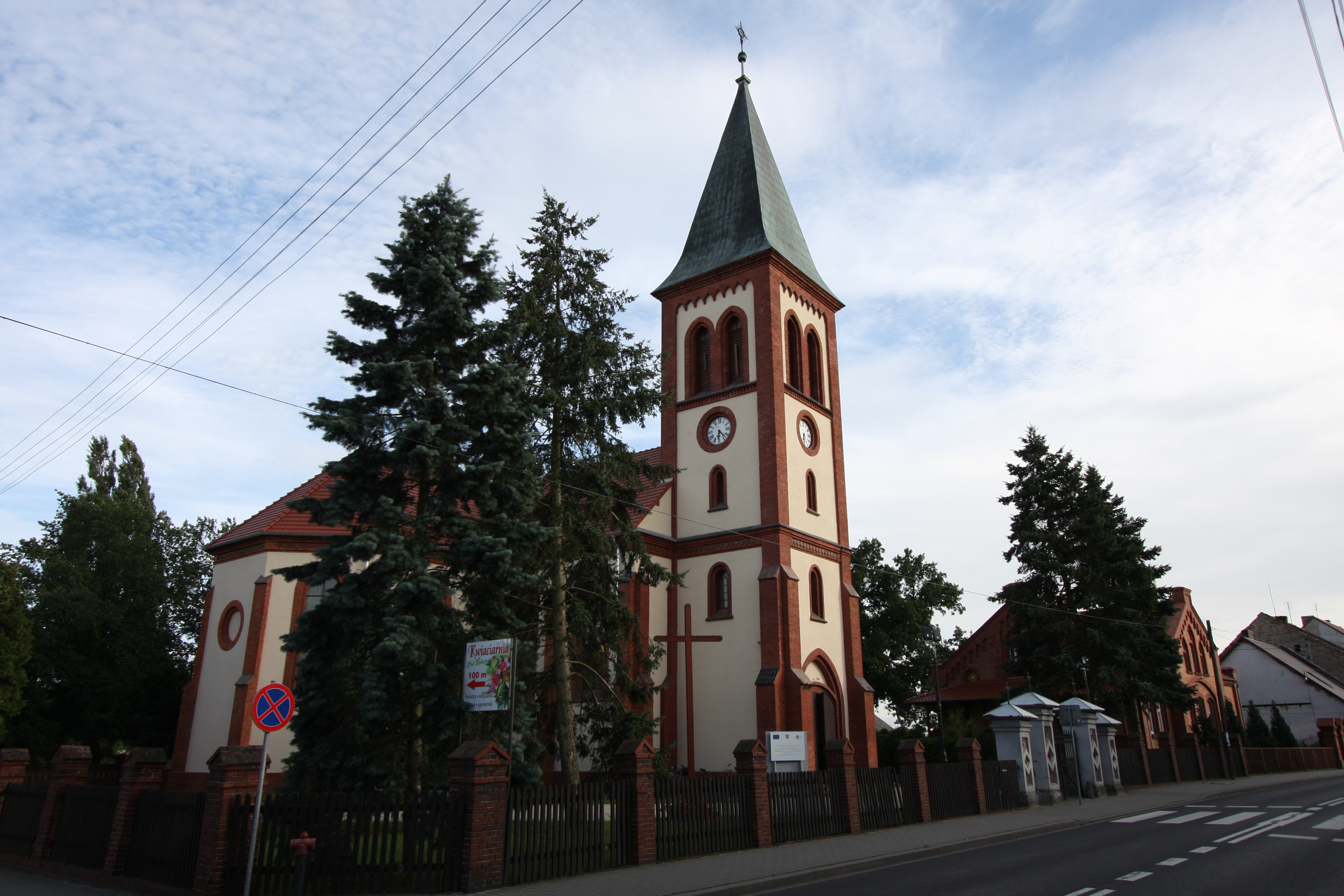
- Church of the Assumption in Kopanica

- Location within Poland
- Coordinates: 52°05′43″N 15°55′18″E
- Country: Poland
- Voivodeship: Greater Poland
- County: Wolsztyn
- Gmina: Siedlec

Population
  - Total: 890
- Time zone: UTC+1 (CET)
  - Summer (DST): UTC+2 (CEST)
- Vehicle registration: PWL

Kopanica [kɔpaˈnit͡sa] is a village in the administrative district of Gmina Siedlec, within Wolsztyn County, Greater Poland Voivodeship, in western Poland.

== History ==
Kopanica is part of the region of Greater Poland, considered the cradle of the Polish state. In early Poland, there was a Polish defensive stronghold in Kopanica, one of the strongholds that reinforced the defense of the western border in the event of a possible German invasion from the west, located east of the defensive strongholds in the Lubusz Land. Kopanica was a royal town of the Kingdom of Poland, administratively located in the Kościan County in the Poznań Voivodeship in the Greater Poland Province of the Kingdom of Poland.
