= Wroniawy, Greater Poland Voivodeship =

Wroniawy
- Village
- Location within Poland
- Coordinates: 52°3′N 16°8′E
- Country: Poland
- Voivodeship: Greater Poland
- County: Wolsztyn
- Gmina: Wolsztyn
- Population: 1,307
- Website: http://www.wroniawy.prv.pl/

Wroniawy [vrɔˈɲavɨ] is a village in the administrative district of Gmina Wolsztyn, within Wolsztyn County, Greater Poland Voivodeship, in west-central Poland.
