= Nowe Tłoki =

- Settlement
- Location within Poland
- Coordinates: 52°8′N 16°8′E
- Country: Poland
- Voivodeship: Greater Poland
- County: Wolsztyn
- Gmina: Wolsztyn
- Population: 471

Nowe Tłoki [ˈnɔvɛ ˈtwɔki] is a settlement in the administrative district of Gmina Wolsztyn, within Wolsztyn County, Greater Poland Voivodeship, in west-central Poland.
