= Berzyna =

- Village
- Location within Poland
- Coordinates: 52°5′55″N 16°6′43″E
- Country: Poland
- Voivodeship: Greater Poland
- County: Wolsztyn
- Gmina: Wolsztyn

Berzyna [bɛˈʐɨna] is a village in the administrative district of Gmina Wolsztyn, within Wolsztyn County, Greater Poland Voivodeship, in west-central Poland.
