= Nowa Obra, Wolsztyn County =

Nowa Obra
- Village
- Location within Poland
- Coordinates: 52°3′37″N 16°1′59″E
- Country: Poland
- Voivodeship: Greater Poland
- County: Wolsztyn
- Gmina: Wolsztyn
- Population: 3

Nowa Obra [ˈnɔva ˈɔbra] is a village in the administrative district of Gmina Wolsztyn, within Wolsztyn County, Greater Poland Voivodeship, in west-central Poland.
