= Reklinek =

- Village
- Location within Poland
- Coordinates: 52°10′N 16°1′E
- Country: Poland
- Voivodeship: Greater Poland
- County: Wolsztyn
- Gmina: Siedlec

Reklinek [rɛˈklinɛk] is a village in the administrative district of Gmina Siedlec, within Wolsztyn County, Greater Poland Voivodeship, in west-central Poland.
