= Grójec Wielki, Greater Poland Voivodeship =

Grójec Wielki
- Village
- Location within Poland
- Coordinates: 52°11′N 15°54′E
- Country: Poland
- Voivodeship: Greater Poland
- County: Wolsztyn
- Gmina: Siedlec

Grójec Wielki (Polish pronunciation: [ˈɡrujɛts ˈfjɛlkʲi]) is a village in the administrative district of Gmina Siedlec, within Wolsztyn County, Greater Poland Voivodeship, in west-central Poland.
