= Wilcze, Greater Poland Voivodeship =

Wilcze
- Village
- Location within Poland
- Coordinates: 52°1′N 15°58′E
- Country: Poland
- Voivodeship: Greater Poland
- County: Wolsztyn
- Gmina: Wolsztyn

Wilcze [ˈvilt͡ʂɛ] is a village in the administrative district of Gmina Wolsztyn, within Wolsztyn County, Greater Poland Voivodeship, in west-central Poland.
