= Niałek Wielki =

- Village
- Location within Poland
- Coordinates: 52°7′N 16°6′E
- Country: Poland
- Voivodeship: Greater Poland
- County: Wolsztyn
- Gmina: Wolsztyn
- Population: 662

Niałek Wielki (Polish pronunciation: [ˈɲawɛk ˈfjɛlkʲi]) is a village in the administrative district of Gmina Wolsztyn, within Wolsztyn County, Greater Poland Voivodeship, in west-central Poland.
