= Siwki (Easter tradition) =

Tradition

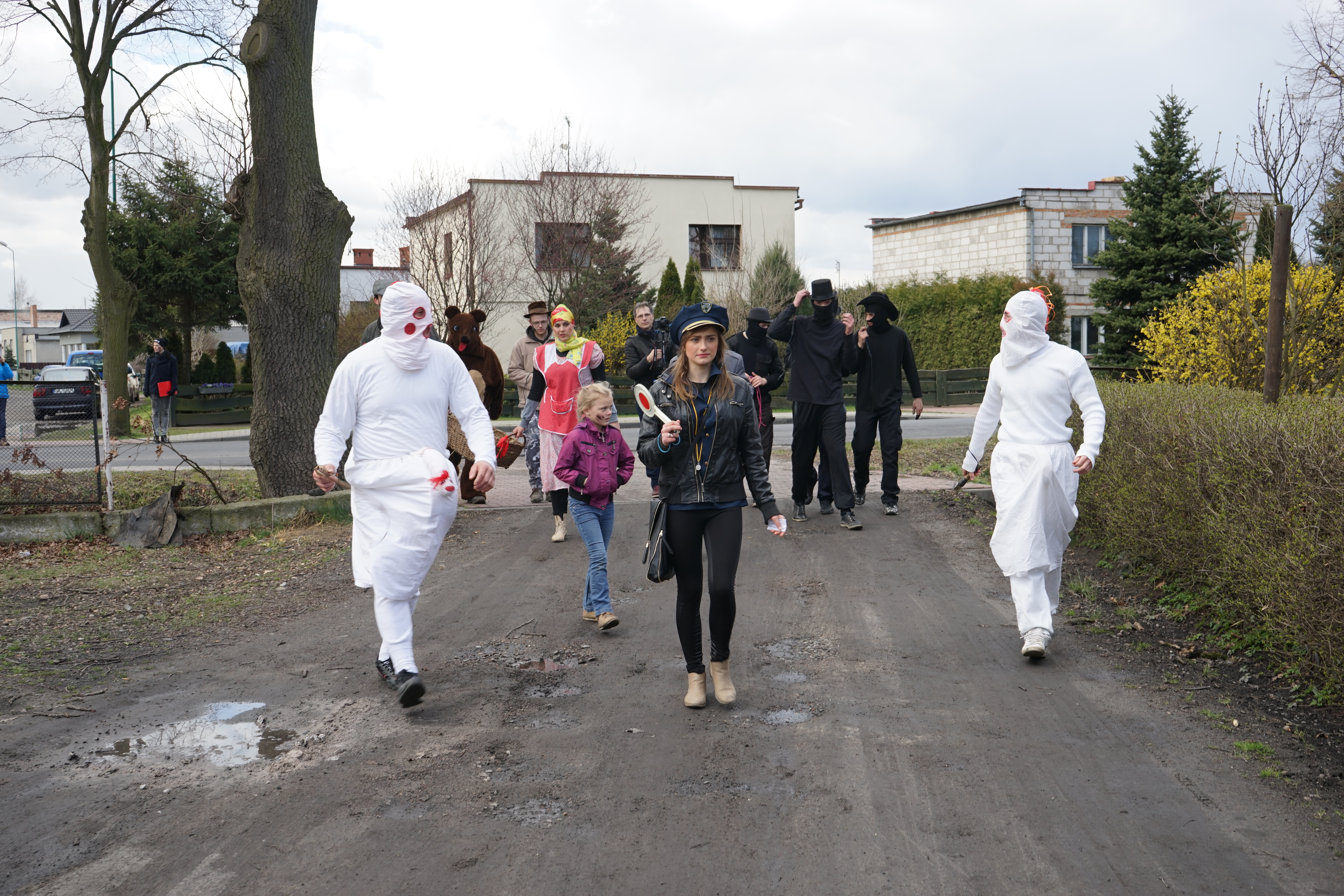
Siwki procession in Chobienice, 2015

Siwki or Siwek (literally Easter Greys, as in grey horses) is a regional tradition rooted in Polish folklore, in which a procession of dressed up individuals stops passers-by and performs tricks on them. The event usually takes place on Easter Sunday or Easter Monday.

The map of Polish Easter processions devised by Andrzej Brencz demonstrates that similar processions take place in areas where villages are close to each other. The area where the Easter Greys tradition is observed stretches between Międzychód, Wolsztyn and Poznań in Poland's region of Greater Poland. The Greys are an example of immaterial cultural heritage of the region.

== The origins of the custom and the name ==
The origins of the custom are not clear: the name suggests parades of grey horses. Siwek in Polish means a grey horse or mare. The procession is named after the Grey Horse – the main character in the procession. In the past, the procession was led by a rider on a grey horse (or a man leading two grey horses).

Stanisław Błaszczyk suggested that the horse and the bear are an allegory of departing winter. However, Andrzej Brencz invalidated this theory: the procession takes place in spring only because the time of the celebration has been shifted, as often happens with rituals. It has been proven that similar processions of riders (German: Schimmelreiter) on grey horses took place in the region of Pomerania (as mapped by Zofia Staszczak), as well as in the regions of Warmia and Masuria, except there they took place around Christmas, often on Christmas Eve.

Today the people participating in the custom dress up in white clothes and face masks with holes for eyes and mouth, while puppets of horses are tied to their waists. Andrzej Brencz suggests that the ritual refers to old Slavic rituals, connected with the cult of the horse, and is supposed to bring good harvest and wealth.

== The Greys as celebrated in Chobienice ==
In Chobienice, the Greys are recalled by the oldest community members, who know the tradition from pre-war sources. A Greys procession had been photographed by the first cameras available in the region. Although the custom's origins differ from those of Western and Central Greater Poland, a number of similarities can be noticed in the procession's line-up and characters' functions.

Today this traditional procession draws a crowd of participants, followers, residents and their families. The group has an informal leader, often drawn from the community's leaders: members of the communal council, cultural centre staff, volunteer firefighters or the Farmers' Wives Association members.

=== The characters ===
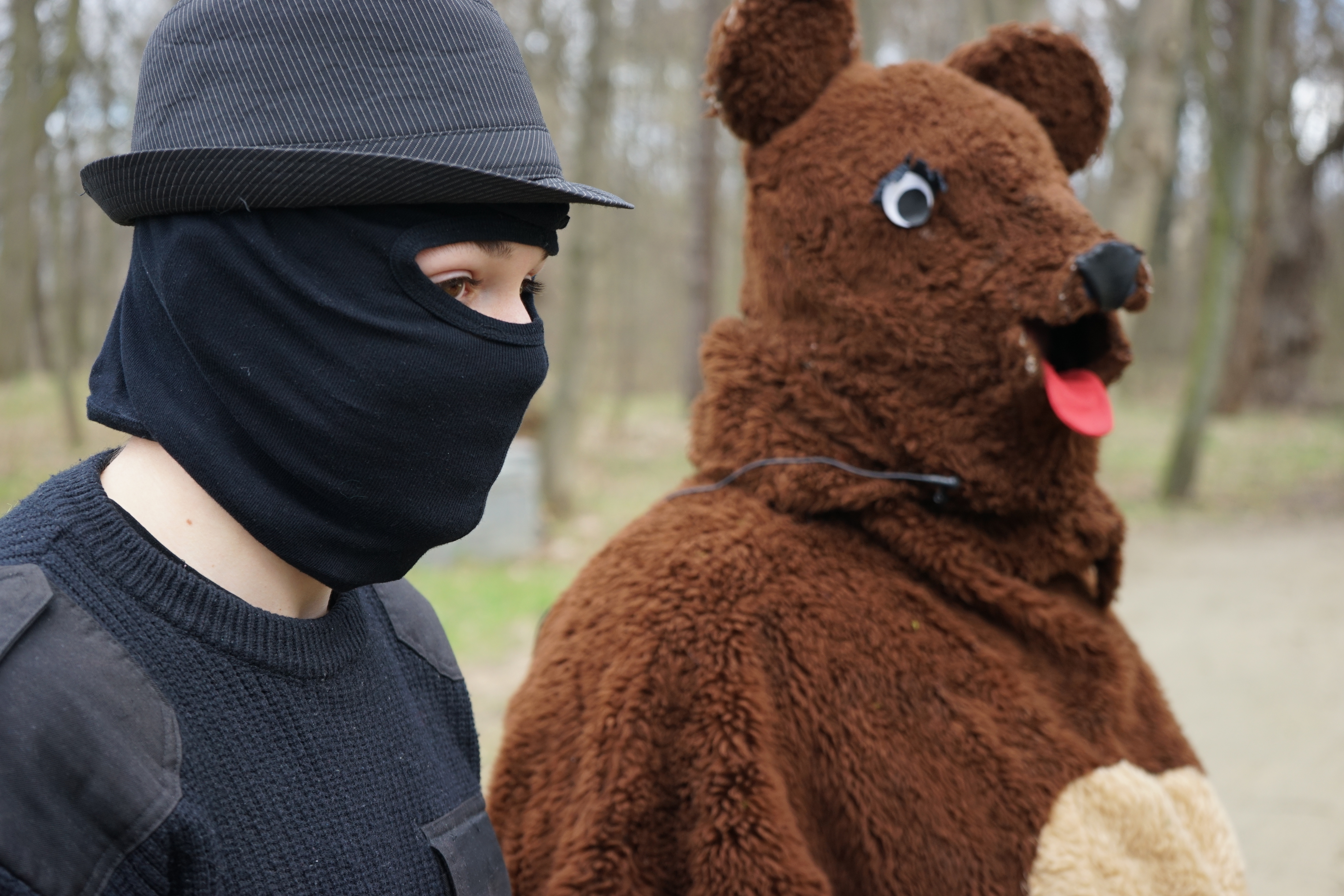
The Bear and the Chimney Sweep, Chobienice, 2015

The procession is composed of various characters – some of them are key figures and are present each spring. Each year those are the greys (usually half a dozen or so), a group of chimney sweeps, the old man and woman, policemen and musicians.

==== The Bear ====
The colourful procession borrows motifs from similar carnival events: the bear was traditionally tied with a straw rope, typical for ber, a traditional procession popular across Greater Poland. Today the bear wears fluffy, brown clothes and a mask. A chain is tied around the bear's waist and its jangling alerts residents about the Greys' approach.

==== The Police Officer ====
The police officer is another indication of the syncretic way of selecting procession characters: this character resembles the leader of similar żandary parades from Poznań. The police officer leads the procession, marches in the front and chooses the route. Police officers stop cars passing by to give the drivers "holiday fines" and knock on the doors of nearby houses so the hosts admit the procession and offer the participants some refreshments. The police officer collects donations offered by passers-by, drivers or other people. The person playing this role must be sociable and able to integrate the group and make people laugh.

==== The Chimney Sweep ====
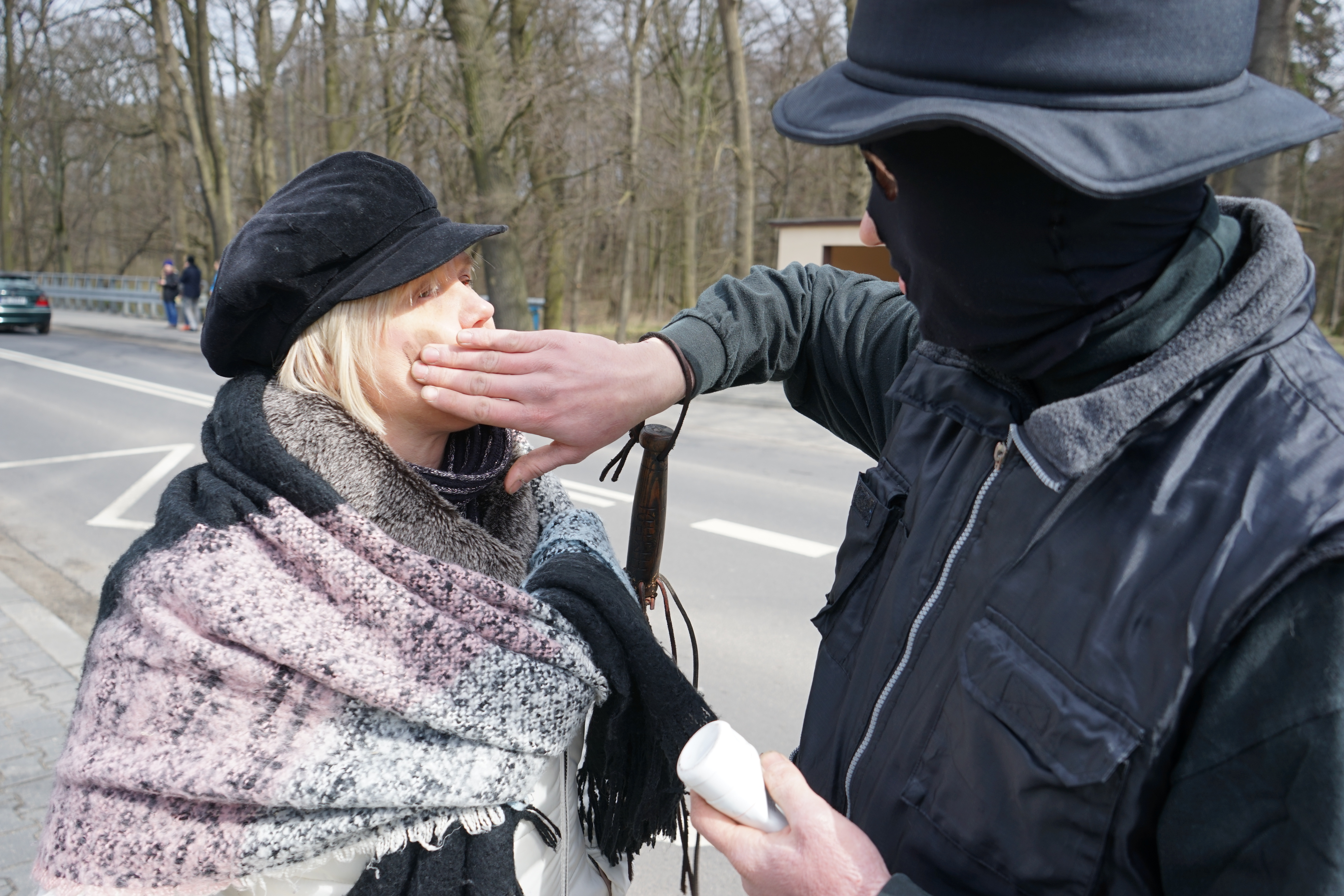
A Chimney Sweep smearing a girl's face with tar

Chimney sweeps are a popular ludic element and appear every year. Their task has been to smear people with soot (nowadays replaced by shoe polish). It is usually applied with a gloved or naked hand on the targeted person's face, or by pretending to shake hands. In recent years the chimney sweeps have also used whips made from short pieces of rope to whip the legs of the passers-by. These characters enliven the procession and chase the children.

The custom of smearing is well known in Polish ethnography – for example, in the customs observed in Greater Poland a similar role is played by Green week procession characters called "dirtiers" (Polish: smolarze, lit. tar-makers). Stanisław Błaszczyk observed: “they pelt children with mud, but kids still return to be chased away screaming, only to come back again”.

==== The Grey Horse ====
Each year there are about half a dozen Greys in Chobienice. The character is dressed up in white clothes, often made from bed linen or a first communion alb. The Greys' heads and necks are covered with white balaclava-like head coverings featuring openings for eyes and mouth. The symbolic horse is the most important element of the outfit. It takes the form of a horse's puppet, made from two plastic hoops and covered with white fabric. The hoops are usually cut out from plastic buckets (earlier – flour sieves). Red accents appear on shoelaces, as mask contour lines, on the top of the balaclava, or as symbolic drawings of a horse's head and tail.

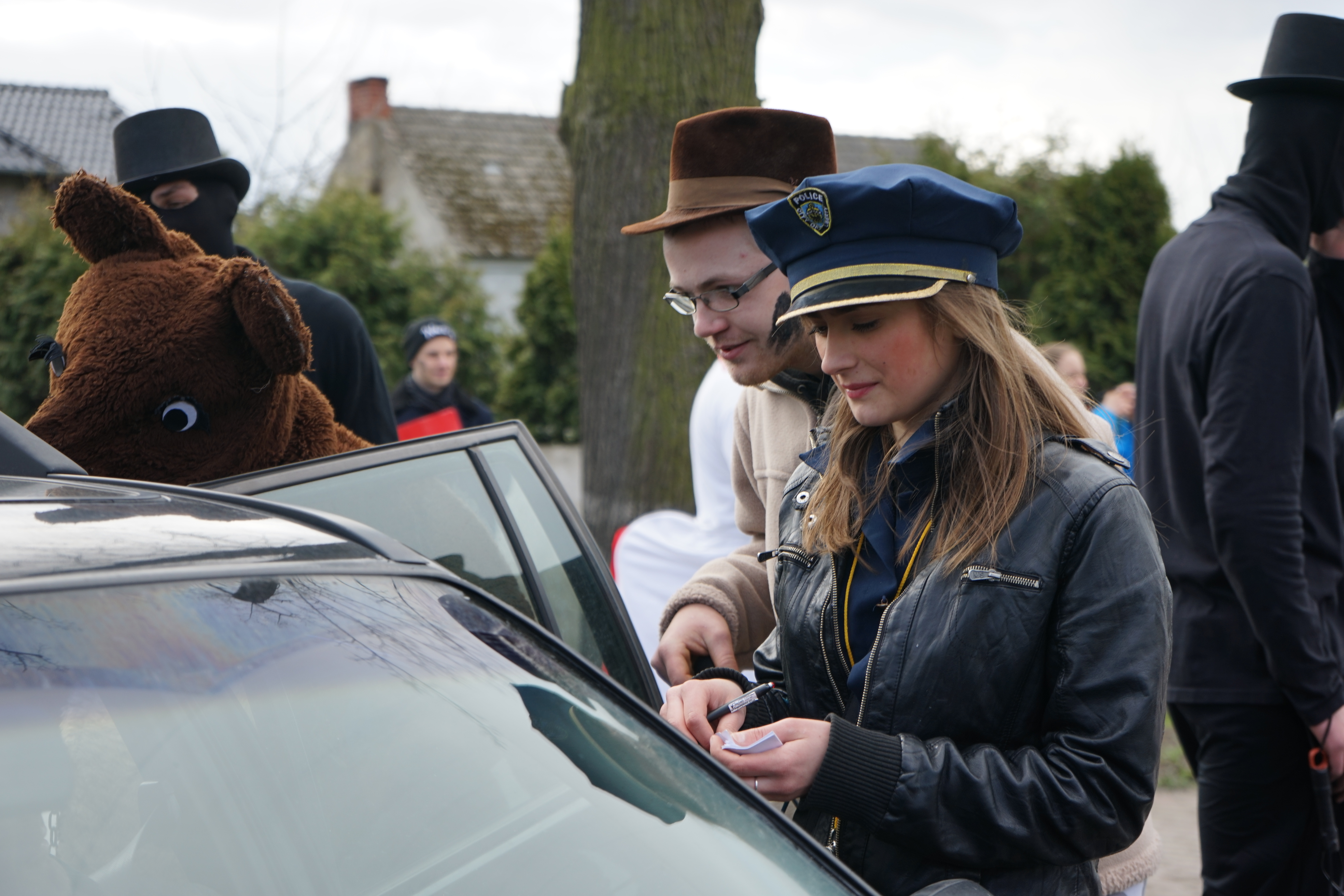
One of the roles of the Police Officer is to stop passers-by and fine them with "holiday tickets".

The Greys' task is to chase children and smack passers-by with whips: willow twigs were commonly used for this purpose, which is a reference to the tradition of whipping with green twigs on Easter Monday. Oskar Kolberg mentioned the custom: "On the second and third day of Easter in the Chełm region the custom of dyngus, or whipping, takes place... In Michałów and Dobrzyń they do the same, but also spill water over each other. Each of the shepherds walks from house to house and whips others with twigs”.

Andrzej Brencz notes: “Probably the custom of Easter whipping and the other custom of whipping people with twigs on Good Friday are connected to old, ritualized magical rites, which were supposed to transfer the strength of the green twigs to the person being hit with them”.

==== The Old Man and Old Woman ====
The old couple is an inseparable pair who carry together a large, wicker, straw-lined basket. The characters' task is to sing and dance for the visited hosts and collect donations into the basket: eggs, alcoholic drinks, sweets. The woman dressed up as the 'old woman' wears strong makeup, since in the past men took this role and the makeup had been a playful way of impersonating the other gender. The old woman's clothes are kitschy and multicoloured, she wears an apron and a headscarf. The old man wears loose clothes and a hat.

==== The Musicians ====
The musicians usually – but not always – come from the local community. Dressed in colourful clothes, they march along with the others, sometimes for hours, singing and playing folk or popular melodies. The music had a number of functions: it provided a rhythm for the procession; integrated the procession members with the audience (popular melodies allow the onlookers to feel involved). Finally, it gives a host entertaining the Greys an opportunity to dance or sing.
