= Nowa Dąbrowa, Wolsztyn County =

Nowa Dąbrowa
- Village
- Location within Poland
- Coordinates: 52°4′N 16°10′E
- Country: Poland
- Voivodeship: Greater Poland
- County: Wolsztyn
- Gmina: Wolsztyn
- Population: 402

Nowa Dąbrowa [ˈnɔva dɔmˈbrɔva] is a village in the administrative district of Gmina Wolsztyn, within Wolsztyn County, Greater Poland Voivodeship, in west-central Poland.
