= Mariankowo, Greater Poland Voivodeship =

Mariankowo
- Village
- Location within Poland
- Coordinates: 52°13′10″N 16°2′27″E
- Country: Poland
- Voivodeship: Greater Poland
- County: Wolsztyn
- Gmina: Siedlec
- Population: 140

Mariankowo [marjanˈkɔvɔ] is a village in the administrative district of Gmina Siedlec, within Wolsztyn County, Greater Poland Voivodeship, in west-central Poland.
