= Łochów =

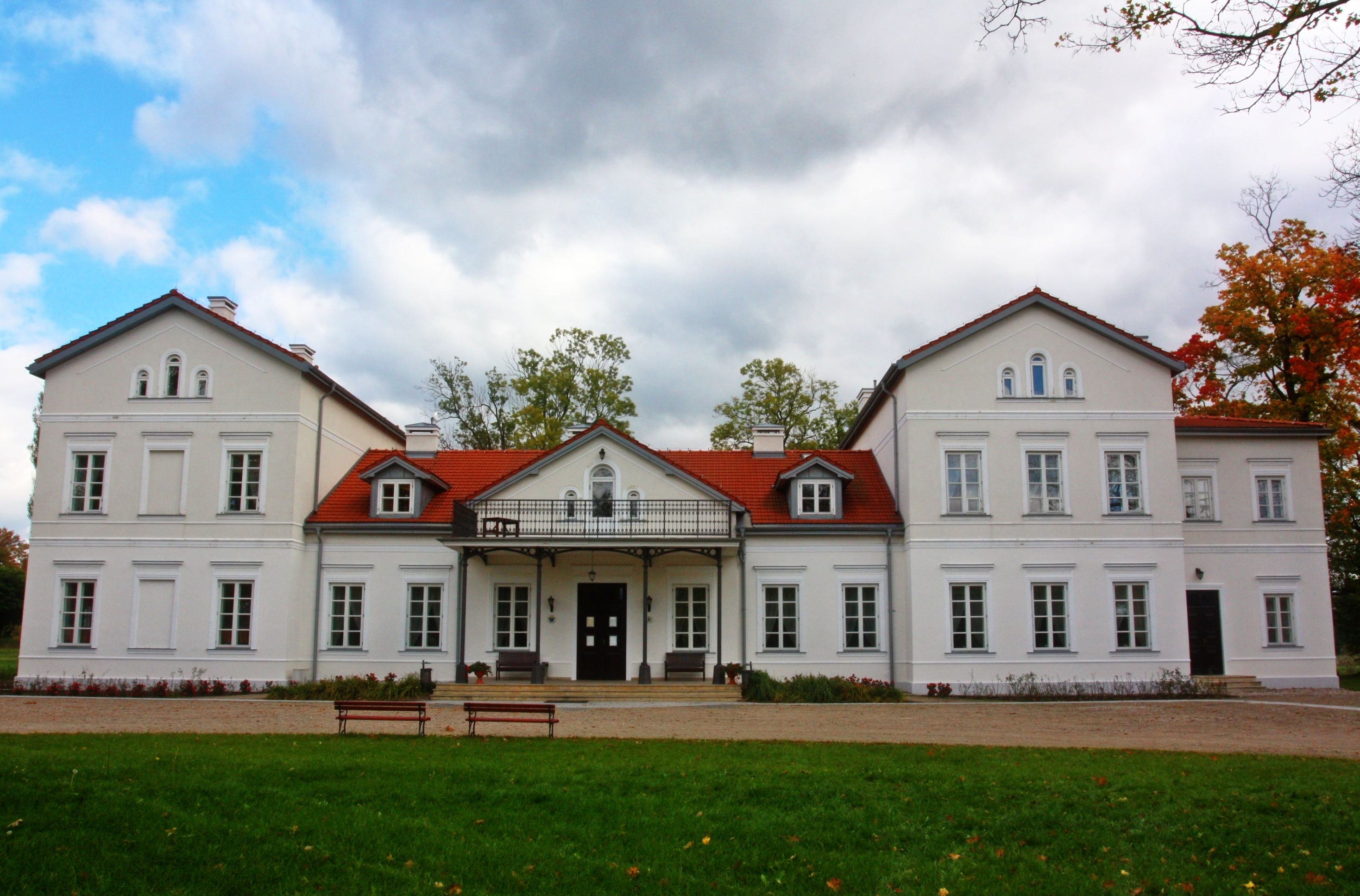
- Manor house in Łochów

- Flag Coat of arms

- Location within Poland
- Coordinates: 52°31′54″N 21°42′38″E
- Country: Poland
- Voivodeship: Masovian
- County: Węgrów
- Gmina: Łochów
- Town rights: 1969

Government
  - Mayor: Robert Gołaszewski

Area
  - Total: 13.35 km^{2} (5.15 sq mi)
- Elevation: 103 m (338 ft)

Population (2006)
  - Total: 6,452
  - Density: 483.3/km^{2} (1,252/sq mi)
- Time zone: UTC+1 (CET)
  - Summer (DST): UTC+2 (CEST)
- Postal code: 07-130
- Area code: +48 25
- Car plates: WWE
- Website: http://www.gminalochow.pl/

Łochów [ˈwɔxuf] is a town in the Węgrów County, Masovian Voivodeship, the seat of the urban-rural Gmina Łochów, eastern Poland. According to data from 31 December 2005, the city had 6,654 inhabitants. Łochów is located on the banks of the Liwiec River, adjacent to the large Łochów forest.

== History ==
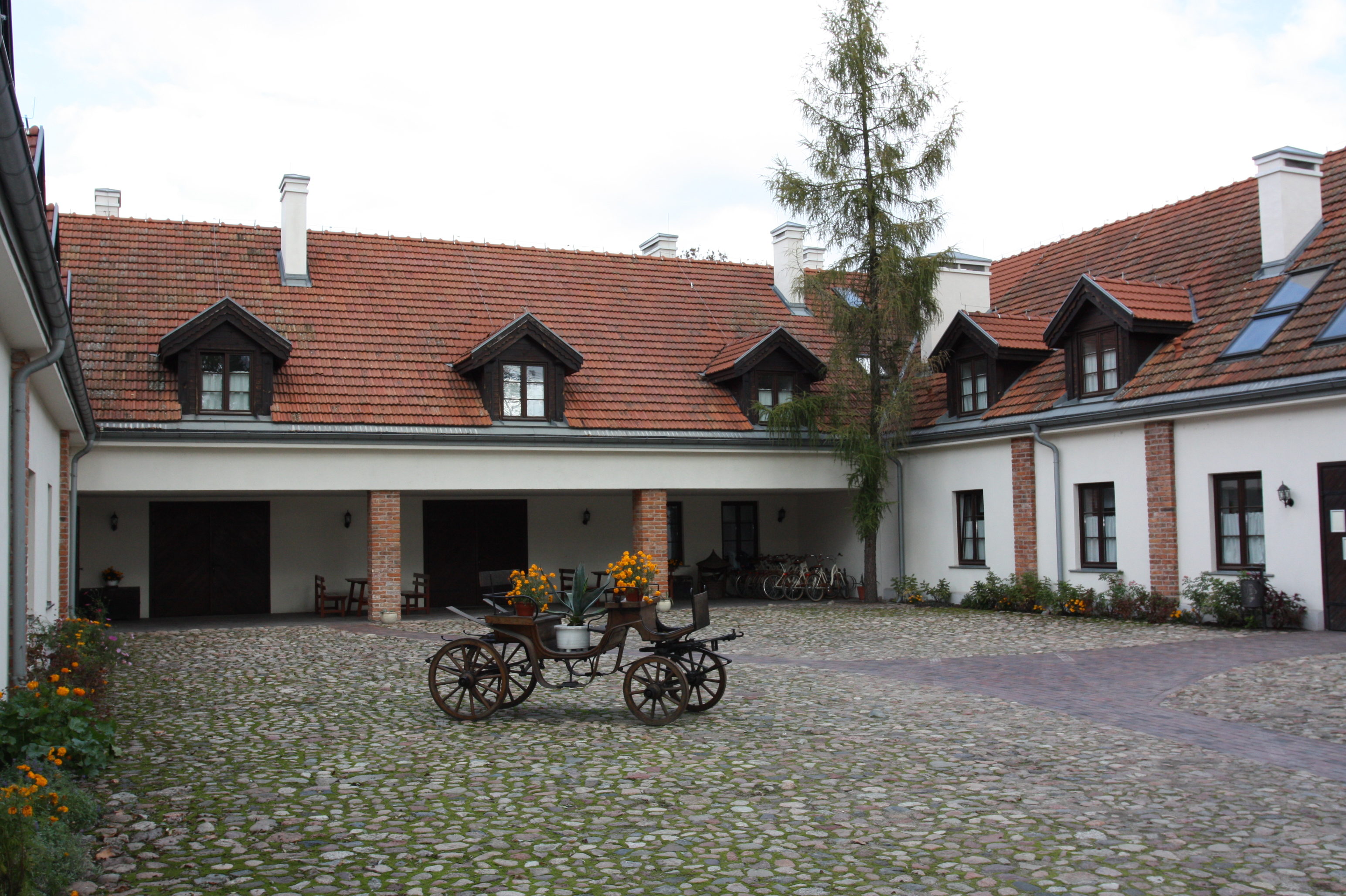
Old carriage house

Łochów has been known since the Middle Ages. The first mention of the town date back to the 14th century. Initially it was a princely settlement on the edge of the Kamieniecka Forest called Łochowiecz.

As of the late 19th century, Łochów had a brewery, distillery and water mill. In 1919, Łochów became the property of the Kurnatowski nobel family as dowry for Isabella Zamoyska. The new owner of Łochów was Eryk Kurnatowski.

During World War II, Łochów was occupied by Germany from 1939 to 1944.

In the years 1975-1998 the town administratively belonged to the Siedlce Voivodeship.

== Transport ==
Łochów lies on the intersection of national roads 50 and 62.

There is a railway station in Łochów, part of the important Polish railway line no. 6, connecting Zielonka in the Warsaw metropolitan area with Białystok and Kuźnica.
