= Jażyniec =

- Village
- Location within Poland
- Coordinates: 52°5′N 16°1′E
- Country: Poland
- Voivodeship: Greater Poland
- County: Wolsztyn
- Gmina: Siedlec

Jażyniec [jaˈʐɨɲɛt͡s] is a village in the administrative district of Gmina Siedlec, within Wolsztyn County, Greater Poland Voivodeship, in west-central Poland.
