= Karpicko =

- Village
- Location within Poland
- Coordinates: 52°7′N 16°7′E
- Country: Poland
- Voivodeship: Greater Poland
- County: Wolsztyn
- Gmina: Wolsztyn
- Population: 1,443

Karpicko [karˈpit͡skɔ] is a village in the administrative district of Gmina Wolsztyn, within Wolsztyn County, Greater Poland Voivodeship, in west-central Poland.
