= Grójec Mały, Greater Poland Voivodeship =

Grójec Mały
- Village
- Location within Poland
- Coordinates: 52°11′N 15°55′E
- Country: Poland
- Voivodeship: Greater Poland
- County: Wolsztyn
- Gmina: Siedlec

Grójec Mały [ˈɡrujɛt͡s ˈmawɨ] is a village in the administrative district of Gmina Siedlec, within Wolsztyn County, Greater Poland Voivodeship, in west-central Poland.
