= Wąchabno =

- Village
- Location within Poland
- Coordinates: 52°8′N 15°53′E
- Country: Poland
- Voivodeship: Greater Poland
- County: Wolsztyn
- Gmina: Siedlec

Wąchabno [vɔ̃ˈxabnɔ] is a village in the administrative district of Gmina Siedlec, within Wolsztyn County, Greater Poland Voivodeship, in west-central Poland.
