= Stara Dąbrowa, Wolsztyn County =

Stara Dąbrowa
- Village
- Location within Poland
- Coordinates: 52°5′31″N 16°10′38″E
- Country: Poland
- Voivodeship: Greater Poland
- County: Wolsztyn
- Gmina: Wolsztyn
- Population: 394

Stara Dąbrowa [ˈstara dɔmˈbrɔva] is a village in the administrative district of Gmina Wolsztyn, within Wolsztyn County, Greater Poland Voivodeship, in west-central Poland.
