= Zakrzewo, Wolsztyn County =

Zakrzewo
- Village
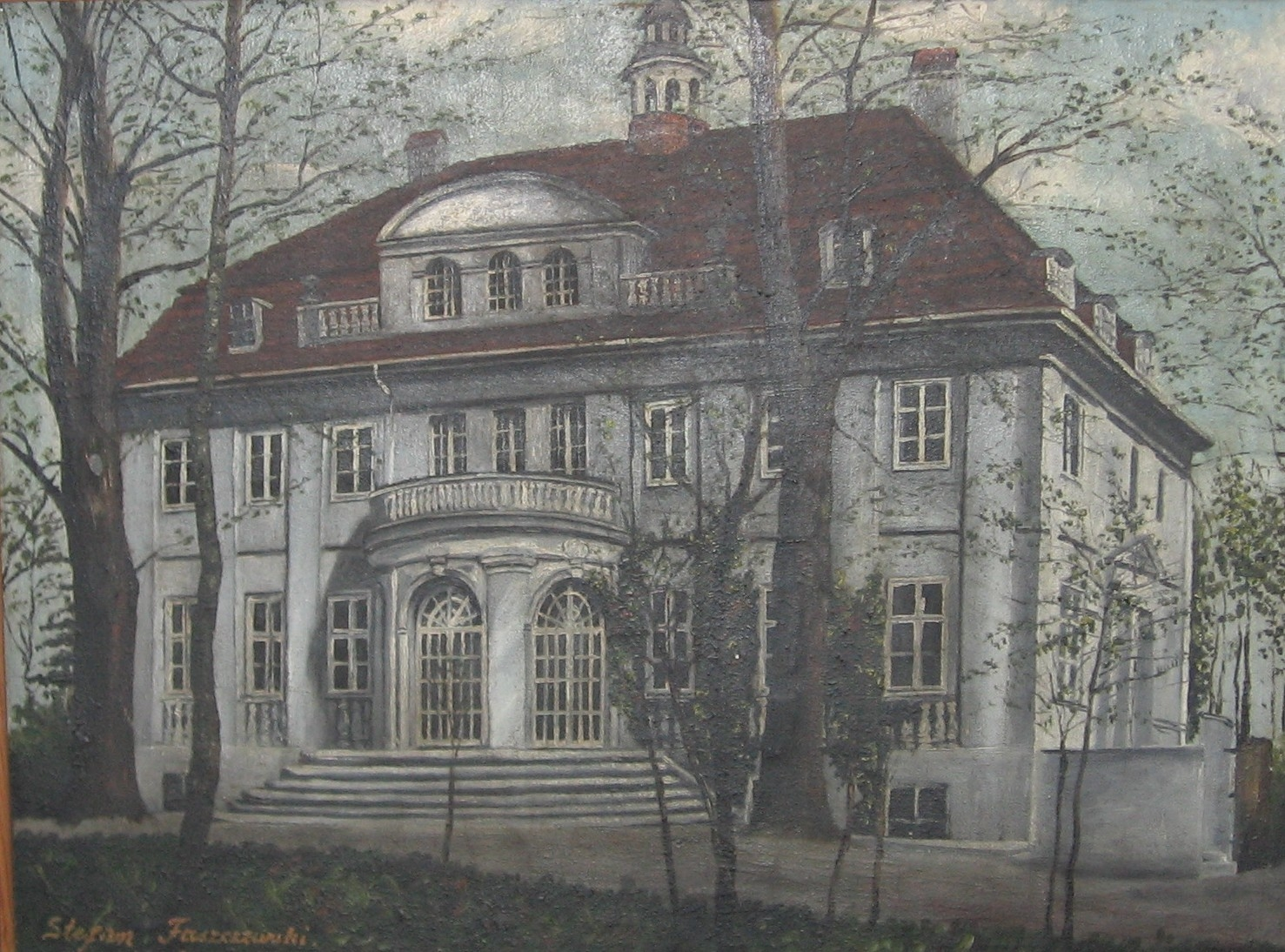
- Wierzchowiecki house in Zakrzewo (1920)

- Location within Poland
- Coordinates: 52°13′N 15°59′E
- Country: Poland
- Voivodeship: Greater Poland
- County: Wolsztyn
- Gmina: Siedlec
- Population: 351
- Website: http://www.siedlec.pl/cms_121_5.html

Zakrzewo [zaˈkʂɛvɔ] is a village in the administrative district of Gmina Siedlec, within Wolsztyn County, Greater Poland Voivodeship, in west-central Poland.
