= Wilhelm Koppe =

German Nazi and SS and police leader (1896–1975)

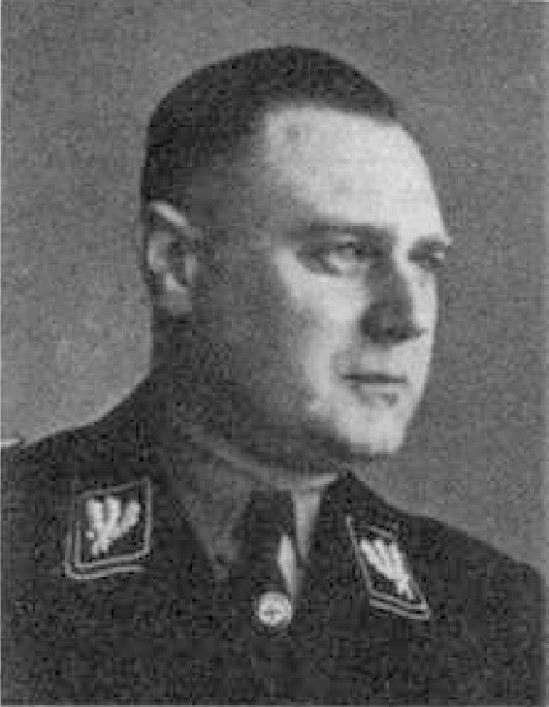
- Koppe, c. 1938

State Secretary for Security General Government
- In office 9 November 1943 – January 1945
- Preceded by: Friedrich-Wilhelm Krüger
- Succeeded by: Position abolished

Reichstag deputy
- In office 12 November 1933 – 8 May 1945

Personal details
- Born: Karl Heinrich Wilhelm Koppe; 15 June 1896 Hildesheim, Province of Hanover, Kingdom of Prussia, German Empire
- Died: 2 July 1975 (aged 79) Bonn, West Germany
- Resting place: Rüngsdorfer Friedhof
- Occupation: Wholesaler
- Civilian awards: Golden Party Badge

Military service
- Allegiance: German Empire; Nazi Germany
- Branch/service: Imperial German Army; Waffen-SS
- Years of service: 1914–1918; 1932–1945
- Rank: Leutnant; SS-Obergruppenführer and General of the Waffen-SS
- Unit: 9th Pioneer battalion
- Commands: Higher SS and Police Leader (HSSPF), "Warthe"; HSSPF, "Ost" (HSSPF) "Süd"
- Battles/wars: World War I World War II
- Military awards: Clasp to the Iron Cross, 2nd class War Merit Cross, 1st and 2nd class with swords Wound Badge

Karl Heinrich Wilhelm Koppe (15 June 1896 – 2 July 1975) was a German Nazi Party politician and an SS-Obergruppenführer and a General of the Waffen-SS. He held several high-level commands, including as the Higher SS and Police Leader in Reichsgau Wartheland and in the General Government during the German occupation of Poland in World War II. He was responsible for numerous atrocities against Jews and Poles during his tenure, including sending an estimated 145,000 of them to their deaths at the Chelmno extermination camp. After the end of the war, he escaped detection and arrest until 1960. Although West Germany began a criminal prosecution in 1964, it was terminated due to Koppe's ill health and he was never convicted.

== Early life and family ==
Koppe was born in Hildesheim, the son of a court bailiff. He attended private school in Stolzenau and graduated from the Realgymnasium in Harburg in 1914. He volunteered for military service with the Imperial German Army in October 1914 and fought in the First World War with the 9th Pioneer battalion. In December 1916, he was promoted to Leutnant of reserves. He was wounded in action in September 1917 but continued to serve until the Armistice of 11 November 1918, earning the Iron Cross, 1st and 2nd class and the Wound Badge. Discharged from the military the following month, Koppe pursued a career as a salesman and a self-employed wholesaler. He married in 1925 and had two children. His daughter, Ursula, married an aristocrat Arnold Freiherr von Rotberg, an Oberstleutnant in the German Bundeswehr and a descendant of Bavarian war minister Eduard Anton Freiherr von Rotberg.

== Interwar years in the SS ==
Koppe joined the Nazi Party on 1 September 1930 (membership number 305,584) and in December became the press advisor for Ortsgroup (local group) Harburg-Wilhelmsburg. As an early member of the Party, he later would be awarded the Golden Party Badge. He also served as an associate judge on the local party court. In June 1931, he joined the Nazi paramilitary unit, the Sturmabteilung (SA), but transferred to the Schutzstaffel (SS) on 2 January 1932 (SS number 25,955). Assigned to the 17th SS-Standarte, he was rapidly promoted and, by 1 September 1932, he was in command of that unit. He advanced to become Führer of SS-Abschnitt (district) XVII in Münster on 16 November 1933 and was promoted to SS-Oberführer on 20 April 1934. Another promotion, to SS-Brigadeführer, soon followed on 23 August and he was transferred to a staff position with SS-Oberabschnitt (main district) "Südwest" in Stuttgart. By 19 October, he was in command of SS-Abschnitt XXVI in the Free City of Danzig where he remained until taking up the post of chief of staff in SS-Oberabschnitt "Ost" in Berlin on 1 November 1935.

Promoted to SS-Gruppenführer on 13 September 1936, Koppe was transferred to the SD Main Office headed by Reinhard Heydrich and assigned as the Inspekteur der Sicherheitspolizei und des SD (IdS) "Südost" in Breslau, a command he held until succeeded by Arpad Wigand on 1 September 1937. From October 1936, he also held the post of commander of the SD-Oberabschnitt "Elbe", based in Leipzig until May 1937 and then in Dresden. At the same time, he served as the Inspector of the Sicherheitspolizei for SS-Oberabschnitt "Elbe" and, from March 1938, he directly commanded the state police main office (Staatspolizeileitstelle) in Dresden.

In addition to his SS career, Koppe was also active in Nazi Party politics. He was elected as a deputy to the Reichstag at the November 1933 election from electoral constituency 16 (South Hanover-Brunswick). At the March 1936 election, he switched to constituency 14 (Weser-Ems) which he represented until the fall of the Nazi regime.

== Wartime actions in occupied Poland ==
SS-Obergruppenführer Wilhelm Koppe salutes SS and German police troops

The Second World War began with the German invasion of Poland on 1 September 1939 and, on 26 October, Koppe was named the Higher SS and Police Leader (HSSPF) and the commander of the SS-Oberabschnitt "Warthe" in Reichsgau Wartheland, an area of Poland that was annexed to Germany. Also called the Warthegau, it was headed by Gauleiter Arthur Greiser. Nominally subordinate to Greiser, Koppe possessed a high degree of independence as the commander of all SS and police forces in the Warthegau. As the HSSPF, he reported to Heinrich Himmler and had a good working relationship with the Reichsführer-SS.

Koppe was also Himmler's plenipotentiary in the Warthegau in his capacity as Reich Commissioner for the Consolidation of German Nationhood. As such, Koppe was an active participant in the implementation of Nazi racial policies. He stated on 12 November 1939 that the formerly Polish lands were to be turned into territory for settlement by ethnic Germans (Volksdeutsche). He declared Jews and Polish intellectuals to be criminal elements that would have to be removed from the territory to ensure security and to provide jobs for the new settlers. To that end, they would have to be transported out of the Warthegau. He declared that he would make Posen (today, Poznań) "free from Jews" (Judenfrei). He immediately put into place a plan for the deportation of Poles and Polish Jews from the Warthegau to ghettos in the General Government to make room for ethnic German settlers. By the spring of 1940, the total number of Jews and Poles deported had reached over 128,000.

Koppe was involved in the Aktion T4 euthanasia program as the overall commander of Special Detachment (Sonderkommando) Lange, an SS squad which used gas vans to murder 1,558 mentally disabled asylum patients at the Soldau concentration camp in nearby Gau East Prussia during May and June 1940.

On 30 January 1942, Koppe was promoted to SS-Obergruppenführer and, in October 1943, Himmler selected him to replace SS-Obergruppenführer Friedrich-Wilhelm Krüger as HSSPF "Ost" and state secretary for security issues (Staatssekretär für das Sicherheitswesen) in the General Government, with headquarters in Kraków. In these posts, he was involved in the operations of the Chelmno extermination camp and the Warsaw concentration camp, as well as conducting ruthless operations against the Polish resistance. In response to Polish underground resistance activities, Koppe proposed shooting 50 Poles in retaliation each day and without trial. He also staged numerous public executions, such as ordering the hanging of 15 Poles in the village of Tuchorza on 9 June 1942, in retaliation for the killing of a German police officer. He organized the execution of more than 30,000 Polish patients suffering from tuberculosis, and ordered that all male relatives of identified resistance fighters should be executed, and the rest of their family sent to Nazi concentration camps.

Determined to strike back, the Polish Underground State ordered Koppe's death. Shortly after Koppe was made a General in the Waffen-SS on 1 July 1944, an attempted assassination resulted in his being wounded on 11 July 1944 in Kraków by a Kedyw unit – Battalion Parasol – in "Operation Koppe", part of "Operation Heads". Later in the year, with the Red Army approaching Poland, Koppe ordered all prisoners to be executed to prevent their being freed by the Soviets. After the Russians swept into Kraków in January 1945, Koppe was transferred to a staff position with Army Group Vistula, which was under Himmler's direct command. On 4 April, Koppe took up the post of HSSPF "Süd" in Munich where he remained until Germany's surrender on 8 May. During the war, Koppe was awarded the Clasp to the Iron Cross, second class and the War Merit Cross, 1st and 2nd class with swords.

== Post-war life and prosecution ==
In May 1945, Koppe went underground with fake identity papers assuming an alias (Lohmann, his wife's surname). He became the director of a chocolate factory in Bonn. In 1960, he was identified and arrested but released on bail on 19 April 1962. Criminal proceedings were initiated in the Bonn Landgericht (regional court) and his trial opened in October 1964. He was accused of being an accessory to the mass murder of 145,000 people in the Chelmno exterminations. The trial was halted, however, when Koppe's physicians attested that he suffered from circulatory disease, high blood pressure and vascular sclerosis, making him bedridden for most of the time. In August 1966, Bonn's public prosecutor terminated the proceedings. The German government refused a request for extradition from the government of Poland. Koppe died in 1975, aged 79, in Bonn.

== SS and police ranks ==
SS and police ranks
Date	Rank
2 January 1932	SS-Truppführer
1 September 1932	SS-Sturmhauptführer
30 January 1933	SS-Sturmbannführer
20 April 1933	Standartenführer
20 April 1934	Oberführer
23 August 1934	Brigadeführer
13 September 1936	Gruppenführer
20 April 1941	Gruppenführer und Generalleutnant der Polizei
30 January 1942	Obergruppenführer und General der Polizei
1 July 1944	General der Waffen-SS

== See also ==
- Holocaust in Poland
- List SS-Obergruppenführer

== Sources ==
- Arendt, Hannah (1992). Eichmann in Jerusalem: A Report on the Banality of Evil. Penguin Classics. ISBN 0-14-018765-0. Google Books link.
- Bartrop, Paul R.; Grimm, Eve E. (2019). Perpetrating the Holocaust: Leaders, Enablers, and Collaborators. ABC-CLIO. ISBN 978-1-440-85896-3.
- Datner, Szymon, Wilhelm Koppe - nieukarany zbrodniarz hitlerowski. Warszawa-Poznań, 1963
- de Mildt, Dick; de Mildt, Dirk Welmoed (1996). In the Name of the People: Perpetrators of Genocide...]. Martinus Nijhoff Publishers. ISBN 90-411-0185-3. Google Books link
- Epstein, Catherine (2010). Arthur Greiser and the Occupation of Western Poland. Oxford University Press. ISBN 978-0-191-61384-5
- Information about Wilhelm Koppe in the Reichstag database.
- Kania, Stanisław, Zbrodnie hitlerowskie w Polsce. Główna Komisja Badania Zbrodni Hitlerowskich w Polsce, Warszawa, 1983
- Kershaw, Ian (2000). Hitler 1936-1945: Nemesis. New York: W.W. Norton & Company, Inc. ISBN 0-393-04994-9. Google Books link.
- Miller, Michael D.; Schulz, Andreas (2015). Leaders of the SS & German Police. Vol. 2 Reichsführer SS – Gruppenführer (Hans Haltermann to Walter Kruger). R. James Bender Publishing. ISBN 978-1-932-97025-8.
- Madajczyk, Czesław, Polityka III Rzeszy w okupowanej Polsce. Państwowe Wydawnictwo Naukowe, Warszawa, 1970
- Williams, Max (2017). SS Elite: The Senior Leaders of Hitler's Praetorian Guard. Vol. 2. Fonthill Media LLC. ISBN 978-1-781-55434-0.
- Yerger, Mark C. (1997). The Allgemeine-SS: The Commands, Units and Leaders of the General SS. Schiffer Publishing Ltd. ISBN 0-7643-0145-4.
