= Godziszewo =

Godziszewo may refer to the following places:

- Godziszewo, Greater Poland Voivodeship (west-central Poland)
- Godziszewo, Pomeranian Voivodeship (north Poland)
- Godziszewo, West Pomeranian Voivodeship (north-west Poland)
