= Zygmunt Ginter =

Polish ice hockey player

- Born: March 12, 1916 Ruden, German Empire
- Died: March 1, 1964 (aged 47) Warsaw, Poland
- Position: Left wing
- Played for: Ognisko Wilno; Legia Warsaw
- National team: Poland
- Playing career: 1947–1948

Zygmunt Ginter (12 March 1916 – 1 March 1964) was a Polish ice hockey player. He played for Ognisko Wilno and Legia Warsaw during his career. He also played for the Polish national team at the 1948 Winter Olympics. He replaced Tadeusz Dolewski on the Olympic team right before the start of the tournament for reasons never made clear; it was only apparent that the switch was made some 50 years later, and Dolewski was listed as a participant in the Olympics, not Ginter.
