= Wielka Wieś, Wolsztyn County =

Wielka Wieś
- Village
- Location within Poland
- Coordinates: 52°05′28″N 15°54′23″E
- Country: Poland
- Voivodeship: Greater Poland
- County: Wolsztyn
- Gmina: Siedlec

Wielka Wieś [ˈvjɛlka ˈvjɛɕ] is a village in the administrative district of Gmina Siedlec, within Wolsztyn County, Greater Poland Voivodeship, in west-central Poland.
