= Krutla =

- Settlement
- Location within Poland
- Coordinates: 52°5′36″N 16°3′31″E
- Country: Poland
- Voivodeship: Greater Poland
- County: Wolsztyn
- Gmina: Wolsztyn

Krutla [ˈkrutla] is a settlement in the administrative district of Gmina Wolsztyn, within Wolsztyn County, Greater Poland Voivodeship, in west-central Poland.
