= Stara Tuchorza =

- Village
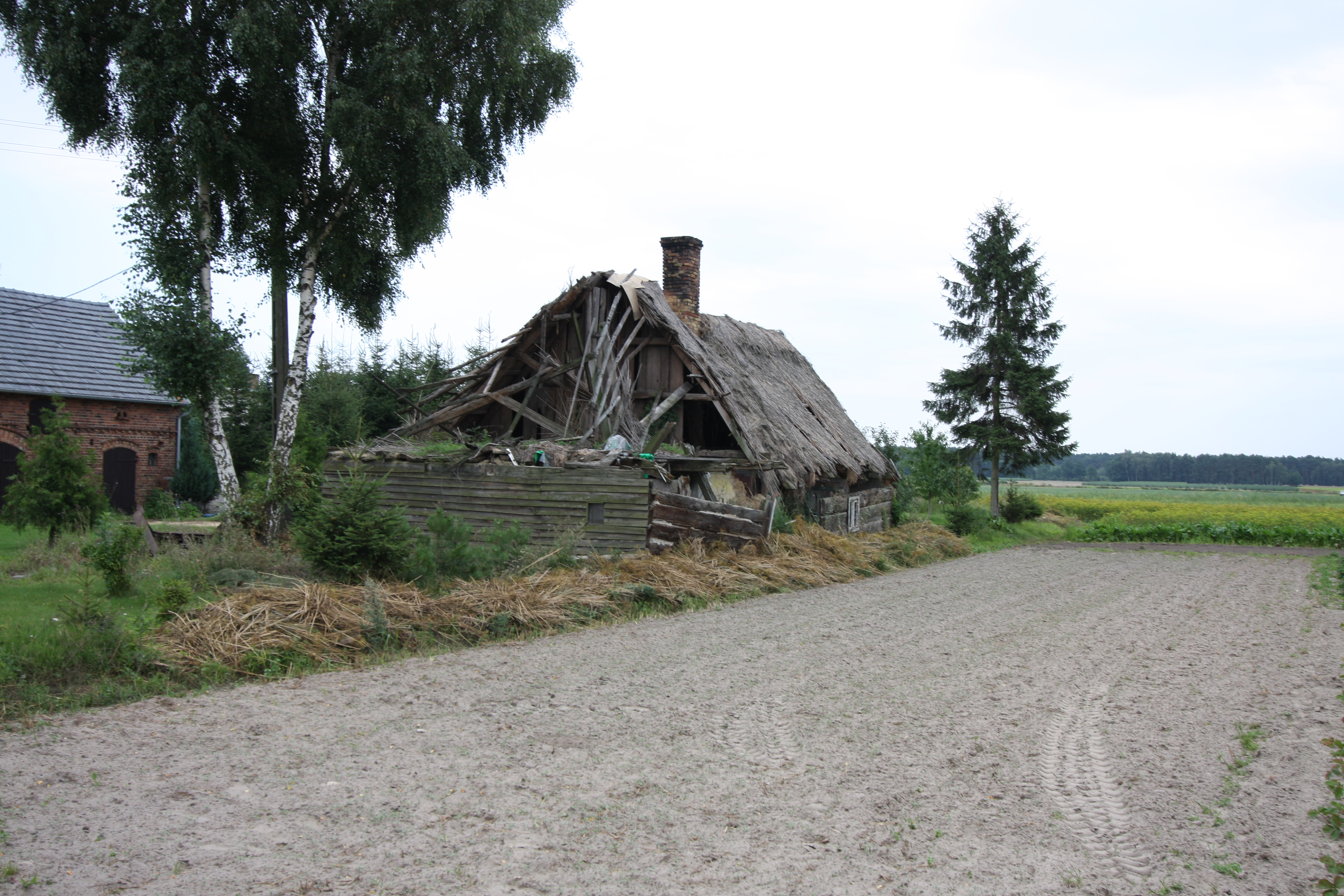

- Location within Poland
- Coordinates: 52°10′16″N 16°03′13″E
- Country: Poland
- Voivodeship: Greater Poland
- County: Wolsztyn
- Gmina: Siedlec

Stara Tuchorza [ˈstara tuˈxɔʐa] is a village in the administrative district of Gmina Siedlec, within Wolsztyn County, Greater Poland Voivodeship, in west-central Poland.
