= Siedlec, Wolsztyn County =

Siedlec
- Village
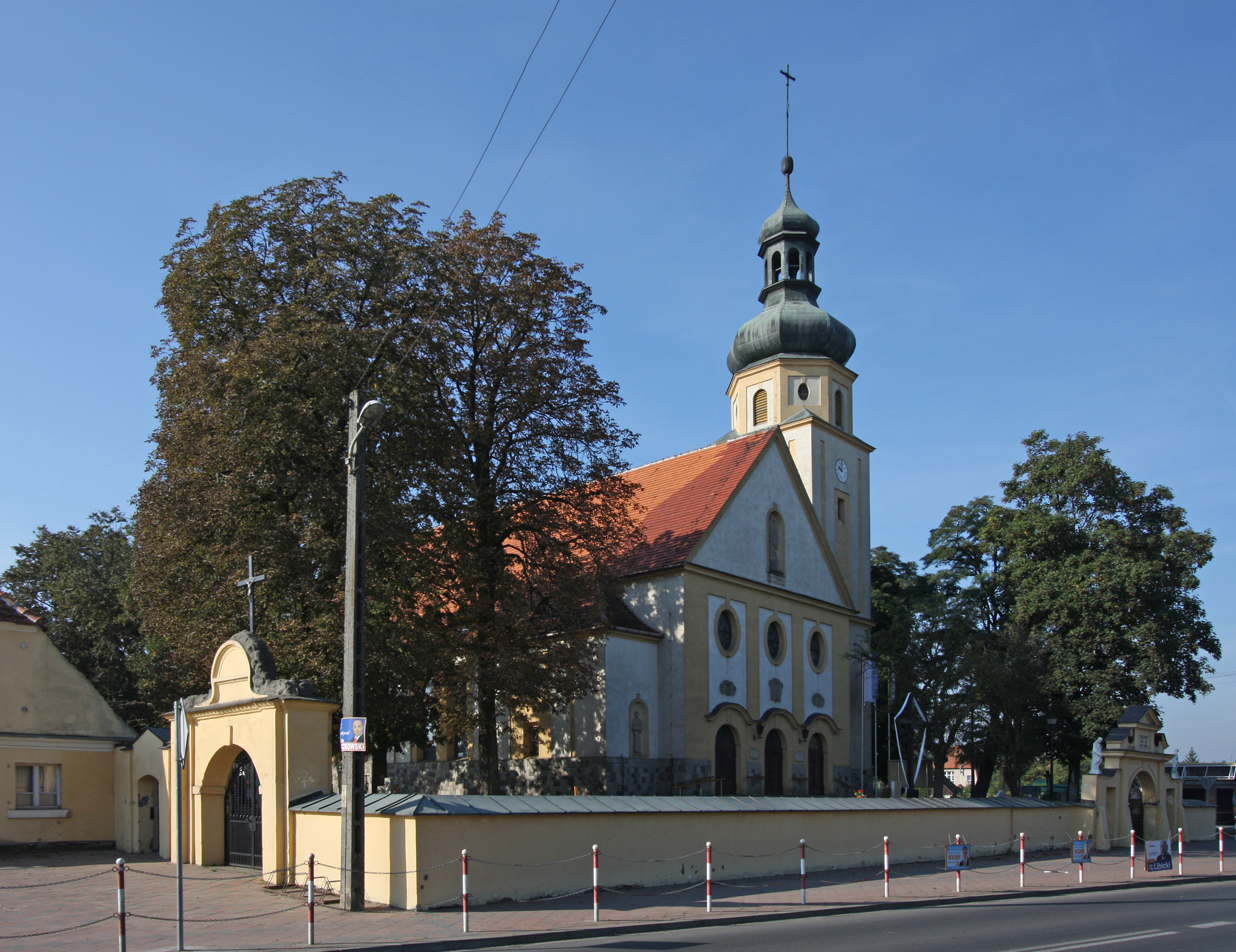
- Saint Michael Archangel church in Siedlec

- Location within Poland
- Coordinates: 52°8′N 16°1′E
- Country: Poland
- Voivodeship: Greater Poland
- County: Wolsztyn
- Gmina: Siedlec
- Population: 1,200
- Website: http://www.siedlec.pl/

Siedlec [ˈɕɛdlɛt͡s] is a village in Wolsztyn County, Greater Poland Voivodeship, in west-central Poland. It is the seat of the gmina (administrative district) called Gmina Siedlec.
