= Godziszewo, Greater Poland Voivodeship =

Godziszewo
- Village
- Location within Poland
- Coordinates: 52°11′39″N 15°57′58″E
- Country: Poland
- Voivodeship: Greater Poland
- County: Wolsztyn
- Gmina: Siedlec
- Population: 300

Godziszewo [ɡɔd͡ʑiˈʂɛvɔ] is a village in the administrative district of Gmina Siedlec, within Wolsztyn County, Greater Poland Voivodeship, in west-central Poland.
