= Tuchorza =

- Village
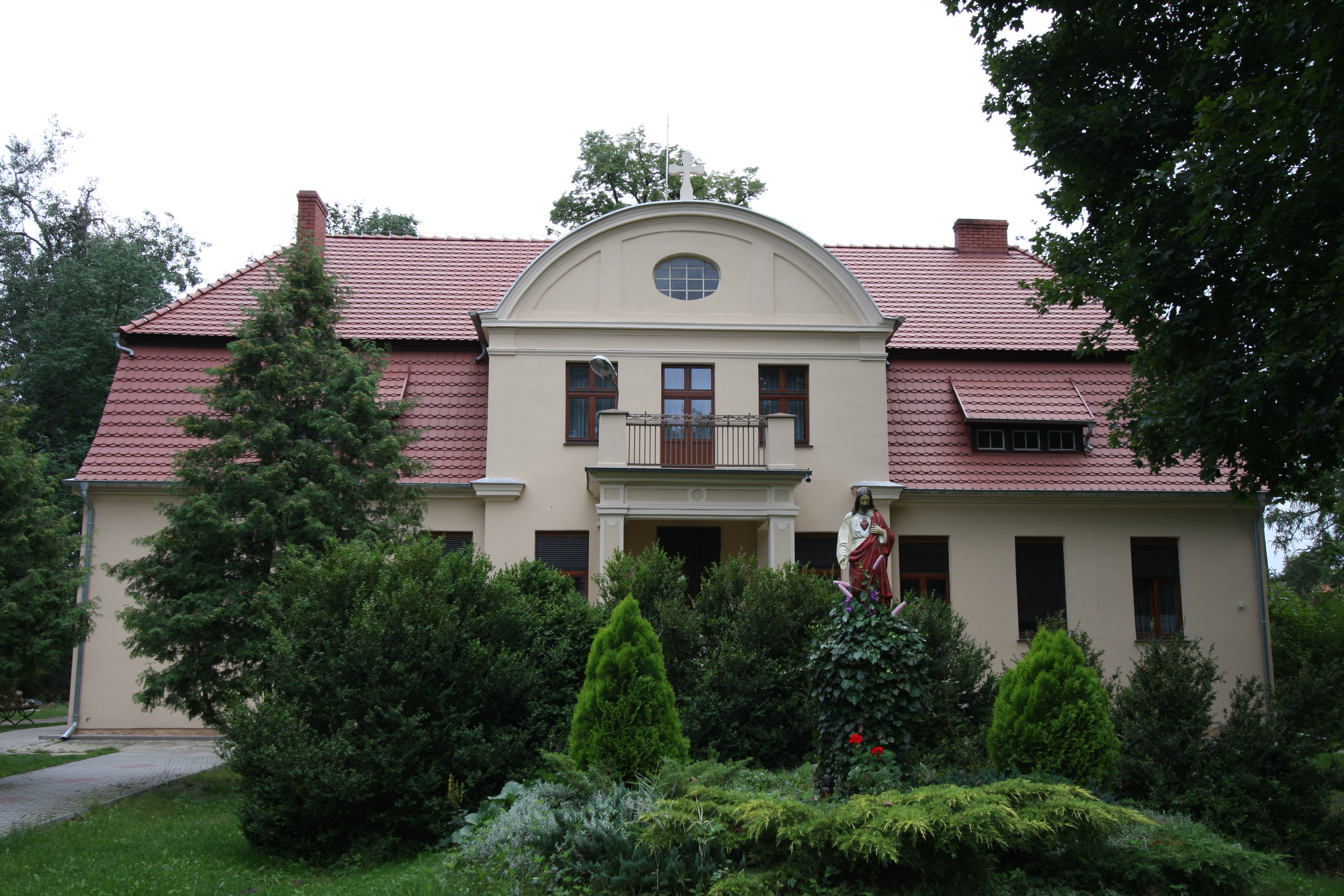

- Location within Poland
- Coordinates: 52°11′N 16°3′E
- Country: Poland
- Voivodeship: Greater Poland
- County: Wolsztyn
- Gmina: Siedlec
- Elevation: 60 m (200 ft)

Population
  - Total: 989
- Time zone: UTC+1 (CET)
  - Summer (DST): UTC+2 (CEST)
- Postal code: 64-232
- Vehicle registration: PWL

Tuchorza [tuˈxɔʐa] is a village in the administrative district of Gmina Siedlec, within Wolsztyn County, Greater Poland Voivodeship, in west-central Poland.

== History ==
Following the German-Soviet invasion of Poland, which started World War II in September 1939, the village was occupied by Germany until 1945. On 9 July 1942, the Germans carried out a public execution of 15 Poles in the village.
