= Wolf-Dietrich von Kurnatowski =

Priest and writer

Wolf-Dietrich von Kurnatowski was a canon and priest of the Christian Community. He earned a Doctor of Law at the University of Greifswald. He was the author of the genealogy of the House of Kurnatowski.

== Selected works ==
- St. Leonhard vor Braunschweig : Geschichte des Siechenhospitals, der Kirche und des Wirtschaftshofes [St. Leonhard vor Braunschweig: history of the hospital, the church, and the farmstead] (in German). Braunschweig: Waisenhaus-Buchdruckerei und Verlag. 1958. OCLC 73518450.
