= Powodowo–Luboń railway =

Railway line in Poland

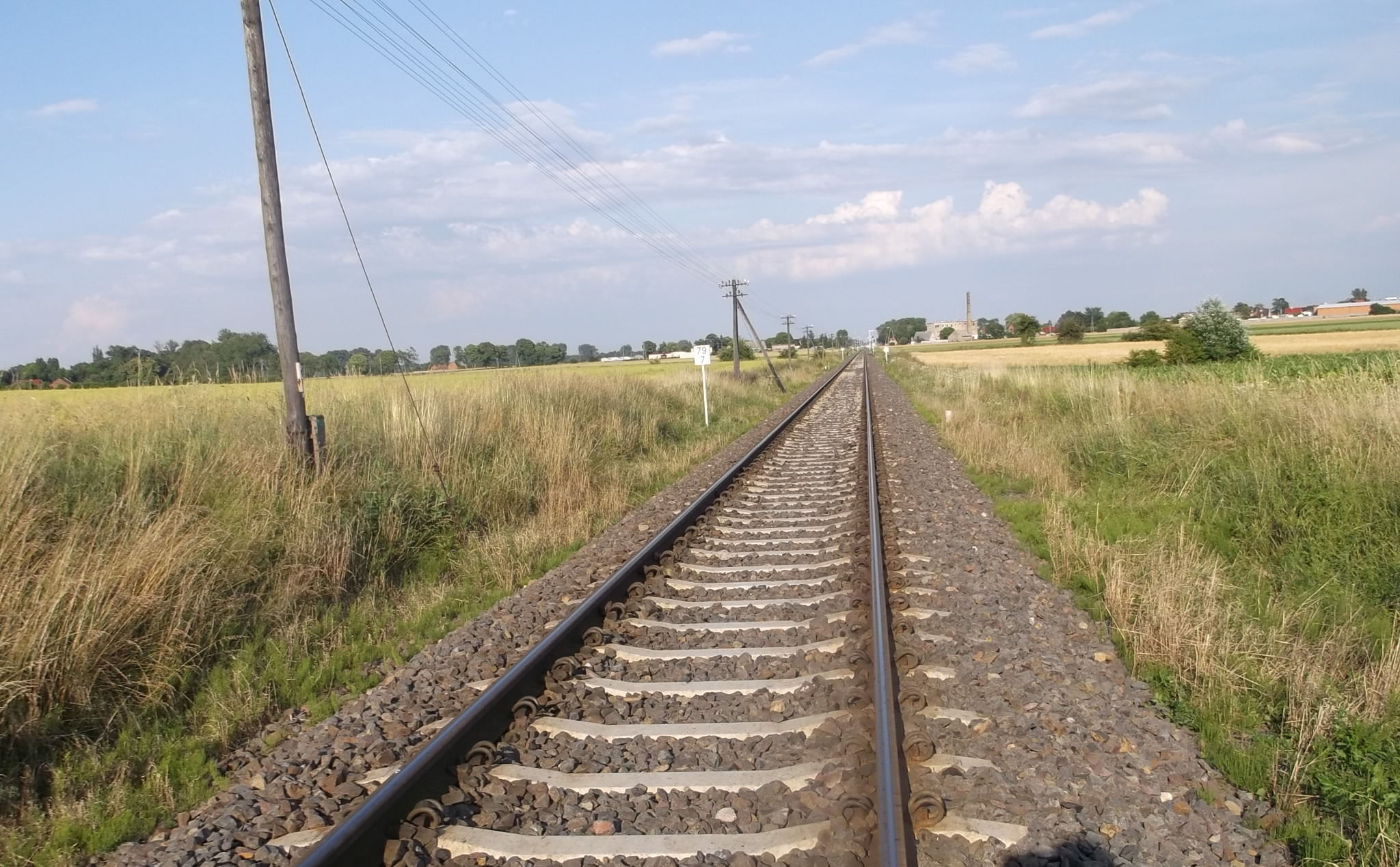
- Track near Granowo Nowotomyskie

Overview
- Status: in use, partly closed
- Locale: Poland
- Termini: Powodowo; Luboń

Service
- Type: Heavy rail
- Route number: PKP 357

History
- Opened: 1905

Technical
- Line length: 112 km (70 mi)
- Track gauge: 1,435 mm (4 ft 8 1/2 in) standard gauge
- Electrification: no
- Operating speed: 110 km/h (68 mph)

The Powodowo–Luboń railway is a partly non-operational Polish 112-kilometre long railway line, that used to connect Powodowo with Wolsztyn, Luboń, and further to Poznań .

== Opening ==
The line was opened in stages, the first section Sulechów - Wolsztyn was opened on 1 April 1905. Three months later, the line was extended to Grodzisk Wielkopolski. In July 1909 an extension was opened to Lubon.

== Closure ==
The single-track line between Sulechów and Wolsztyn operated by Lubuska Regional Railways was closed to passenger services in 1994. In 2001 freight traffic on the line was suspended and in 2005 the line was closed. Currently, this section is impassable in several places due to missing tracks, in Okuninie and on the section between Chwalim - Kargowa. In 2015, the track between Sulechów - Powodowo was completely removed.

== Modernisation ==
On 14 March 2011 the first stage of modernisation of the line between Wolsztyn and Poznan started. New tracks and sleepers were put in place, new platforms were built at Stęszew, Szreniawa and Wiry, railway crossings were modernised and a new signalling centre to control the trains on the line opened. This work was carried out within the framework of the Wielkopolska Regional Operational Programme 2007–2013, financed by European Regional Development Fund and national funds.

Renovation of the 73 kilometers of tracks cost 84 million zloty, 70% of this amount accounted for financing from EU funds under the Wielkopolska Regional Operational Programme (ROP) 2007–2013. After the modernization the trains can pass this route at a speed of 110 km per hour.

The line from Wolsztyn to Poznan was modernised under the supervision of a conservator as the modernisation efforts were made to preserve the historical appearance of the line on which passenger connections were operated by steam engines. For the duration of the works related to the modernisation of the railway line was closed, and services were serviced by bus replacement. On 11 December 2011, with the change of timetable of trains on the route, a direct rail service was restored.

Since 14 December 2014 trains stop at the new station of Grąblewo.

== Usage ==
The line is used by trains on regional services between Wolsztyn, Grodzisk Wielkopolski and Poznan.

== See also ==
- Railway lines of Poland
