= Karna, Poland =

Karna
- Village
- Location within Poland
- Coordinates: 52°10′N 15°59′E
- Country: Poland
- Voivodeship: Greater Poland
- County: Wolsztyn
- Gmina: Siedlec

Karna [ˈkarna] is a village in the administrative district of Gmina Siedlec, within Wolsztyn County, Greater Poland Voivodeship, in west-central Poland.

== History ==
The town was formed in the Middle Ages and has existed since at least the 13th century. Mentioned in 1238 in a Latin document as Carna, 1238 Tamo, 1400 Karna.

However, the town was settled earlier than archival documents indicate. Among the muddy meadows, on the Szarka, to the northeast, near the village, archaeologists found the remains of a two-part concave settlement with an internal diameter of approx. 100 m with a moat, which dates back to around the 9th to the mid-13th century. In the Middle Ages it was called "Roczków Ostrów". In 1925, a treasure silver hidden after 1080 was found in the village.

== Bibliography ==
Stefan Chmielewski: Słownik historyczno-geograficzny województwa poznańskiego w średniowieczu, cz. II (I-Ł) z.1, hasło: „Karna”. Wrocław: Ossolineum, 1988, p. 135-136.
