= Gmina Siedlec =

Gmina Siedlec Siedlec Commune
- Gmina
- Coat of arms

- Location within Poland
- Coordinates (Siedlec): 52°8′N 16°1′E
- Country: Poland
- Voivodeship: Greater Poland
- County: Wolsztyn
- Seat: Siedlec

Area
  - Total: 205.06 km^{2} (79.17 sq mi)

Population (2011)
  - Total: 12,420
  - Density: 60.57/km^{2} (156.9/sq mi)
- Website: www.siedlec.pl

Gmina Siedlec is a rural gmina (administrative district) in Wolsztyn County, Greater Poland Voivodeship, in west-central Poland. Its seat is the village of Siedlec, which lies approximately 8 kilometres (5 mi) west of Wolsztyn and 69 km (43 mi) south-west of the regional capital Poznań.

The gmina covers an area of 205.06 square kilometres (79.2 sq mi), and as of 2006 its total population was 12,008 (12,420 in 2011).

== Villages ==
Gmina Siedlec contains the villages and settlements of Belęcin, Boruja, Chobienice, Godziszewo, Grójec Mały, Grójec Wielki, Jaromierz, Jażyniec, Karna, Kiełkowo, Kiełpiny, Kopanica, Mała Wieś, Mariankowo, Nieborza, Nowa Tuchorza, Reklin, Reklinek, Siedlec, Stara Tuchorza, Tuchorza, Wąchabno, Wielka Wieś, Wojciechowo, Zakrzewo and Żodyń.

== Neighbouring gminas ==
Gmina Siedlec is bordered by the gminas of Babimost, Kargowa, Nowy Tomyśl, Rakoniewice, Wolsztyn and Zbąszyń.
