= Gościeszyn, Greater Poland Voivodeship =

Gościeszyn
- Village
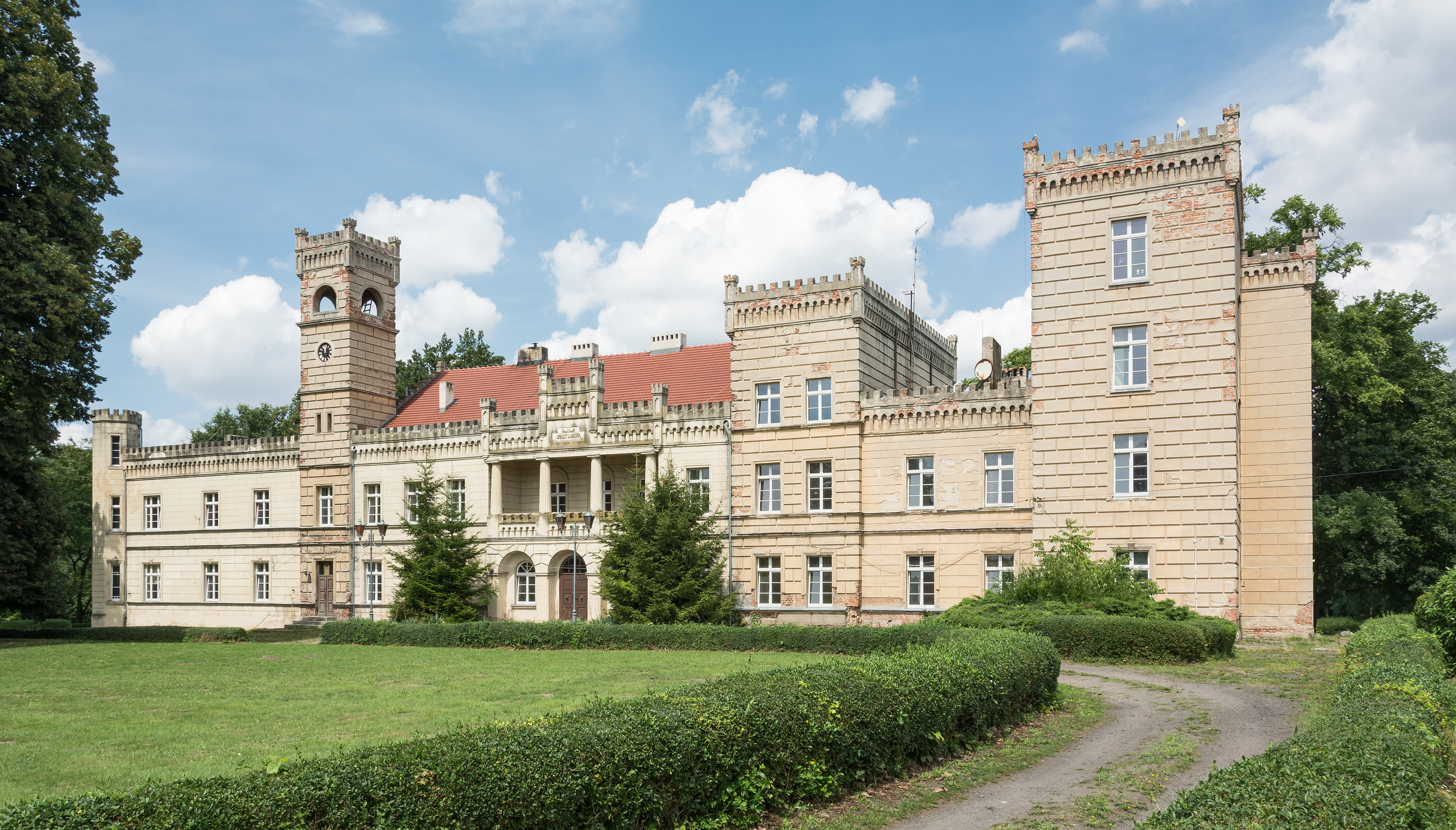
- Palace in Gościeszyn

- Location within Poland
- Coordinates: 52°6′N 16°13′E
- Country: Poland
- Voivodeship: Greater Poland
- County: Wolsztyn
- Gmina: Wolsztyn
- Population: 433

Gościeszyn (Polish: [ɡɔɕˈt͡ɕɛʂɨn]) is a village in the administrative district of Gmina Wolsztyn, within Wolsztyn County, Greater Poland Voivodeship, in west-central Poland.
