= Powodowo =

- Village
- Location within Poland
- Coordinates: 52°7′N 16°4′E
- Country: Poland
- Voivodeship: Greater Poland
- County: Wolsztyn
- Gmina: Wolsztyn
- Population: 571

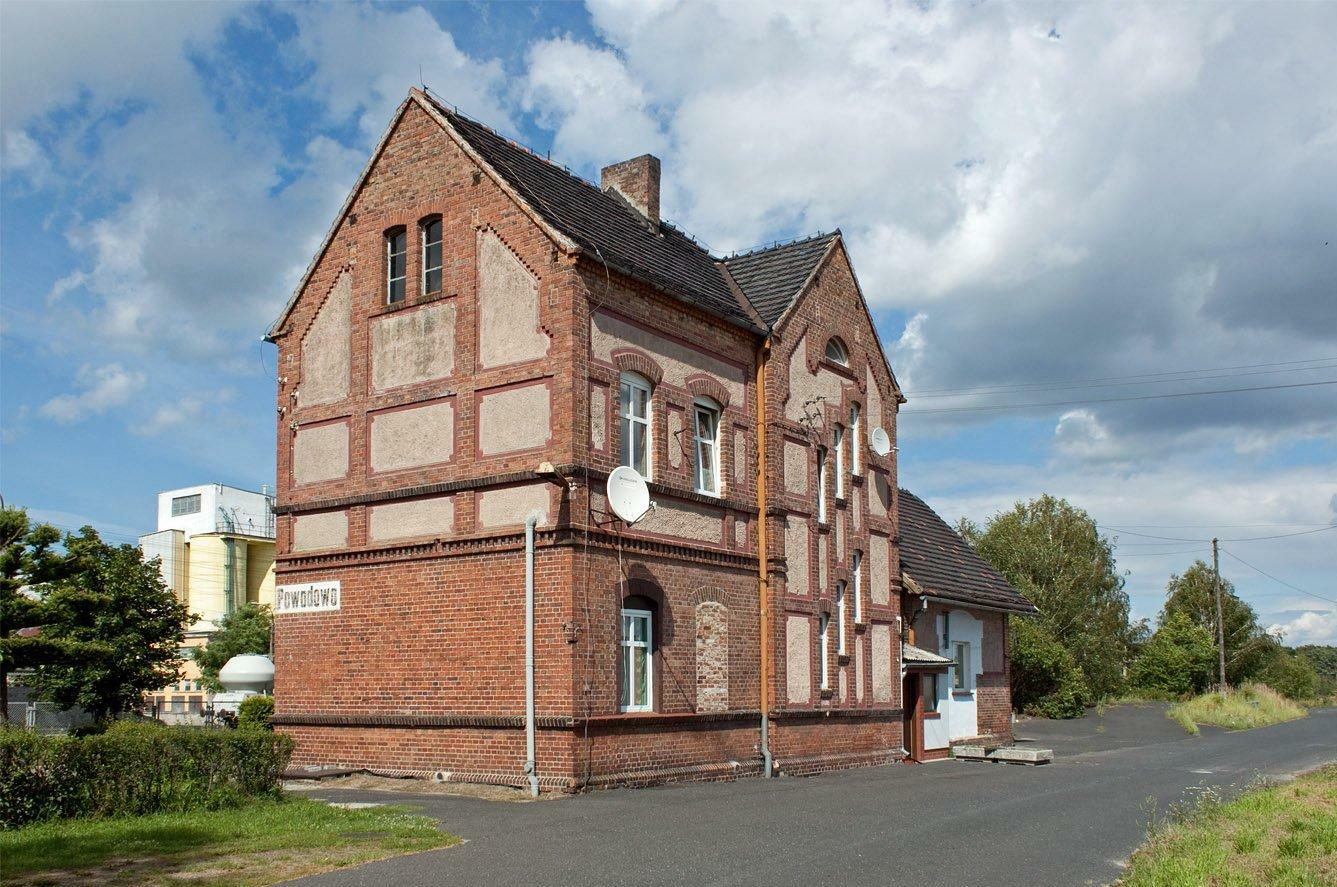
Former station building at the Powodowo railway stop near Wolsztyn

Powodowo [pɔvɔˈdɔvɔ] is a village in the administrative district of Gmina Wolsztyn, within Wolsztyn County, Greater Poland Voivodeship, in west-central Poland.
