= Eryk Kurnatowski =

Polish politician

His Excellency Hrabia Eryk Kurnatowski

Member of the Senate
- In office 1922–1927

Personal details
- Born: Eryk Kurnatowski; 8 October 1883 Brudzew, Poland
- Died: 23 February 1975 (aged 91) Warsaw, Poland
- Resting place: Powązki Cemetery
- Party: Christian Union of National Unity
- Spouse(s): Elżbieta Maria Zamoyska (1918–1942); Helena Ogończyk-Żółtowska (1942–1998)
- Education: Faculté Universitaire des Sciences Agronomiques de Gembloux (PhD)

Hrabia Eryk Kurnatowski (8 October 1883 – 23 February 1975) was a Polish nobleman and politician who served a Member of the Senate from 1922 to 1927. Brought up in an old Calvinist noble family, he converted to Catholicism later in life.

== Family ==
Eryk was a second son of Edmund Kurnatowski (1849-1903) and Wanda née Zielińska (1858-1923). He was brought up in an old calvinist aristocratic Kurnatowski family. Both his father and older brother are buried on the Evangelical Reformed Cemetery in Warsaw. Conversion to Catholicism probably happened before his first marriage.

In 1918 Eryk married Izabella Zamoyska (1885-1940), proprietress of Jadów, with whom he had two daughters. In 1942 he married Helena Żółtowska (1911-1998).

Eryk is buried in family tomb of his second wife on the Powązki Cemetery.
