= Rudno, Greater Poland Voivodeship =

Rudno
- Village
- Location within Poland
- Coordinates: 52°0′22″N 15°59′11″E
- Country: Poland
- Voivodeship: Greater Poland
- County: Wolsztyn
- Gmina: Wolsztyn
- Population: 33

Rudno [ˈrudnɔ] is a village in the administrative district of Gmina Wolsztyn, within Wolsztyn County, Greater Poland Voivodeship, in west-central Poland.
