= Chobienice =

- Village
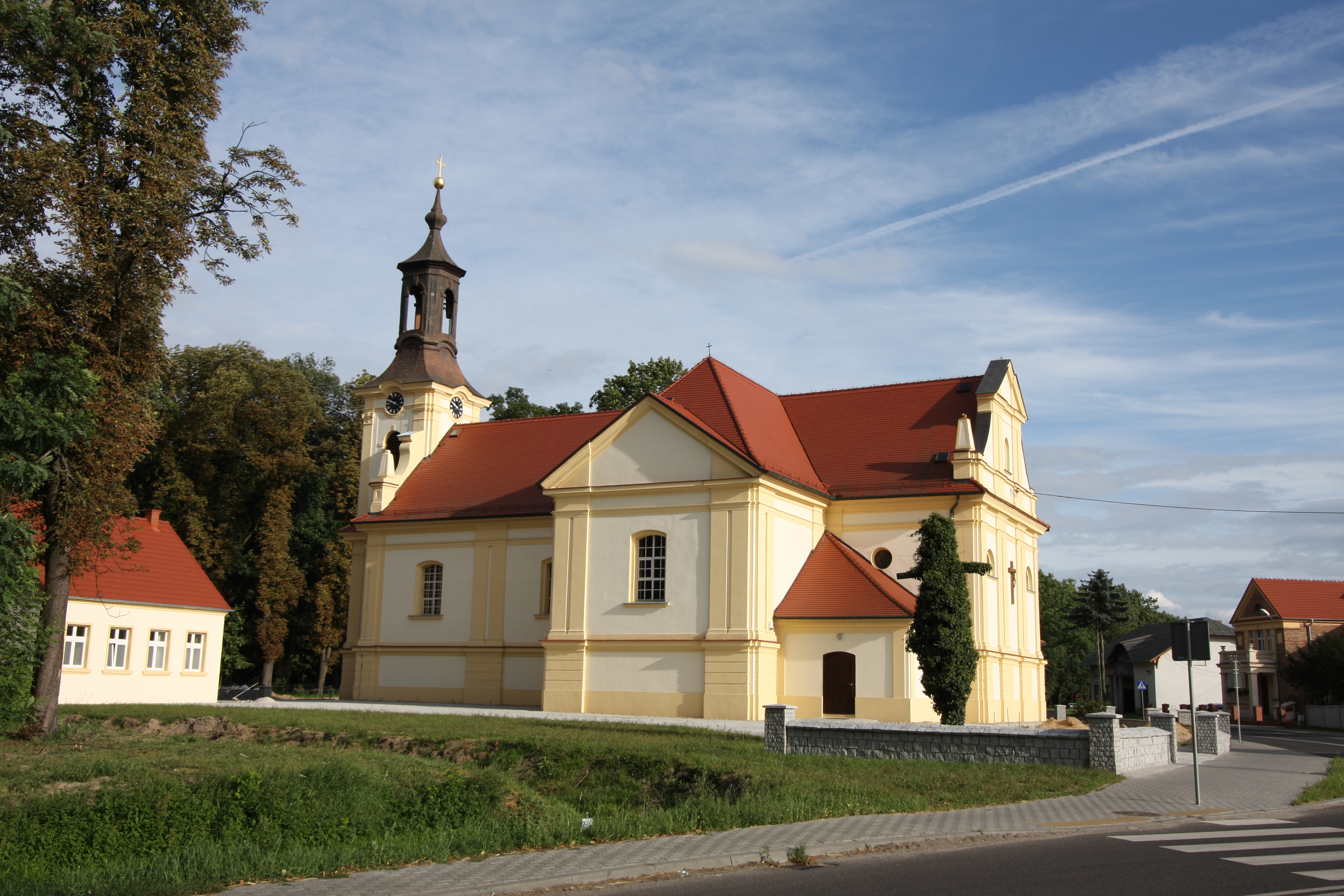
- Church in Chobienice

- Location within Poland
- Coordinates: 52°10′N 15°56′E
- Country: Poland
- Voivodeship: Greater Poland
- County: Wolsztyn
- Gmina: Siedlec
- First mentioned: 1394
- Population (2021): 1,271
- Postal code: 64-214
- Area code: +48 68
- Vehicle registration: PWL

Chobienice, [xɔbjɛˈnit͡sɛ] historically Chobienica, (German: Köbnitz) is a village in the administrative district of Gmina Siedlec, within Wolsztyn County, Greater Poland Voivodeship, in west-central Poland.

== History ==
Historically, the village belonged to Greater Poland, under many different names. (Note: By year, the village was mentioned as: 1394 - Chobenicz; 1397 - Chobenicza; 1398 - Chobenicze; 1403 - Chobnicz; 1403 - Chovenicze; 1404 - Chovenicza; 1405 - Chobenica; 1426 - Chobyenicze; 1440 - Chobyenicza; 1445 - Duplex Chobyenicze; Under German administration the name of the village was Köbnitz, which was used until the end of World War II.) The village was first mentioned in 1394 as Chobenicz. However, the area which the village is located in was settled earlier. Archaeologists discovered a hillfort 1.5 km (0.93 mi) east of the village, which is believed to date back from the 7th to mid-13th centuries.

In 1837, the village had a total population of 589, across 49 households.

== Gallery ==
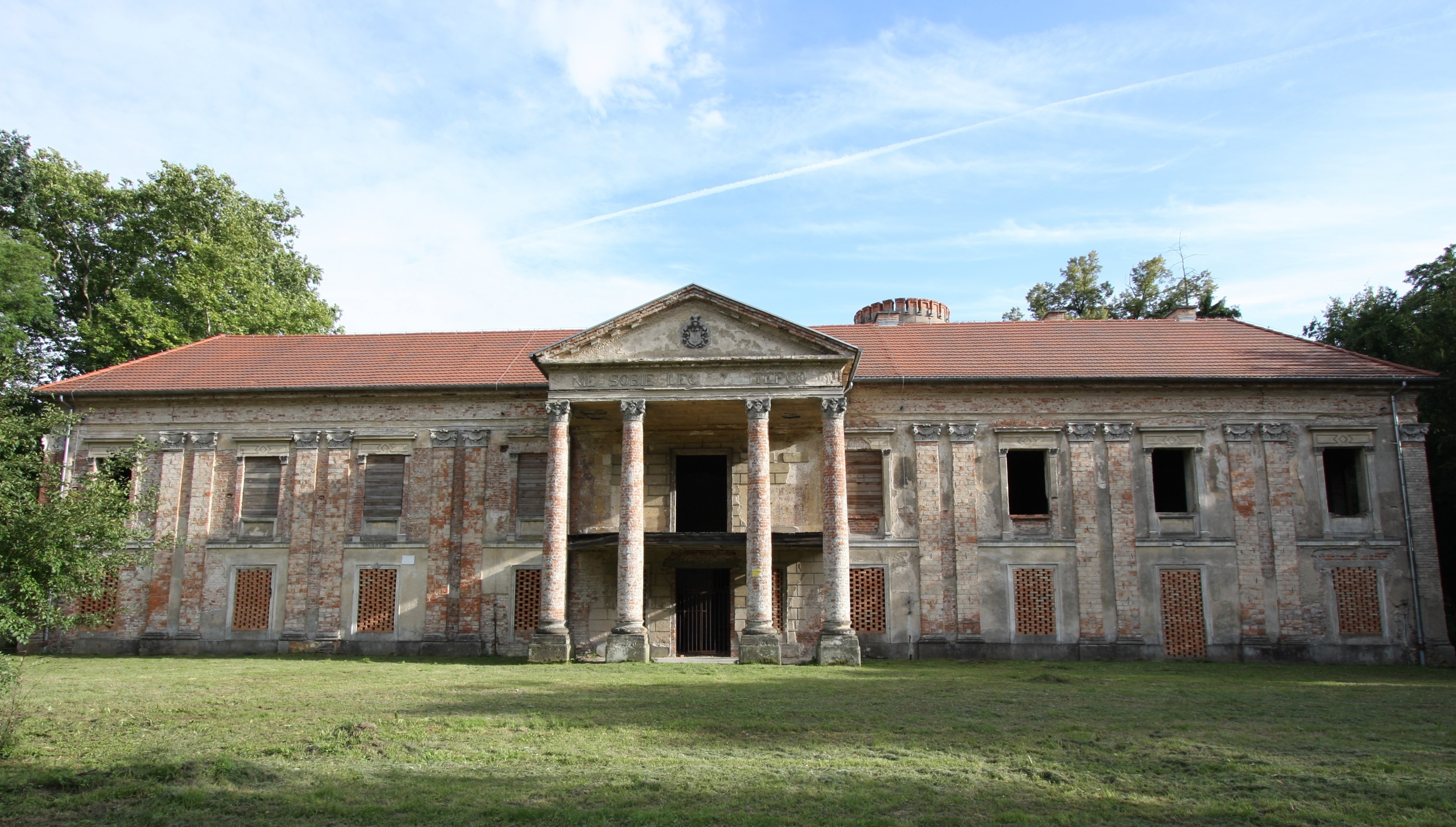
Palace of Chobienice

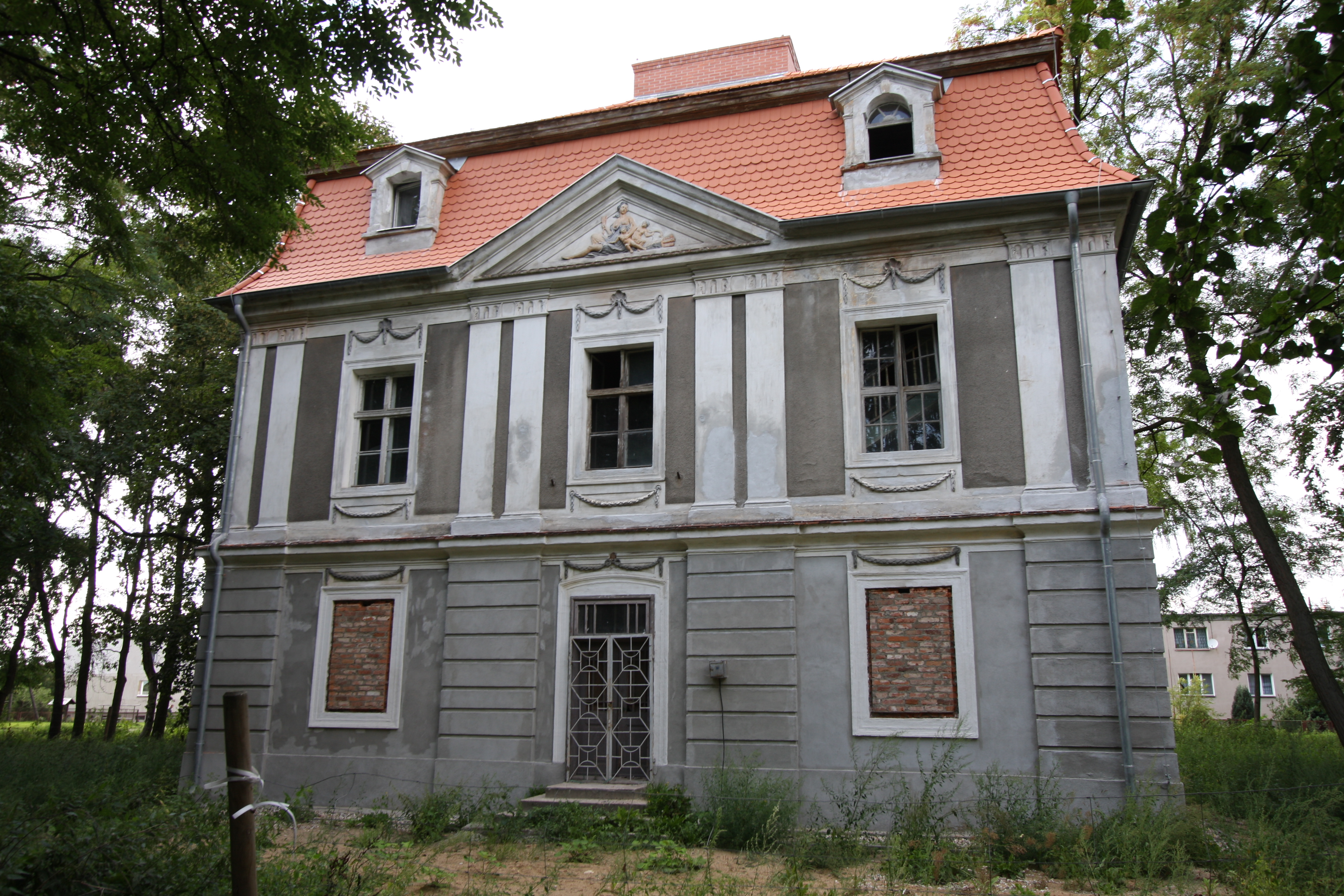
Part of the palace complex

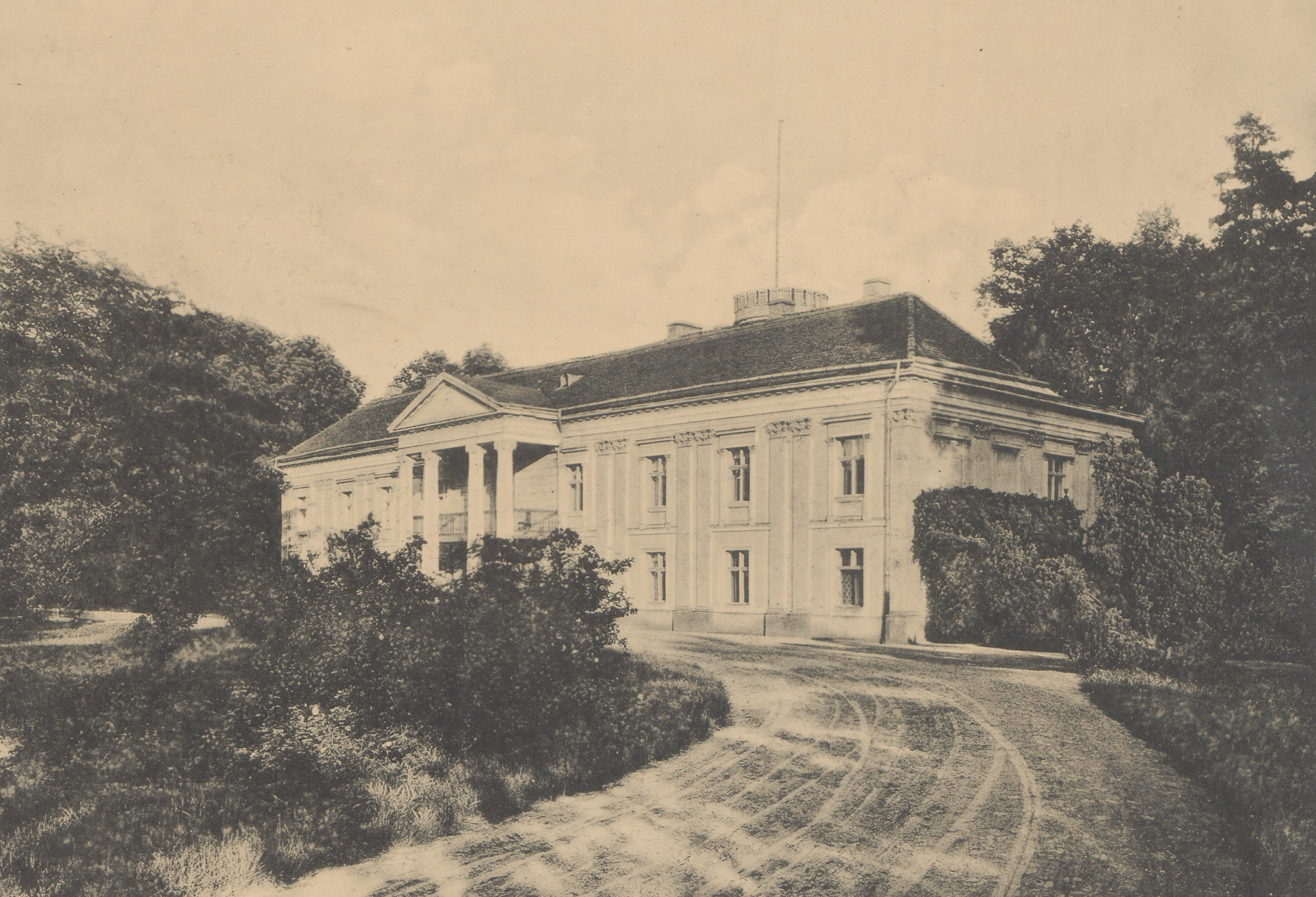
Palace of Chobienice in 1912

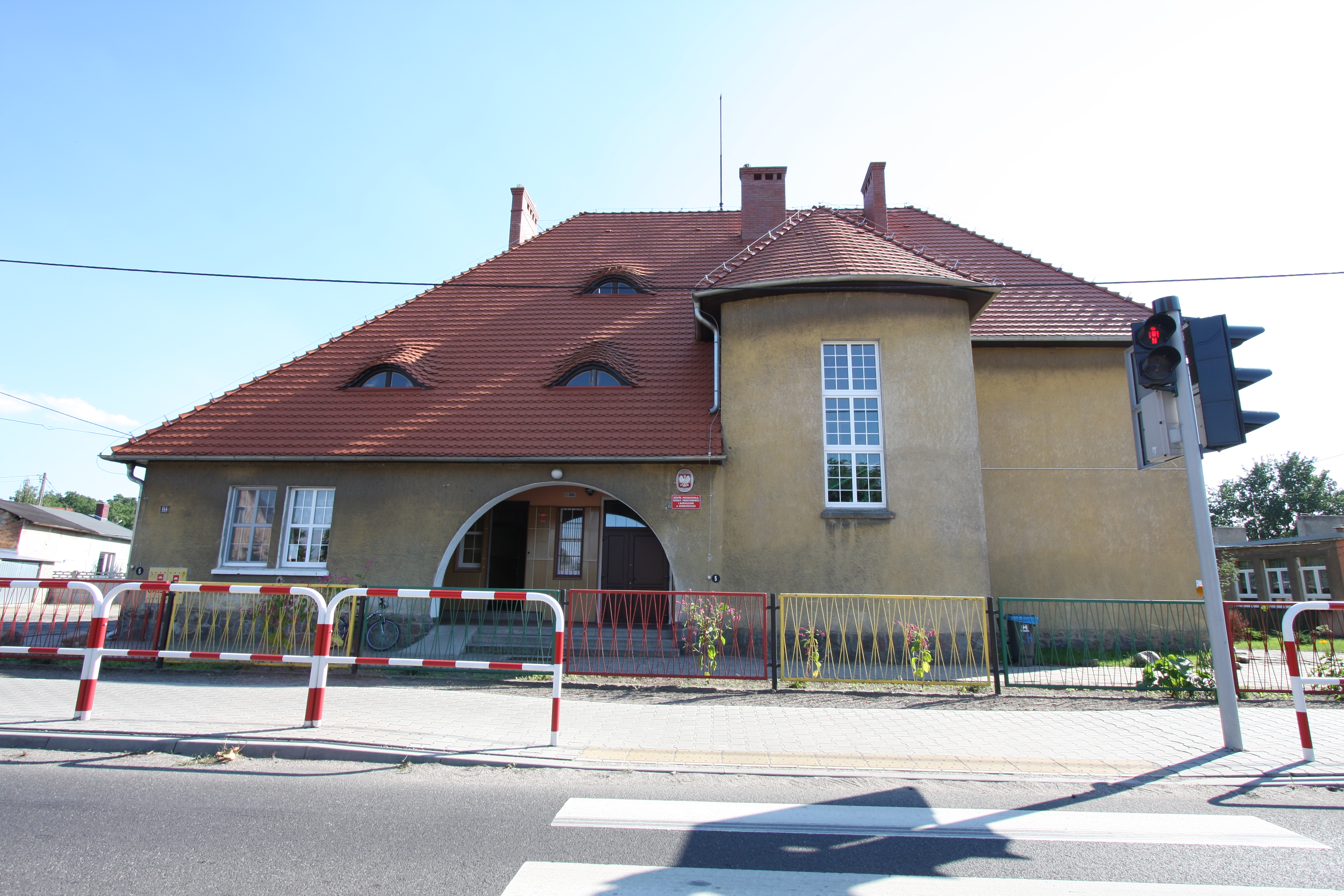
School

== Notable residents ==
- Ignacy Mielżyński (19 February 1871 – 11 January 1938), Lieutenant Colonel (Podpolkovnik) of the Polish Army cavalry
- Maciej Ignacy Mielżyński (13 October 13, 1869–9 January 1944), Lieutenant Colonel (Podpolkovnik) of the Polish Army cavalry. Commander of the Third Silesian Uprising.
