= Gmina Wolsztyn =

Gmina Wolsztyn Wolsztyn Commune
- Gmina
- Flag Coat of arms
- Interactive map of Gmina Wolsztyn
- Coordinates (Wolsztyn): 52°7′N 16°7′E
- Country: Poland
- Voivodeship: Greater Poland
- County: Wolsztyn
- Seat: Wolsztyn

Area
  - Total: 249.64 km^{2} (96.39 sq mi)

Population (2011)
  - Total: 30,330
  - Density: 121.5/km^{2} (314.7/sq mi)
  - Urban: 13,722
  - Rural: 16,608
- Website: www.wolsztyn.pl

Gmina Wolsztyn is an urban-rural gmina (administrative district) in Wolsztyn County, Greater Poland Voivodeship, in west-central Poland. Its seat is the town of Wolsztyn, which lies approximately 63 kilometres (39 mi) south-west of the regional capital Poznań.

The gmina covers an area of 249.64 square kilometres (96.4 sq mi), and as of 2006 its total population is 29,216 (out of which the population of Wolsztyn amounts to 13,557, and the population of the rural part of the gmina is 15,659).

== Villages ==
Apart from the town of Wolsztyn, Gmina Wolsztyn contains the villages and settlements of Adamowo, Barłożnia Gościeszyńska, Berzyna, Błocko, Chorzemin, Gościeszyn, Karpicko, Kębłowo, Krutla, Niałek Wielki, Nowa Dąbrowa, Nowa Obra, Nowe Tłoki, Nowy Widzim, Obra, Powodowo, Rudno, Stara Dąbrowa, Stary Widzim, Stradyń, Świętno, Tłoki, Wilcze and Wroniawy.

== Neighbouring gminas ==
Gmina Wolsztyn is bordered by the gminas of Kargowa, Kolsko, Przemęt, Rakoniewice, Siedlec and Sława.
