= Maria Kurnatowska =

Polish politician (1945–2009)

Member of Sejm
- In office 1993–1997

Member of Kuyavian-Pomeranian Regional Assembly
- In office 1999–2009

Personal details
- Born: July 2, 1945 Strzelno, Poland
- Died: March 27, 2009 (aged 63) Bydgoszcz, Poland
- Party: Polish People's Party

Maria Elżbiera Kurnatowska (2 July 1945 – 27 March 2009) was a Polish politician who served as a Member of Sejm from 1993 to 1997 and as a Member of Kuyavian-Pomeranian Regional Assembly from 1999 to 2009.

== Early life and education ==
Maria Elżbiera Kurnatowska was born on 2 July 1945 in Strzelno, Poland. In 1970, she studied history at Adam Mickiewicz University in Poznań. After graduation, she was a professor of history for many years. History and education remained themes around which focused during her political career.

== Political career ==
Between 1990 and 1998 Kurnatowska was a delegate and Vice-Marschal of Bydgoszcz Regional Assembly. In 1993 parliamentary election she was elected to Sejm of Poland (lower house of Polish parliament) as member of Sejm III term to 1997. In 1998 local elections she was elected to Kuyavian-Pomeranian Regional Assembly I term and served her seat by three terms to her death in 2009. She was a member of Voivodeship executive board (zarząd województwa) between 1999 and 2006.

== Awards and honors ==
She received:
Golden Cross of Merit in 1999.
