= Kotowo, Gmina Granowo =

Kotowo
- Village
- Location within Poland
- Coordinates: 52°13′N 16°29′E
- Country: Poland
- Voivodeship: Greater Poland
- County: Grodzisk
- Gmina: Granowo

Kotowo [kɔˈtɔvɔ] is a village in the administrative district of Gmina Granowo, within Grodzisk County, Greater Poland Voivodeship, in west-central Poland.
