= Marianowo, Międzychód County =

Marianowo
- Village
- Location within Poland
- Coordinates: 52°40′N 16°4′E
- Country: Poland
- Voivodeship: Greater Poland
- County: Międzychód
- Gmina: Sieraków

Marianowo [marjaˈnɔvɔ] is a village in the administrative district of Gmina Sieraków, within Międzychód County, Greater Poland Voivodeship, in west-central Poland.
