= Noble titles in Poland =

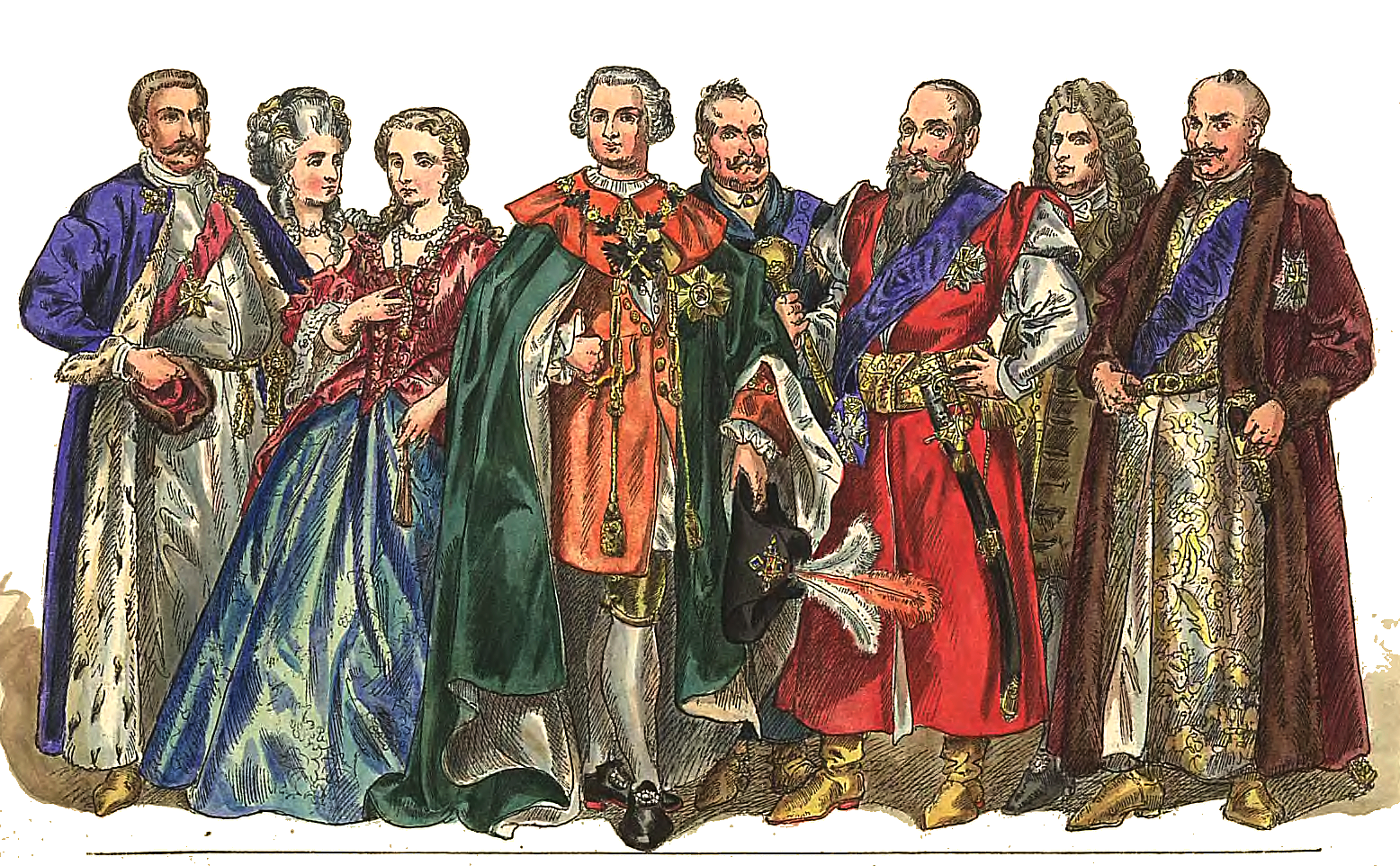
Attire of Polish magnates, 1697-1795

The hierarchy of noble titles in Poland was relatively uncommon throughout most of its history. Polish nobility szlachta enjoyed the principle of political equality of all its members. For this reason the idea of introducing the noble / aristocratic titles was strongly opposed, with a number of exceptions.

== Polish-Lithuanian Commonwealth ==
After Polish–Lithuanian unions, aristocratic titles of the Lithuanian nobility and Ruthenian nobility (Polish: kniaź, Ruthenian: knyaz, Lithuanian: kunigaikštis) were preserved.

The title książę was used to translate foreign titles of prince or duke.

Polish magnates readily accepted the foreign aristocratic titles.

The title hrabia was matching to that of count. The title was adopted from Czech, in which itself is a loanword from the Old German title grāve (cf. modern German Graf). Polish kings had the privilege to grant the title of hrabia, but they did this mostly for foreign nationals, as well as for Lithuanian and Ruthenian aristocrats. Examples of the latter are Chodkiewicz and Tyszkiewicz family.

The monarchs of the House of Habsburg as Holy Roman Emperors gave out the titles of counts and dukes Sacri Imperii Romani. In Poland, this title was rendered as hrabia cesarstwa rzymskiego ("Count of the Roman Empire").

Just before the fall of the Commonwealth, the Polish sejm, against tradition, started giving out aristocratic titles, e.g., to Poniatowskis (1764) and a line of Ponińskis (1773, for Adam Karol książe Poniński, Marshal of the Sejm).

After the Partitions, the junior branch of Poninskis in Galicia (Eastern Europe) received the title of książę (Prinz) from Austria with the coat of arms Poniński (herb książęcy), while the elder branch received the title of hrabia (Graf) from Prussia with the coat of arms Poniński Hrabia.

Polish–Lithuanian Tatars used the title mirza. They were also given Polish-style titles of książę or hrabia.

== Modern Poland ==
The 1921 March Constitution of Poland abolished all noble titles. However, the April Constitution of Poland abolished the March one, hence formally the legality of titles was restored. The interim Small Constitution of 1947 partially reverted to the March one, abolishing the titles again. The subsequent constitutions, both of Communist Poland and the modern one, say nothing of the titles. Therefore legally they remain abolished. However eurodeputy Róża Thun styles herself as Róża Maria Barbara Gräfin von Thun und Hohenstein in official documents ("Gräfin" is German for "countess").

According to the Polish Nobility Association, there are quite a few "fraternities" and other organizations which endow their members with noble titles, preying on the ignorant, vain and ambitious.

== See also ==
- List of Polish titled nobility
  - Princely houses of Poland and Lithuania
  - List of Polish noble families with the title of Count
  - List of Polish noble families with the title of Marquess
  - List of Polish noble families with the title of Baron
- Polish princely families
