= Wolsztyn County =

Wolsztyn County Powiat wolsztyński
- County
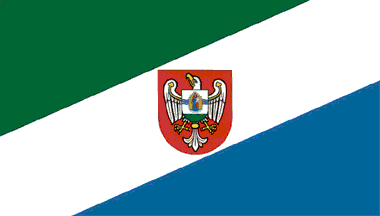
- Flag Coat of arms

- Location within the voivodeship
- Coordinates (Wolsztyn): 52°7′N 16°7′E
- Country: Poland
- Voivodeship: Greater Poland
- Seat: Wolsztyn
- Gminas: Total 3: Gmina Przemęt; Gmina Siedlec; Gmina Wolsztyn

Area
  - Total: 680.03 km^{2} (262.56 sq mi)

Population (2006)
  - Total: 54,718
  - Density: 80.464/km^{2} (208.40/sq mi)
  - Urban: 13,557
  - Rural: 41,161
- Car plates: PWL
- Website: http://www.powiatwolsztyn.pl

Wolsztyn County (Polish: powiat wolsztyński) is a unit of territorial administration and local government (powiat) in Greater Poland Voivodeship, west-central Poland. It came into being on January 1, 1999, as a result of the Polish local government reforms passed in 1998. Its administrative seat and only town is Wolsztyn, which lies 63 kilometres (39 mi) south-west of the regional capital Poznań.

The county covers an area of 680.03 square kilometres (262.6 sq mi). As of 2006 its total population is 54,718, out of which the population of Wolsztyn is 13,557 and the rural population is 41,161.

== Neighbouring counties ==
Wolsztyn County is bordered by Nowy Tomyśl County to the north, Grodzisk County to the north-east, Kościan County to the east, Leszno County to the south-east, Wschowa County to the south, Nowa Sól County to the south-west and Zielona Góra County to the west.

== Administrative divisions ==
The county is subdivided into three gminas (one urban-rural and two rural). These are listed in the following table, in descending order of population.

Gmina	Type	Area (km^{2})	Population (2006)	Seat
Gmina Wolsztyn	urban-rural	249.6	29,216	Wolsztyn
Gmina Przemęt	rural	225.3	13,494	Przemęt
Gmina Siedlec	rural	205.1	12,008	Siedlec

== Economy ==
At the end of September 2019, the number of registered unemployed in the Wolsztyn district amounted to approximately 0.4 thousand inhabitants, which is unemployment rate at the level of 1.5% of the active population.
