= List of windmills in Poland =

This is a list of windmills in Poland.

== Greater Poland Voivodeship ==
Location	Name of mill	Type	Built	Notes	Photograph
Brenno		Post			
Dębe		Post		Windmill World	
Dziekanowice (Wielkopolski Park Etnograficzny)		Post		from Mierzewo, Wielkopolski Park Etnograficzny	
Dziekanowice (Wielkopolski Park Etnograficzny)		Post		from Gryżyna	
Dziekanowice (Wielkopolski Park Etnograficzny)		Tower	replica	from Trzuskołoń	
Jerka		Post			
Kawczyn	Wojciech	Post	1805	commons	
Kościan		Post		Windmill World	
Krzywiń		post			
Lednogóra		Post			
Lednogóra		Post			
Lednogóra		Post			
Osieczna	(three mills)	Post			
Pępowo		Post			
Pysząca		Post			
Rogierówko		Tower			
Rybitwy		Post			
Rydzyna	Józef	Post	1983 (reconstructed)		
Siekowo		Post	1877		
Śmigiel	(two mills)	Post		Windmill World	
Święciechowa		Post			
Wilczyn		Post			
Wolsztyn	Wolsztyn Regional Museum	Post	1998		

== Kuyavian-Pomeranian Voivodeship ==
Location	Name of mill	Type	Built	Notes	Photograph
Bierzgłowo		Post	end of 19th century	reconstructed in 2011	
Kłóbka		Post	1870	Windmill World	
Młyny		Tower			
Toruń, Ethnographic park		Tower	1896	moved from the village Wójtówka	

== Łódź Voivodeship ==
Location	Name of mill	Type	Built	Notes	Photograph
Chrosno		Post			
Gąszcze		Post			
Grotowice		Post	19th century	Moved to Opole; Windmill World	
Wroniawy		Post	1902	Moved to Wolsztyn in 1998	

== Lower Silesian Voivodeship ==
Location	Name of mill	Type	Built	Notes	Photograph
Głogów		Tower			
Jerzmanowice		Smock		Converted to restaurant Windmill World	
Polkowice		Tower			
Zagórzyce				Destroyed in 1945	

== Lublin Voivodeship ==
Location	Name of mill	Type	Built	Notes	Photograph
Hola (Lublin Countryside Museum)		Post		from Wołoskowola	
Koziol		Post		Trestle only remains.	
Mięćmierz)		Post		Windmill World	
Lublin (Lublin Countryside Museum)	wiatrak z Zygmuntowa	tower	1918	from Zygmuntów	

== Lubusz Voivodeship ==
Location	Name of mill	Type	Built	Notes	Photograph
Leśniów Wielki		Post			
Nowa Wieś		Post			
Sława Śląska		Post	1633	Moved to Wroniawy in 1902.	

== Masovian Voivodeship ==
Location	Name of mill	Type	Built	Notes	Photograph
Grzmucin		Post		Moved to Tokarnia	
Kleszewo			19th century	Windmill World	
Lipniki		Post			

== Opole Voivodeship ==
Location	Name of mill	Type	Built	Notes	Photograph
Lednica		Post		Windmill World	
Opole		Post		Windmill World	
Opole		Post	1734	Windmill World	

== Podlaskie Voivodeship ==
Location	Name of mill	Type	Built	Notes	Photograph
Ciechanowiec		Hollow post		Windmill World	
Czarna Białostocka		Post		Windmill World	
Malawicze Górne		Post		Windmill World	
Nowogród		Post			
Słoneczny Stok				Windmill World	
Tykocin		post			

== Pomeranian Voivodeship ==
Location	Name of mill	Type	Built	Notes	Photograph
Budzisz		Tower			
Palczewo		Smock		Windmills in Palczewo	
Wdzydze Kiszewskie		Smock			
Wdzydze Kiszewskie		Post		Windmill World	
Żuławy		Smock		Windmill World	

== Silesian Voivodeship ==
Location	Name of mill	Type	Built	Notes	Photograph
Chorzów		Post	1813	Windmill World	
Rudy		Post	1934	Windmill World	

== Subcarpathian Voivodeship ==
Location	Name of mill	Type	Built	Notes	Photograph
Domaradz		Post		Moved to Sanok	
Markowa		Post		Windmill World	
Padew Narodowa		Smock		Windmill World	
Sanok	Muzeum Budownictwa Ludowego w Sanoku				
Sanok	Muzeum Budownictwa Ludowego w Sanoku	Post			
Sanok	Muzeum Budownictwa Ludowego w Sanoku	Post			
Trzciana		Post	1889		
Trzęsówka		Post		Windmill World	
Urzejowice		Post		Moved to Sanok	
Zarębki	(Three mills)	Post		Windmill World	
(near) Żarówka		Post		Windmill World	
Zarównie		Smock		Windmill World	

== Świętokrzyskie Voivodeship ==
Location	Name of mill	Type	Built	Notes	Photograph
Szwarszowice		Tower	1885	commons,	
Tokarnia (Kielce Countryside Museum)	wiatrak z Grzmucina	Post	1921	from Grzmucin commons,	
Tokarnia (Kielce Countryside Museum)	wiatrak z Janika	Post	1861	from Janik commons,	
Tokarnia (Kielce Countryside Museum)	wiatrak z Grzymałkowa	Tower (wooden)	1931	from Grzymałków	
Tokarnia (Kielce Countryside Museum)	wiatrak z Dębna	Post	1880	from Dębno	
Tokarnia (Kielce Countryside Museum)	wiatrak z Pacanowa	Tower (wooden)	1913	from Pacanów	

== Warmian-Masurian Voivodeship ==
Location	Name of mill	Type	Built	Notes	Photograph
Ełk		Smock		Windmill World	
Łęcze		Tower			
Olsztynek		Smock		Windmill World	
Ryn		Tower	1873	Windmill World	
Stara Różanka		Tower		Windmill World	
Sterławki Małe			19th century	Windmill World	

== West Pomeranian Voivodeship ==
Location	Name of mill	Type	Built	Notes	Photograph
Kłęby		Tower			
Lędzin		Tower		Converted to holiday accommodation. Windmill World	
Stepnica		Post			
Szczecin		Tower			

== Notes ==
Known building dates are in bold text. Non-bold text denotes first known date.
