= Solec (disambiguation) =

Solec may refer to numerous places in Poland:

- Solec, Warsaw, a neighbourhood in Śródmieście, Warsaw
- Solec, Łódź Voivodeship (central Poland)
- Solec, Gostynin County in Masovian Voivodeship (central Poland)
- Solec, Piaseczno County in Masovian Voivodeship (east-central Poland)
- Solec, Gmina Krzykosy, Środa County in Greater Poland Voivodeship (west-central Poland)
- Solec, Wolsztyn County in Greater Poland Voivodeship (west Poland)
- Solec, Opole Voivodeship (south Poland)
- Solec Kujawski, a town in Kuyavian-Pomeranian Voivodeship (north-central Poland)
- Solec Kujawski Commune, a gmina (administrative district) in Kuyavian-Pomeranian Voivodeship (north-central Poland)
- Solec nad Wisłą, a village on the Vistula river in Masovian Voivodeship (east-central Poland)
- Solec Nowy, a village in Greater Poland Voivodeship (west-central Poland)
