= Radomierz =

Radomierz may refer to the following places in Poland:

- Radomierz, Lower Silesian Voivodeship (south-west Poland)
- Radomierz, Greater Poland Voivodeship (west-central Poland)
