= 1991 in the environment =

This is a list of notable events relating to the environment in 1991. They relate to environmental law, conservation, environmentalism and environmental issues.

== Events ==
- The New Zealand Forest Accord between forestry associations and environmental groups is signed.
- The Rotvoll protests arose in Norway opposing the construction of a research and development facility for Statoil (today Equinor).
- A number of a protected areas were created, including Przemęt Landscape Park) in western Poland.

=== January ===
- The Gulf War oil spill began. It is one of the largest oil spills in history and resulted from the Gulf War in 1991 causing considerable damage to wildlife in the Persian Gulf, especially in areas surrounding Kuwait and Iraq.
- The Kuwaiti oil fires began and were caused by Iraqi military forces setting fire to more than 600 oil wells as part of a scorched earth policy while retreating from Kuwait, causing "An environmental disaster".

=== February ===
- The Protocol to the 1979 Convention on Long-Range Transboundary Air Pollution Concerning the Control of Emissions of Nitrogen Oxides or Their Transboundary Fluxes (Nitrogen Oxide Protocol) came into force.

=== March ===
- The Air Quality Agreement, an environmental treaty between Canada and the United States, was signed by Canadian Prime Minister Brian Mulroney and American President George H. W. Bush. It entered into force immediately.

=== June ===
- The first EU-organic production-regulation was enacted on 24 June 1991.

=== July ===
- The Resource Management Act 1991 (RMA) passed into law in New Zealand. It is a significant, and at times, controversial Act of Parliament. The RMA promotes the sustainable management of natural and physical resources such as land, air and water.

=== October ===
- The Agreement on the Conservation of Seals in the Wadden Sea enters into force.

== See also ==
- Human impact on the environment
- List of environmental issues
- List of years in the environment
