= San Pedro Department =

San Pedro Department may refer to:

In Argentina

- San Pedro Department, Jujuy
- San Pedro Department, Misiones

In Ivory Coast

- San-Pédro Department

In Paraguay

- San Pedro Department, Paraguay
