= Olejnica =

- Village
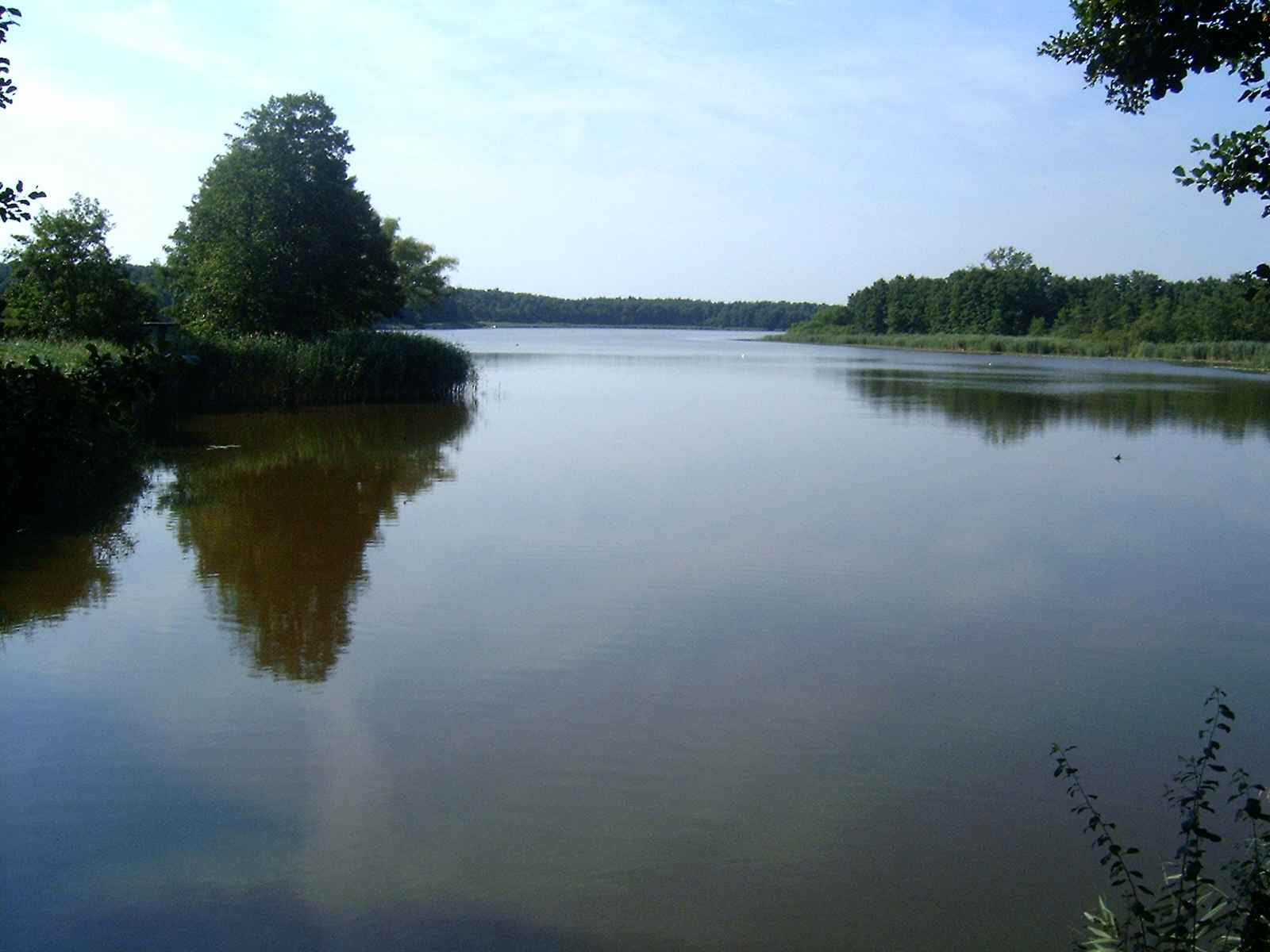

- Location within Poland
- Coordinates: 51°58′N 16°15′E
- Country: Poland
- Voivodeship: Greater Poland
- County: Wolsztyn
- Gmina: Przemęt
- Population: 56
- Time zone: UTC+1 (CET)
  - Summer (DST): UTC+2 (CEST)
- Vehicle registration: PWL

Olejnica [ɔlɛi̯ˈnit͡sa] is a village in the administrative district of Gmina Przemęt, within Wolsztyn County, Greater Poland Voivodeship, in west-central Poland.

== History ==
In the past, Olejnica was a private church village of the monastery in Przemęt. Around 1845, it had a population of 55.

Olejnica was often visited in the 1980s by Polish writers Wisława Szymborska and Kornel Filipowicz. Szymborska wrote about the village in her poem Pożegnanie z widokiem.
