= Sokołowice =

Sokołowice may refer to the following places in Poland:

- Sokołowice, Lower Silesian Voivodeship (south-west Poland)
- Sokołowice, Lesser Poland Voivodeship (south Poland)
- Sokołowice, Greater Poland Voivodeship (west-central Poland)
