= Robert Lehmann-Nitsche =

German anthropologist

Roberto Lehmann-Nitsche
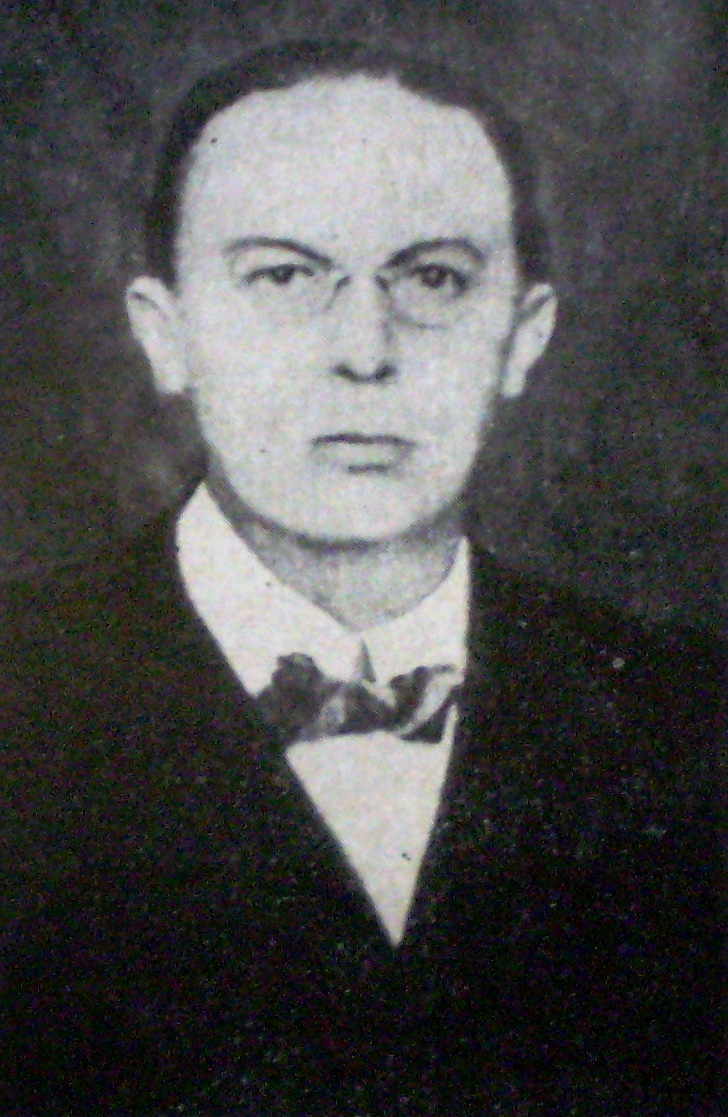
- Roberto Lehmann-Nitsche
- Born: November 9, 1872; Radomierz, Province of Posen, Kingdom of Prussia, German Empire
- Died: March 9, 1938 (aged 65); Berlin, German Empire
- Citizenship: German Empire
- Occupation: anthropologist

Academic work
- Discipline: Anthropologist peoples of South America

Robert Lehmann‑Nitsche (November 9, 1872, in Radomierz – April 9, 1938, in Berlin) was a German anthropologist who spent thirty years in Argentina as director of the Anthropological Section of the La Plata Museum and professor at the University of Buenos Aires. He became an authority on indigenous peoples in Argentina and concluded his academic career at the Friedrich Wilhelm University of Berlin. After his death, he was accused of racism and having used research methods disrespectful of the rights of native Argentines.

== Biography ==
Lehmann‑Nitsche was born in what was then called Radomitz in a well-off family of farmers. He studied at the University of Freiburg and at the Friedrich Wilhelm University of Berlin, and earned his doctorate in Philosophy in 1894 at the Ludwig-Maximilians-Universität München (LMU). In the same university, he earned a second doctorate, in Medicine, in 1897. In the same year 1897, he moved to Buenos Aires, having accepted an offer to direct the Anthropological Section of the La Plata Museum. His predecessor, Dutch anthropologist Herman Frederik Carel ten Kate, had recommended him for the position because of Lehmann-Nitsche's discussion of Osteology in his two doctoral dissertations. Ten Kate recommended to the young German scholar to carry out an extensive osteological study of the native Argentines, comparing them to other native populations of the Americas, Africa, and Oceania, based on the large collection of skulls owned by the La Plata Museum.

Lehmann-Nitsche did perform the recommended study, but extended it to living individuals from the indigenous people of Argentina. He started in 1898-1900 by examining individuals from the Selkʼnam people who had been abducted in Patagonia and were exhibited by circuses or in events such as Buenos Aires' National Industrial Exposition of 1898. However, he soon concluded that observations of native Argentines living free in their villages was more valuable, and between 1902 and 1925 organized six expeditions to remote areas of Argentina, putting together a rich collection of photographs, artifacts, and songs recorded on phonograph cylinders. He also used German immigrants in Argentina as informants and correspondents, and they continued to send new materials to the museum.

He found the phonograph cylinders technique particularly useful to document vanishing forms of Argentine music. In 1905, Lehmann-Nitsche recorded extensively music from the Tehuelche people, but he went on in the following years recording several dozens of Argentine folk singers specialized in Tango. In 1906, he signed an agreement with the British industrialists Walter (1858-1944) and William Leach (1851-1932), who owned a sugar factory in La Esperanza, Jujuy. He had noted that workers there came from several different ethnic groups and used to sing while working. Lehmann-Nitsche recorded their songs in 30 phonograph cylinders that, like the better part of his recordings, he sent to the Berliner Phonogramm-Archiv.

Between 1911 and 1925, Lehmann-Nitsche embarked in an ambitious project aimed at creating a global map of the languages and religious beliefs of native Argentines, comparing the latter with mythologies of Native Americans in the United States and native populations in Peru. His main book on the subject, Studien zur südamerikanischen Mythologie, was published posthumously one year after his death, in 1939. During his explorations of Argentine folklore, he had also collected ribald songs and poetry in Argentine brothels, which he judged wise to publish in Germany in 1923 under the pseudonym of Victor Borde as El Plata Folklore.

In 1902, he started teaching a course of Anthropology at the University of Buenos Aires, which in 1905 created for him what was the first chair of Anthropology in South America. He directed a great number of dissertations and contributed to the creation of the first generation of Argentine anthropologists.

In Argentina, in the 1920s, Lehmann-Nitsche was an active member and a leader of the local foreign chapter of the conservative German National People's Party. He returned to Germany in 1930 and continued teaching Anthropology as an invited professor at his old alma mater, the Friedrich Wilhelm University. He succumbed to cancer in Berlin on April 9, 1938.

== Controversies ==
During his lifetime, Lehmann-Nitsche was accused of devoting excessive attention and the public financial resources of Argentina to preserving the culture of the indigenous people of the country. The prevailing political narrative of the time regarded such interests to be of minor significance, considering only the white population as the "real" Argentines. In more recent years, he received a very different criticism for having interviewed native Argentines who were kept and "exhibited" in circuses and other degrading settings in conditions of virtual slavery, and for exhibiting skulls and other bones of deceased natives in the La Plata Museum. The controversy has reached his photographs of indigenous people and other materials that are part of the Digital Collections at the Ibero-Amerikanisches Institut in Berlin.

Lehmann-Nitsche was denounced in a movie about the story of an abducted native girl, Damiana Kryygi (2015) by Alejandro Fernández Mouján. The subsequent scandal led the La Plata Museum to decide to give back the bones of several native Argentines to their tribes so that they could be properly buried.

== Selected works by Lehmann-Nitsche ==
- (under the pseudonym of Victor Borde) El Plata Folklore. Texte aus den La Plata-Gebieten in volkstümlichem Spanisch und Rotwelsch. Nach dem Wiener handschriftlichen Material zusammengestellt (1923). Leipzig; Ethologischer Verlag Friedrich S. Krauss.
- Studien zur südamerikanischen Mythologie : die ätiologischen Motive (1939). Hamburg: Friederichsen, de Gruyter & Co.
