= Wieleń Zaobrzański =

- Village
- Location within Poland
- Coordinates: 51°56′57″N 16°10′52″E
- Country: Poland
- Voivodeship: Greater Poland
- County: Wolsztyn
- Gmina: Przemęt
- Population: 200
- Website: http://www.wielen.up.pl

Wieleń Zaobrzański [ˈvjɛlɛɲ zaɔˈbʐaɲski] is a village in the administrative district of Gmina Przemęt, within Wolsztyn County, Greater Poland Voivodeship, in west-central Poland.
