= Błotnica, Greater Poland Voivodeship =

Błotnica
- Village
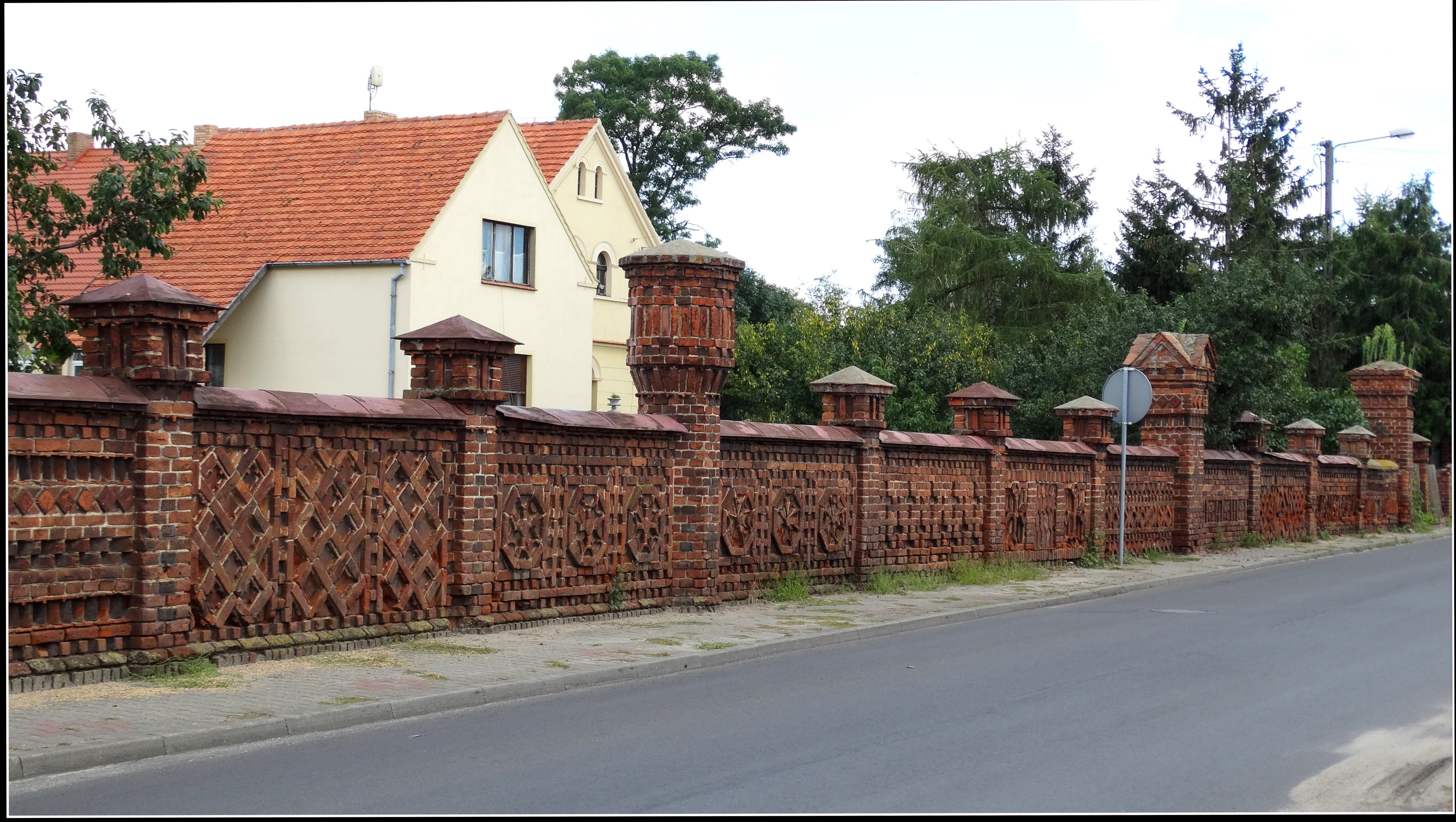

- Location within Poland
- Coordinates: 52°0′N 16°18′E
- Country: Poland
- Voivodeship: Greater Poland
- County: Wolsztyn
- Gmina: Przemęt

Błotnica [bwɔtˈnit͡sa] is a village in the administrative district of Gmina Przemęt, within Wolsztyn County, Greater Poland Voivodeship, in west-central Poland.
