= San Pedro de Jujuy =

- City
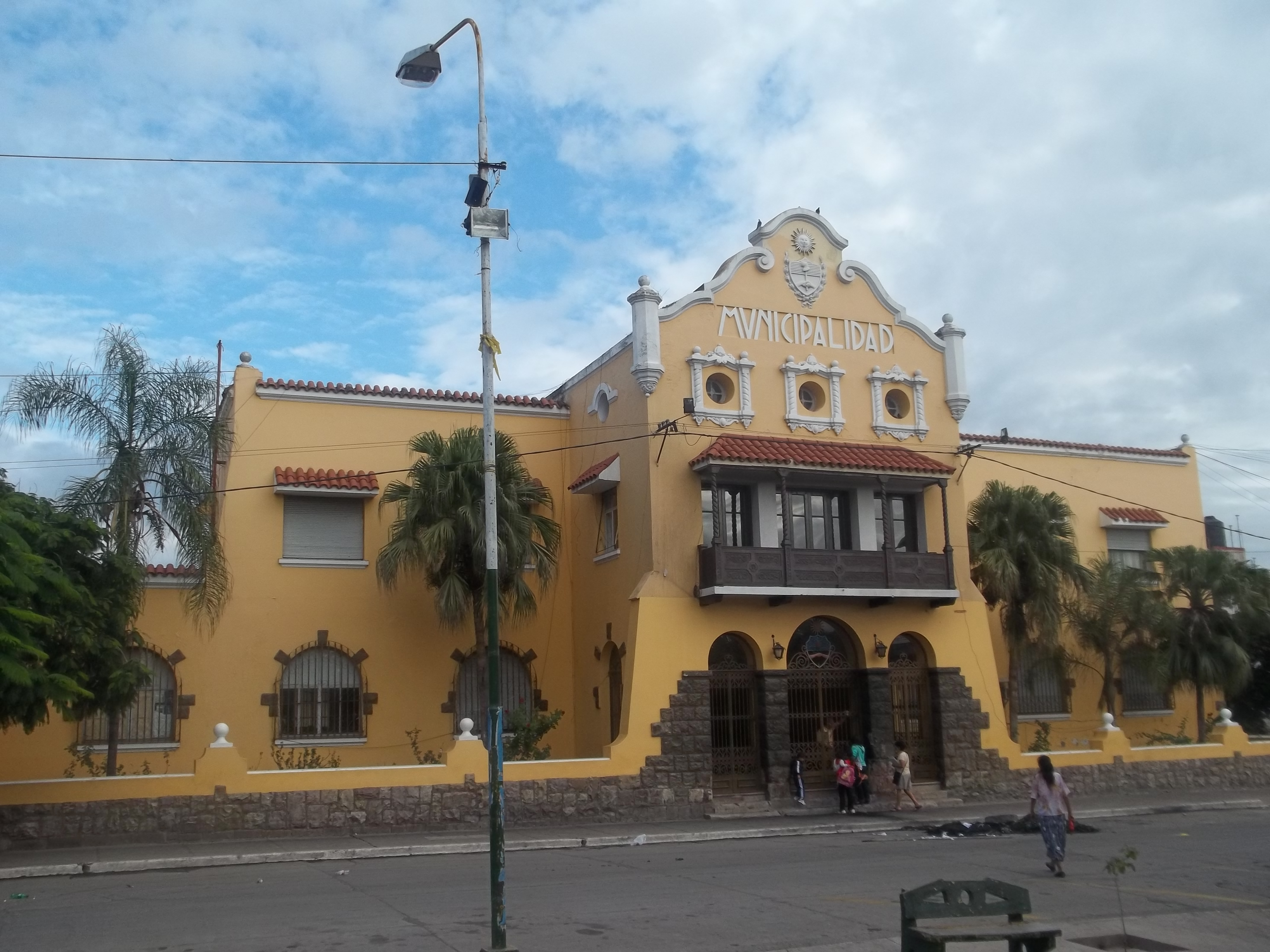

- Coat of arms

- Location of San Pedro de Jujuy in Argentina
- Coordinates: 24°14′S 64°52′W
- Country: Argentina
- Province: Jujuy
- Department: San Pedro
- Established: May 25, 1883
- Founder: Eugenio Tello

Area
  - Total: 2,150 km^{2} (830 sq mi)
- Elevation: 587 m (1,926 ft)

Population (2010 census)
  - Total: 75,037
  - Density: 34.9/km^{2} (90.4/sq mi)
- Time zone: UTC−3 (ART)
- CPA base: Y4500
- Dialing code: +54 3884

San Pedro de Jujuy is the second most populated city in the province of Jujuy, Argentina. It has 75,037 inhabitants since the 2010 census [INDEC], and is the head town of the San Pedro Department. It lies in the southeast of the province, by National Route 34, within the valley of the San Francisco River, about 45 km east of the provincial capital San Salvador de Jujuy.

The area has a humid subtropical climate that favours crops such as sugarcane and tobacco, which are the basis of the regional economy.

== Notable people ==
- Romina Tejerina – woman who gained national attention in 2003 due to a murder case which involved alleged sexual abuse against her.
