= Bucz Dębina, Wolsztyn County =

Bucz Dębina
- Settlement
- Location within Poland
- Coordinates: 51°59′40″N 16°21′38″E
- Country: Poland
- Voivodeship: Greater Poland
- County: Wolsztyn
- Gmina: Przemęt

Bucz Dębina [ˈbut͡ʂ dɛmˈbina] is a settlement in the administrative district of Gmina Przemęt, within Wolsztyn County, Greater Poland Voivodeship, in west-central Poland.
