= Kaszczor =

- Village
- Location within Poland
- Coordinates: 51°57′31″N 16°9′49″E
- Country: Poland
- Voivodeship: Greater Poland
- County: Wolsztyn
- Parish: Przemęt
- Population: 1,070
- Website: http://www.kaszczor.pl/

Kaszczor [ˈkaʂt͡ʂɔr] is a village in the administrative district of Gmina Przemęt, within Wolsztyn County, Greater Poland Voivodeship, in west-central Poland.
