= Biskupice, Wolsztyn County =

Biskupice
- Village
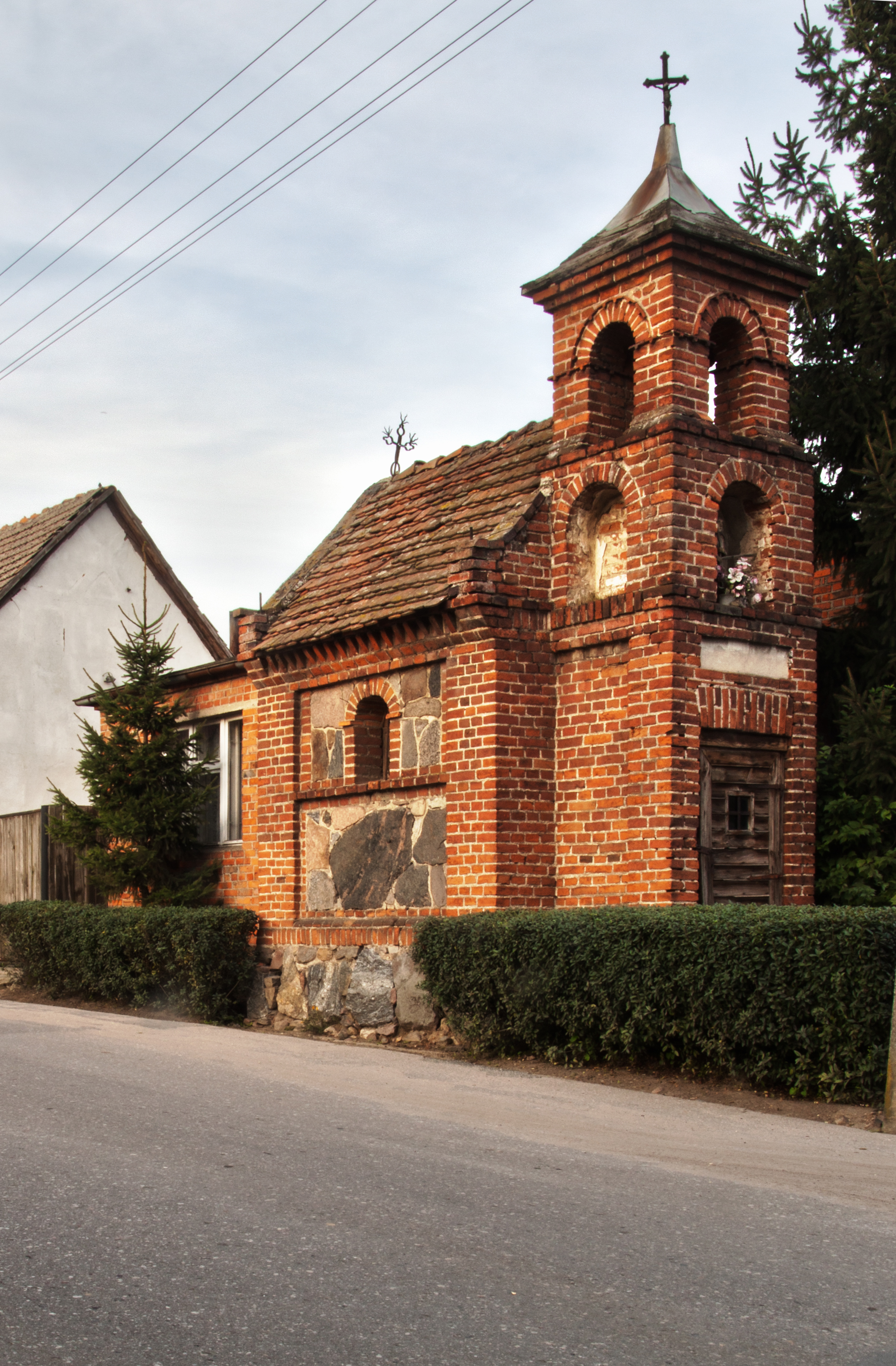
- Chapel in Biskupice

- Location within Poland
- Coordinates: 51°59′N 16°25′E
- Country: Poland
- Voivodeship: Greater Poland
- County: Wolsztyn
- Gmina: Przemęt
- Time zone: UTC+1 (CET)
  - Summer (DST): UTC+2 (CEST)

Biskupice [biskuˈpit͡sɛ] is a village in the administrative district of Gmina Przemęt, within Wolsztyn County, Greater Poland Voivodeship, in western Poland.
