= Starkowo, Greater Poland Voivodeship =

Starkowo
- Village
- Location within Poland
- Coordinates: 51°58′40″N 16°18′34″E
- Country: Poland
- Voivodeship: Greater Poland
- County: Wolsztyn
- Gmina: Przemęt
- Population (approx.): 500

Starkowo [starˈkɔvɔ] is a village in the administrative district of Gmina Przemęt, within Wolsztyn County, Greater Poland Voivodeship, in west-central Poland.

The village has an approximate population of 500.
