= Barchlin =

- Village
- Location within Poland
- Coordinates: 52°1′N 16°24′E
- Country: Poland
- Voivodeship: Greater Poland
- County: Wolsztyn
- Gmina: Przemęt
- Population: 413

Barchlin [ˈbarxlin] is a village in the administrative district of Gmina Przemęt, within Wolsztyn County, Greater Poland Voivodeship, in west-central Poland.
