= Kluczewo, Wolsztyn County =

Kluczewo
- Village
- Location within Poland
- Coordinates: 52°2′6″N 16°22′15″E
- Country: Poland
- Voivodeship: Greater Poland
- County: Wolsztyn
- Gmina: Przemęt
- Population: 646

Kluczewo [kluˈt͡ʂɛvɔ] is a village in the administrative district of Gmina Przemęt, within Wolsztyn County, Greater Poland Voivodeship, in west-central Poland.
