= Borek, Wolsztyn County =

Borek
- Village
- Location within Poland
- Coordinates: 52°02′25″N 16°24′18″E
- Country: Poland
- Voivodeship: Greater Poland
- County: Wolsztyn
- Gmina: Przemęt
- Population: 120

Borek [ˈbɔrɛk] is a village in the administrative district of Gmina Przemęt, within Wolsztyn County, Greater Poland Voivodeship, in west-central Poland.
