= Przemęt, Greater Poland Voivodeship =

Przemęt
- Village
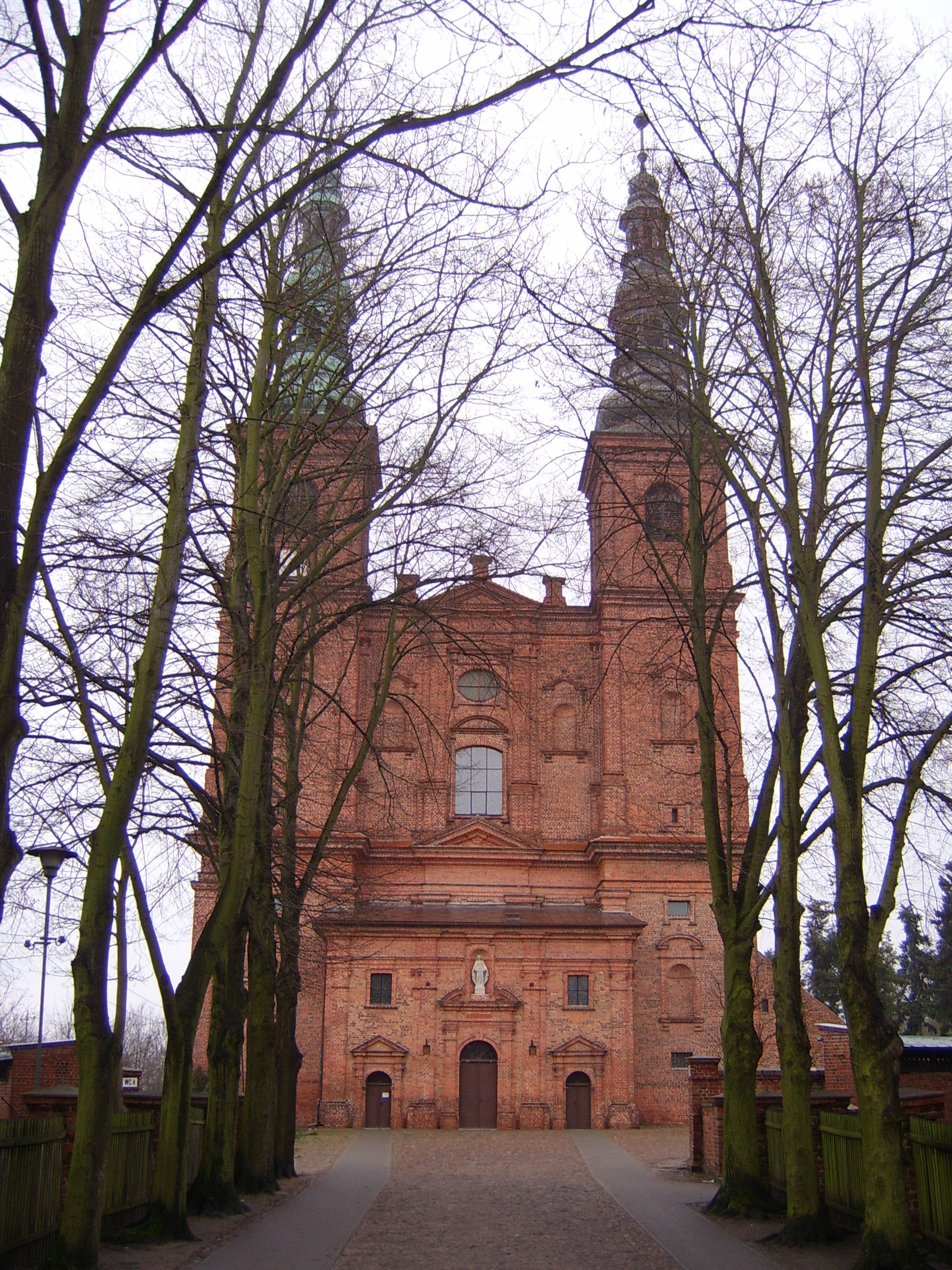
- Saint John the Baptist Cathedral

- Coat of arms

- Location within Poland
- Coordinates: 52°1′N 16°18′E
- Country: Poland
- Voivodeship: Greater Poland
- County: Wolsztyn
- Gmina: Przemęt
- Population: 1,600

Przemęt [ˈpʂɛmɛnt] is a village in Wolsztyn County, Greater Poland Voivodeship, in west-central Poland. It is the seat of the gmina (administrative district) called Gmina Przemęt. It also gives its name to the surrounding protected area called Przemęt Landscape Park.
