= Roundhouse (windmill) =

Part of a post mill that encloses the trestle

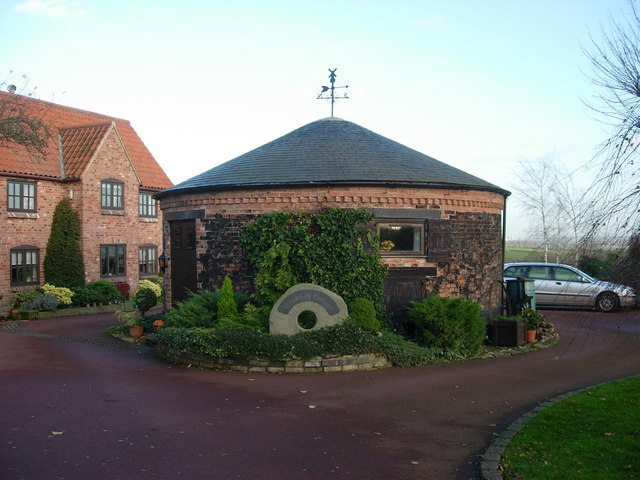
The surviving roundhouse of a post mill at Upton, Nottinghamshire, UK.

A roundhouse is the part of a post mill that encloses the trestle. It serves two functions; to protect the trestle from the weather and to provide storage space.

== Post mills ==
Early medieval post mills had their trestles partly buried in the ground. This gave the mill stability, but had the disadvantage that the trestle would rot where it met the ground. This type of mill was called the Sunk post mill. By making the mill bigger, it was possible to raise the trestle out of the ground. These mills are called open trestle post mills. The trestle of the mill, whilst clear of the ground, is still exposed to the elements. By adding a structure around the trestle, it is protected from the elements, with the added advantage of creating additional dry storage space for grain and flour. These mills are called a post mill with roundhouse. Some open trestle post mills had a roundhouse added later, for example Drinkstone, Suffolk c.1830. Other mills were built with a roundhouse from new. Single storey roundhouses had two doors directly opposite each other to give safe access and egress whichever way the wind was blowing from.

A roundhouse is usually, but not always round. Polygonal roundhouses also exist. A roundhouse may be of one, two or three storeys. The latter were most common amongst windmills in Suffolk, where the post mill reached its peak of design. A tall roundhouse raised the mill above the trees and enabled it to better catch the wind. Sometimes a mill was raised, such as the Black Mill, Southwold, Suffolk in 1863 following gale damage. It originally had a single-storey roundhouse, but had a two-storey roundhouse after it was rebuilt. Generally, the roundhouse has no structural function, with the exception of roundhouses in the Midlands region of the United Kingdom, where they carried a curb and through wheels on the underside of the buck of the mill, they carried some weight from the mill, a task usually performed solely by the trestle.

Often, when a post mill was demolished, the roundhouse was left standing. Some of these roundhouses survive, either as stores converted into dwellings.
