= Wincentowo, Wolsztyn County =

Wincentowo
- Settlement
- Location within Poland
- Coordinates: 52°1′N 16°8′E
- Country: Poland
- Voivodeship: Greater Poland
- County: Wolsztyn
- Gmina: Przemęt

Wincentowo [vint͡sɛnˈtɔvɔ] is a settlement in the administrative district of Gmina Przemęt, within Wolsztyn County, Greater Poland Voivodeship, in west-central Poland.
