= Post mill =

Earliest type of European windmill

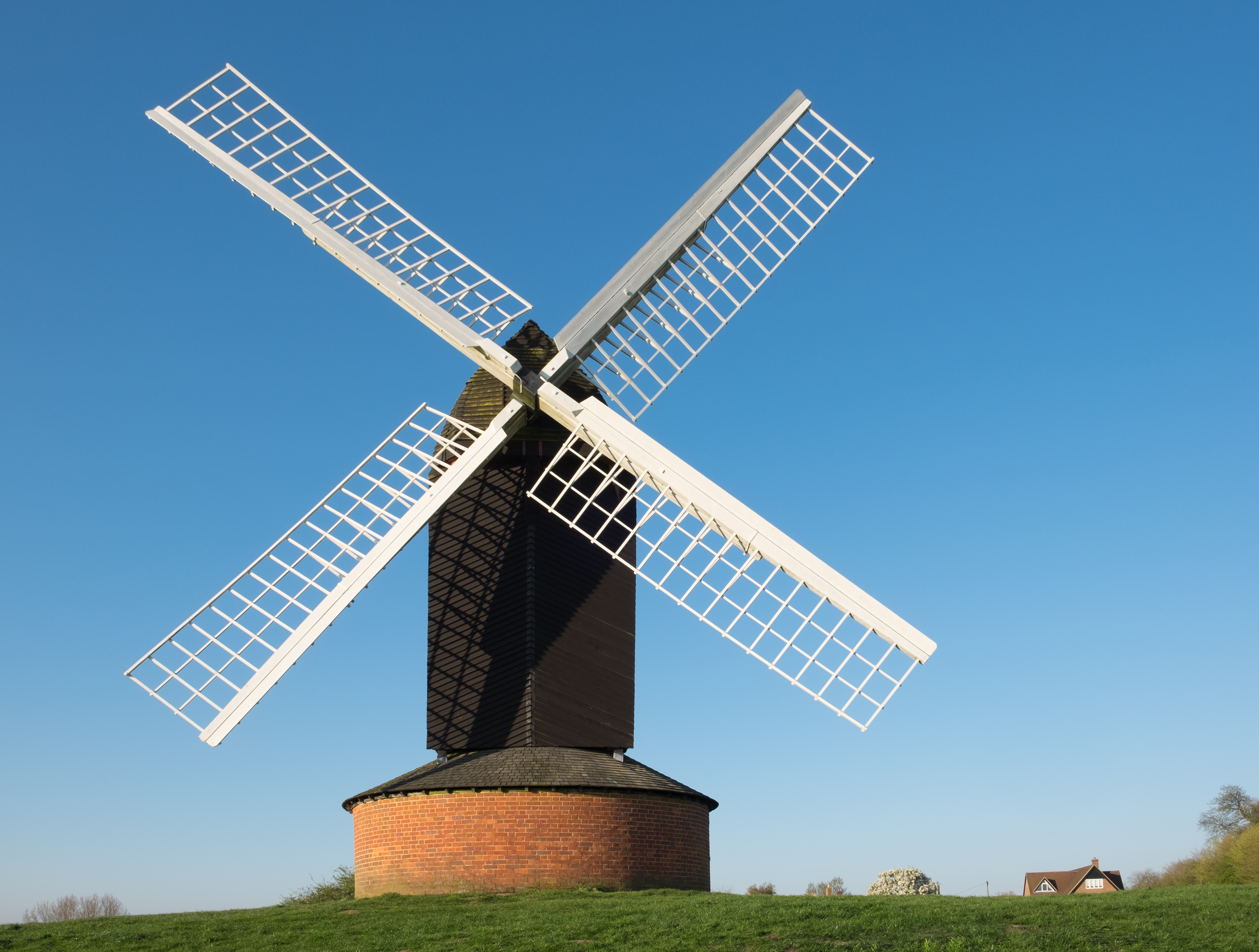
Brill windmill, a 17th-century post mill in Buckinghamshire

The post mill is the earliest type of European windmill. Its defining feature is that the whole body of the mill that houses the machinery is mounted on a single central vertical post. The vertical post is supported by four quarter bars. These are struts that steady the central post.

The body of the windmill can be turned around the central post to bring the sails into the wind. All post mills have an arm projecting from them on the side opposite the sails and reaching down to near ground level. With some, as at Saxtead Green, the arm carries a fantail to turn the mill automatically. With the others the arm serves to rotate the mill into the wind by hand.

The earliest post mills in England are thought to have been built in the 12th century. The earliest working post mill in England still used today is to be found at Outwood, Surrey. It was built in 1665. The earliest remaining example of a non-operational mill can be found in Great Gransden in Cambridgeshire, built in 1612. Their design and usage peaked in the 18th and 19th centuries and then declined after the introduction of high-speed steam-driven milling machinery. Many still exist today, primarily in Northern Europe and Great Britain. The term peg mill or peg and post mill (in which the "post" was the tailpole used to turn the mill into the wind) was used in north-west England, and stob mill in north-east England, to describe mills of this type.

Post mills dominated the scene in Europe until the 19th century when tower mills began to replace them. The advantage of the tower mill over the earlier post mill is that it is not necessary to turn the whole mill ("body", "buck") with all its machinery into the wind; this allows more space for the machinery as well as for storage.

== Types of post mill ==
There are many variations among post mills.

=== Sunk post mill ===
The earliest post mills were quite small, and this led to problems with stability as they were liable to blow down in strong winds. A solution was found by burying the bottom of the trestle in a mound of earth. The last sunk post mills in England were at Warton, Lancashire, and Essington, Staffordshire.

=== Open trestle post mill ===
As mills were made bigger, it was found that the trestle did not need to be buried. Thus the open trestle post mills were built. The oldest surviving is at Great Gransden, Cambridgeshire. Others exist in the UK at Bourn, Cambridgeshire; Great Chishill, Cambridgeshire; Nutley, Sussex and Chillenden, Kent. Open trestle post mills are also found in France, Belgium, the Netherlands, Germany and in New England, USA.

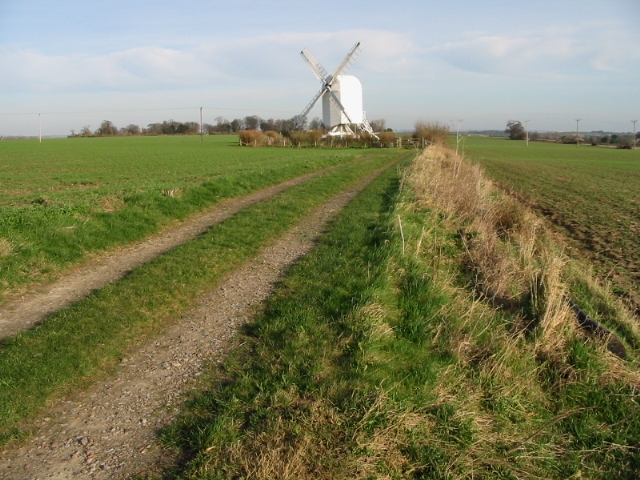
Chillenden post mill, built in 1868.

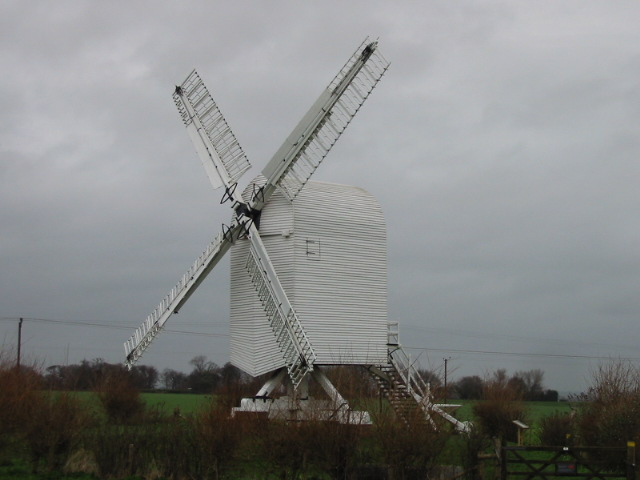
Chillenden open trestle post mill (another view).

=== Post mill with roundhouse ===
The space around the trestle could be used for storage, but was open to the weather. Mill owners started to build roundhouses around the trestles, and later mills were built with a roundhouse from new. This had the dual advantage of creating a covered storage area and protecting the trestle from bad weather. In Suffolk, millwrights would build post mills mounted on tall, two or three storey roundhouses, as at Saxtead Green.

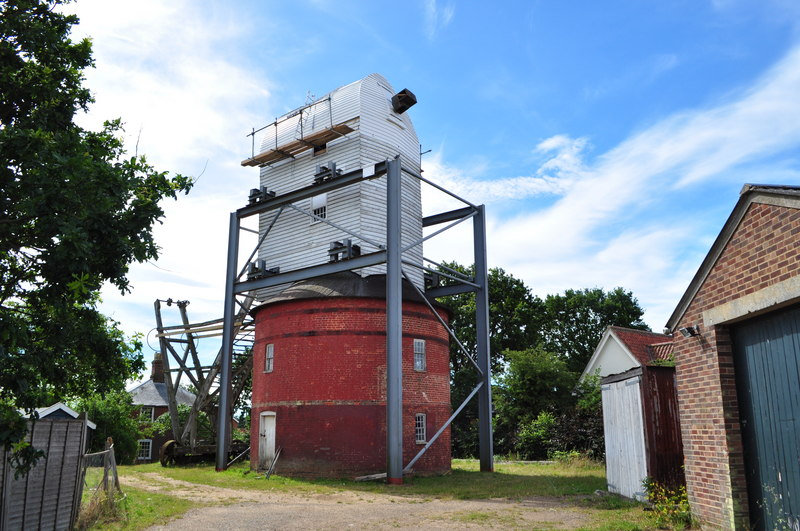
Friston Post Mill, near Friston, Suffolk.

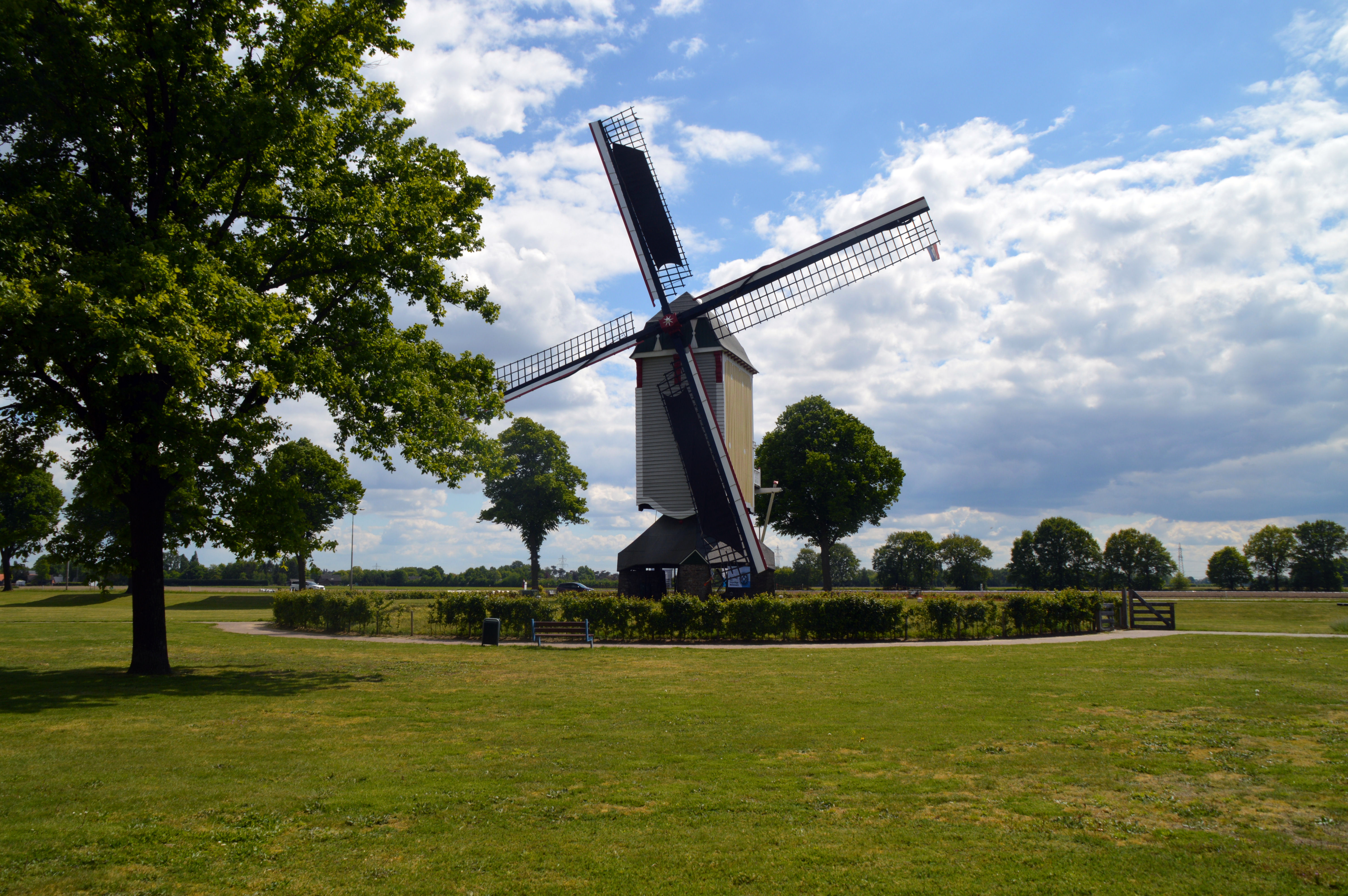
Aurora Post Mill (1845) Baexem, Netherlands

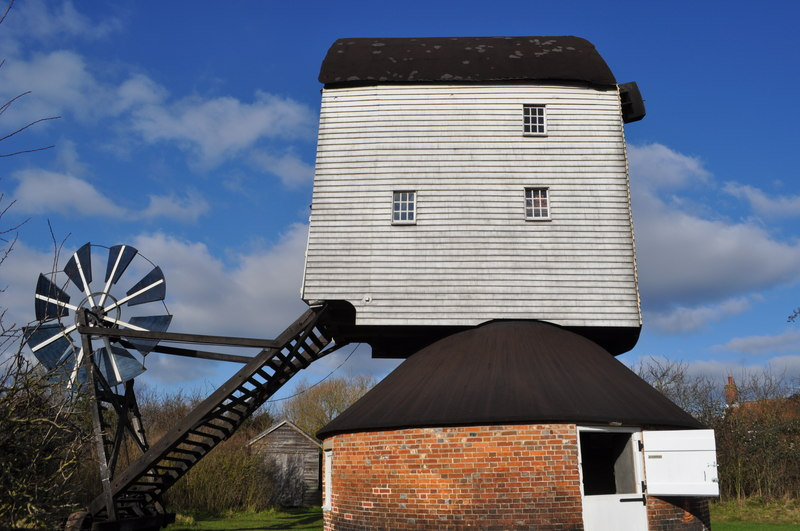
Garboldisham Post Mill; the mill is complete inside, externally only missing the sails.

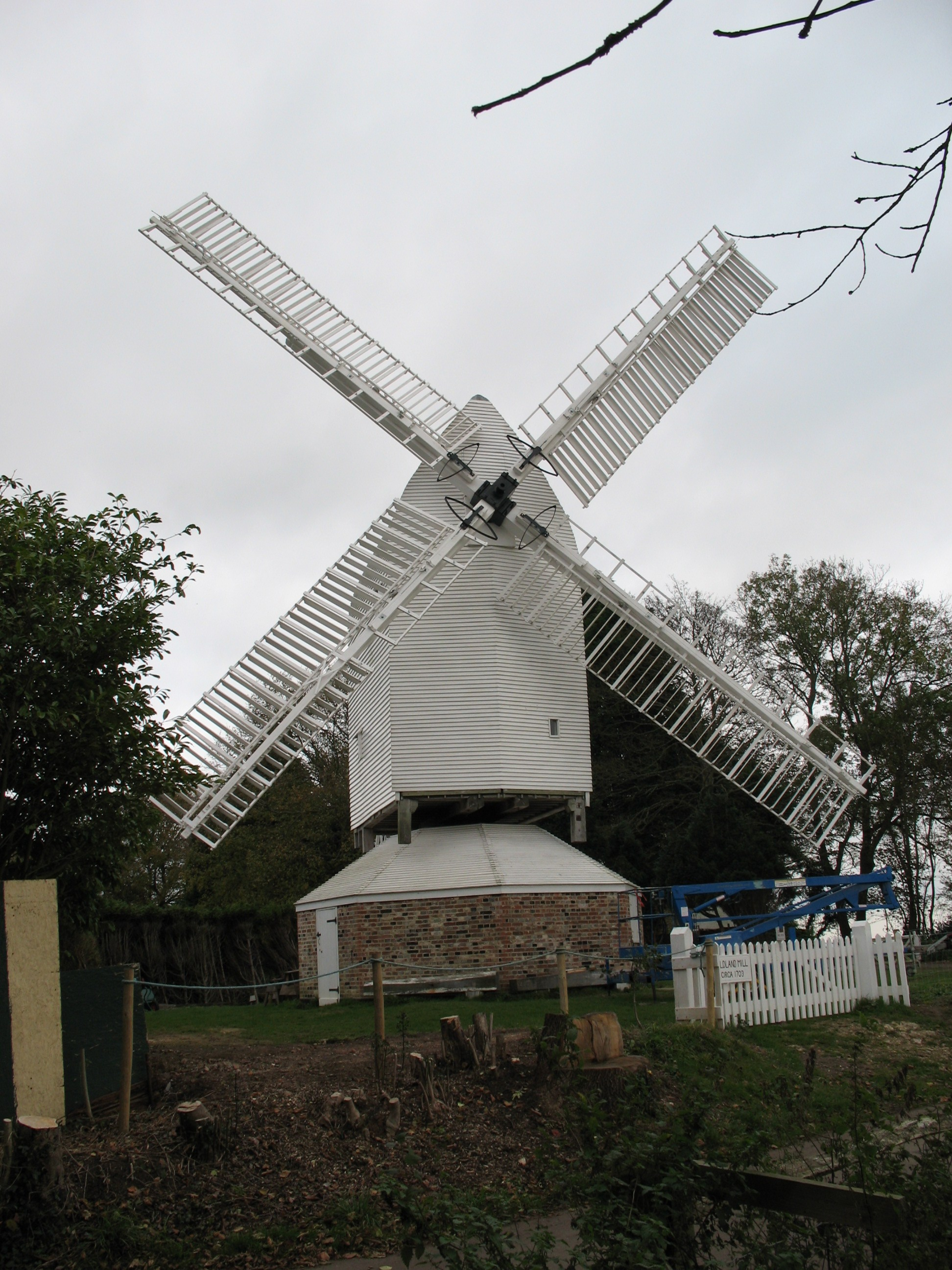
Post mill with roundhouse.

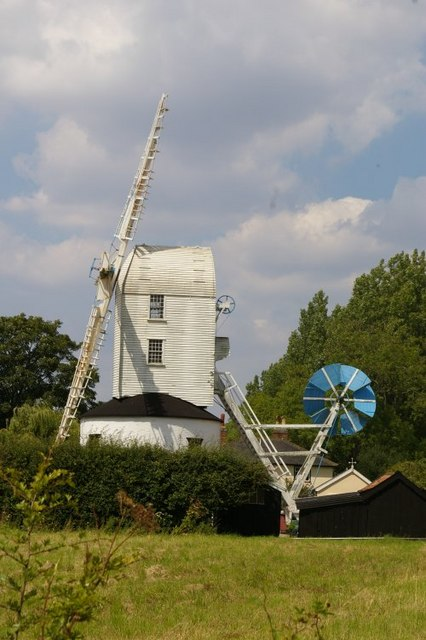
Saxtead Green Post Mill roundhouse is partially obscured by a hedgerow.

==== Midlands post mill ====
In the Midlands and North West of England, the top of the roundhouse had a curb, and rollers affixed to the mill body enabled the roundhouse to bear some of the weight of the mill. Examples of Midlands post mills extant include Danzey Green mill, (preserved at Avoncroft Museum of Historic Buildings) and the mill at Wrawby, Lincolnshire.

==== Alternative ways to protect the trestle ====
In eastern Europe, instead of a roundhouse an "apron" was fitted to the bottom of the body of the mill, enclosing the trestle and thereby affording protection from the weather.

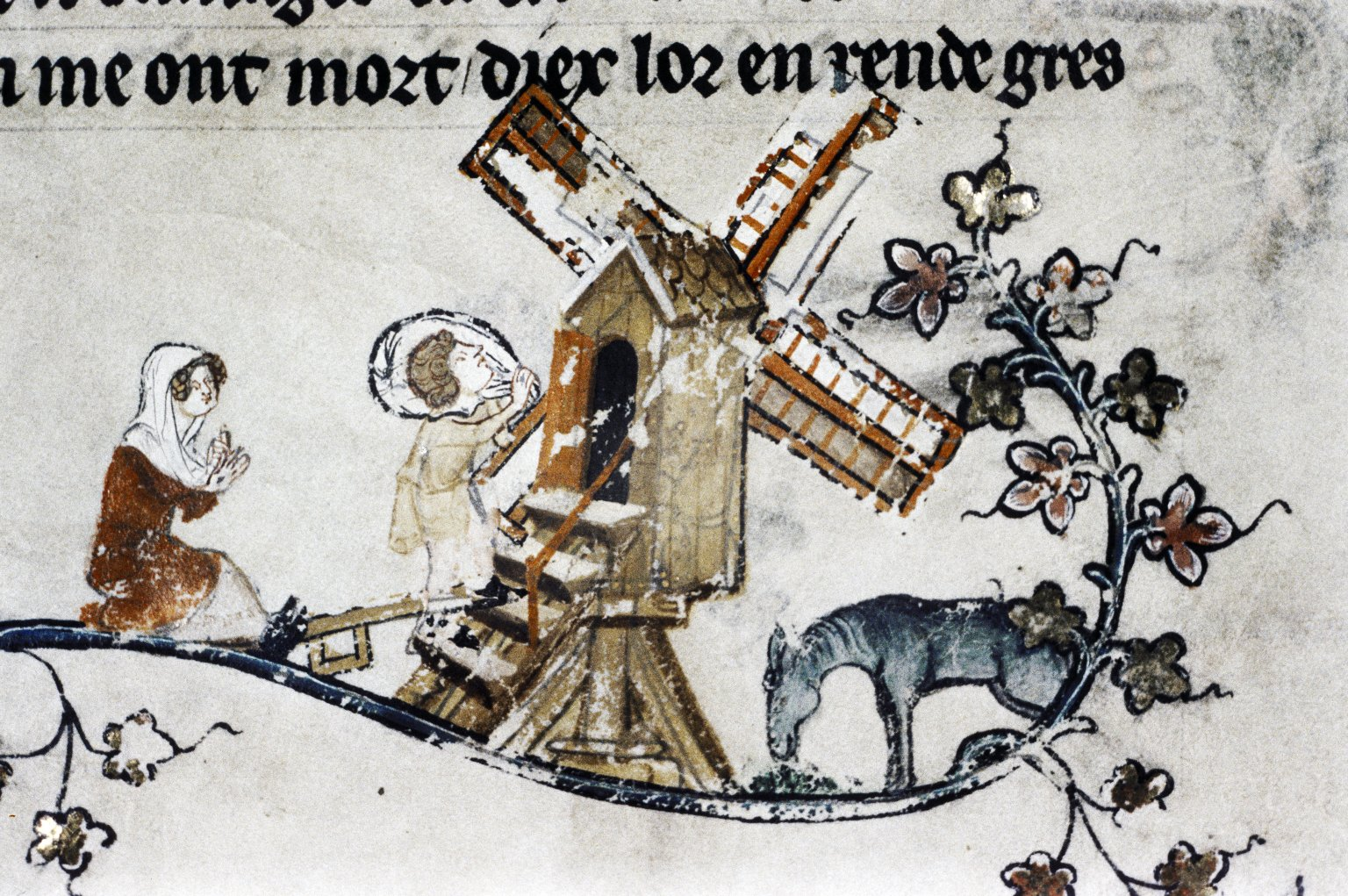
Medieval illustration of a sunk post mill.

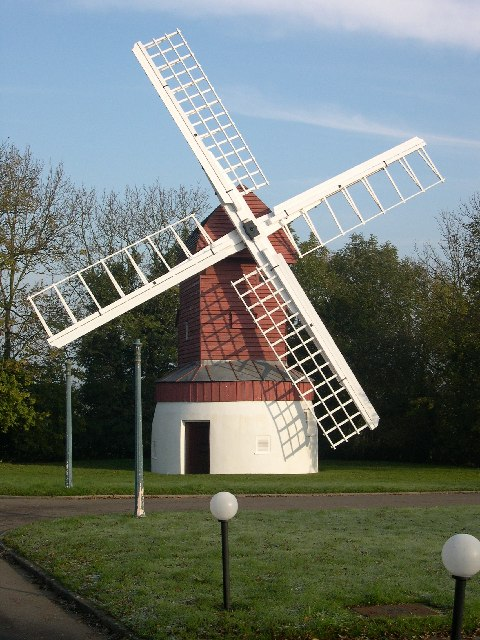
Midlands post mill.

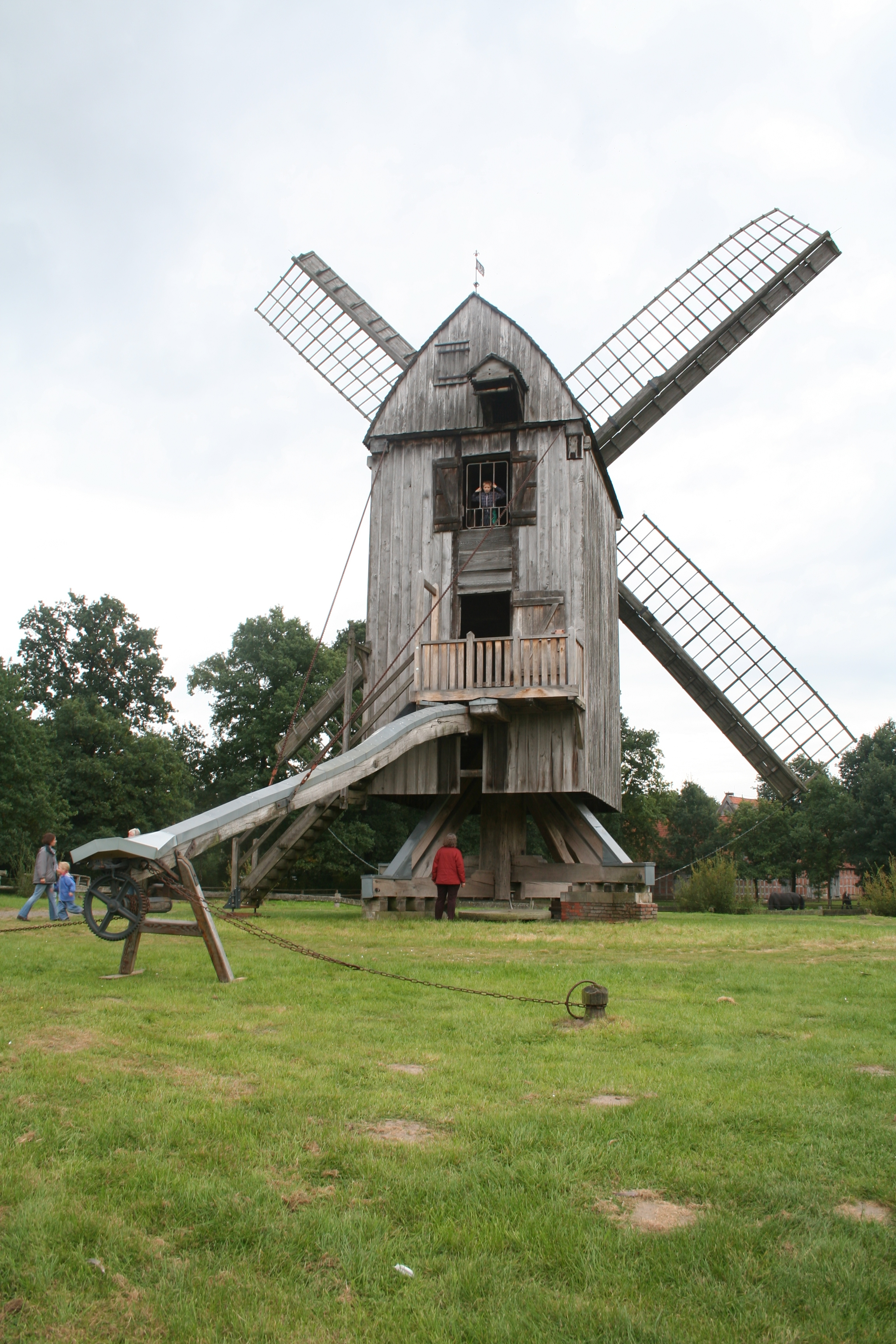
Post mill, rebuilt in the open-air museum at Cloppenburg, Germany.

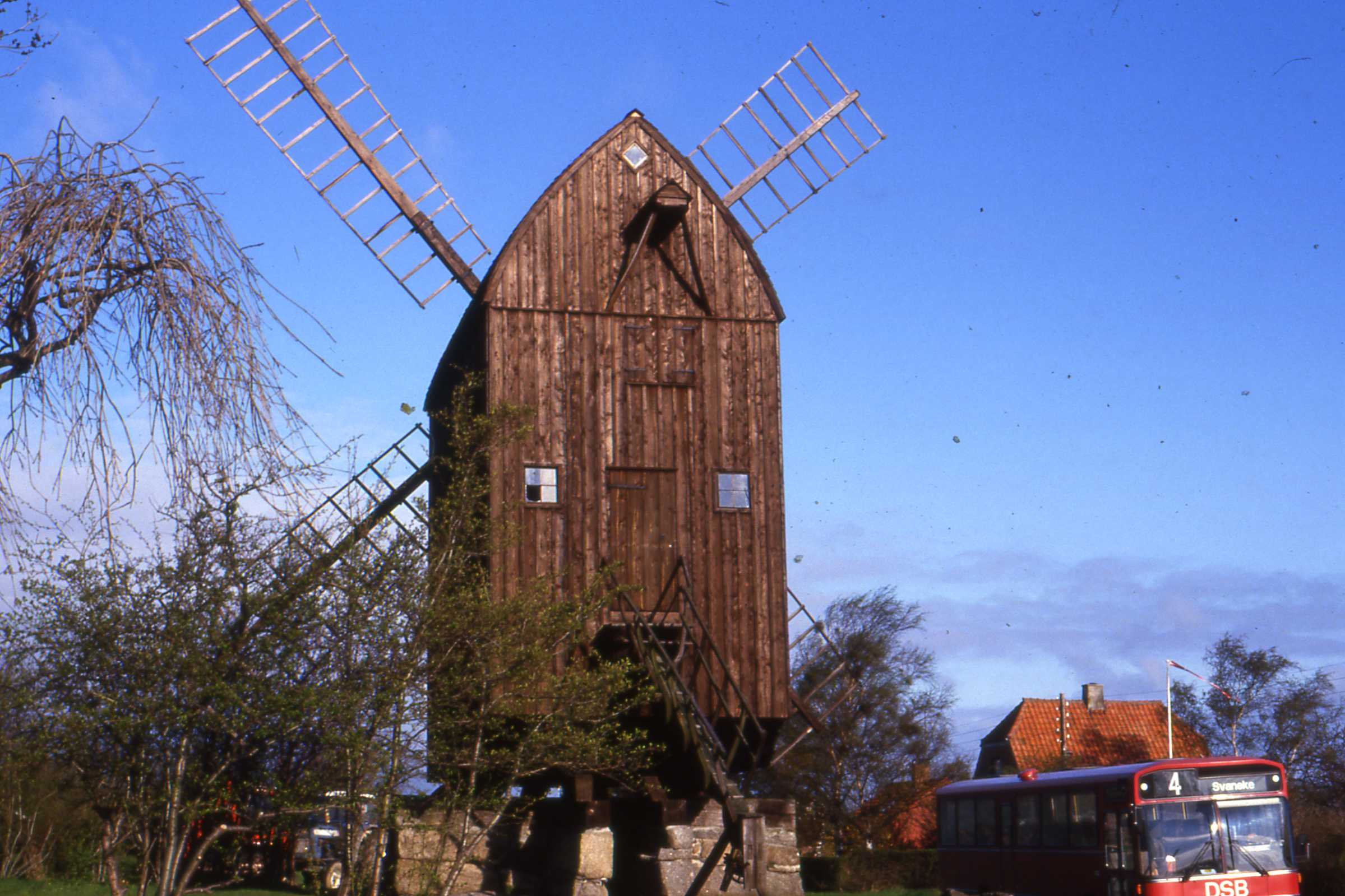
Wooden post mill in Svaneke, Denmark.

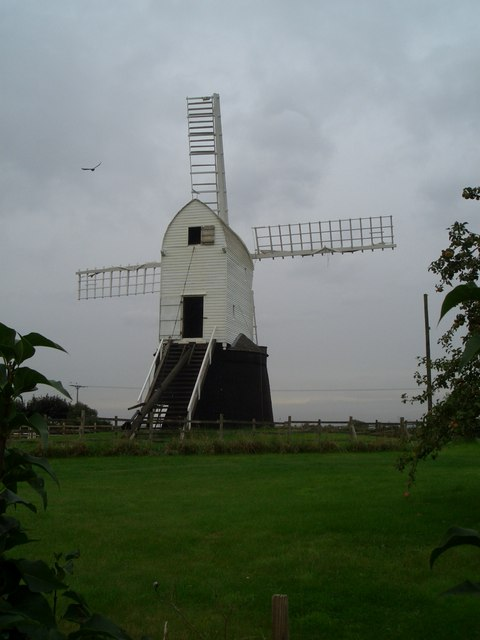
Wrawby post mill – restored to have four sails.

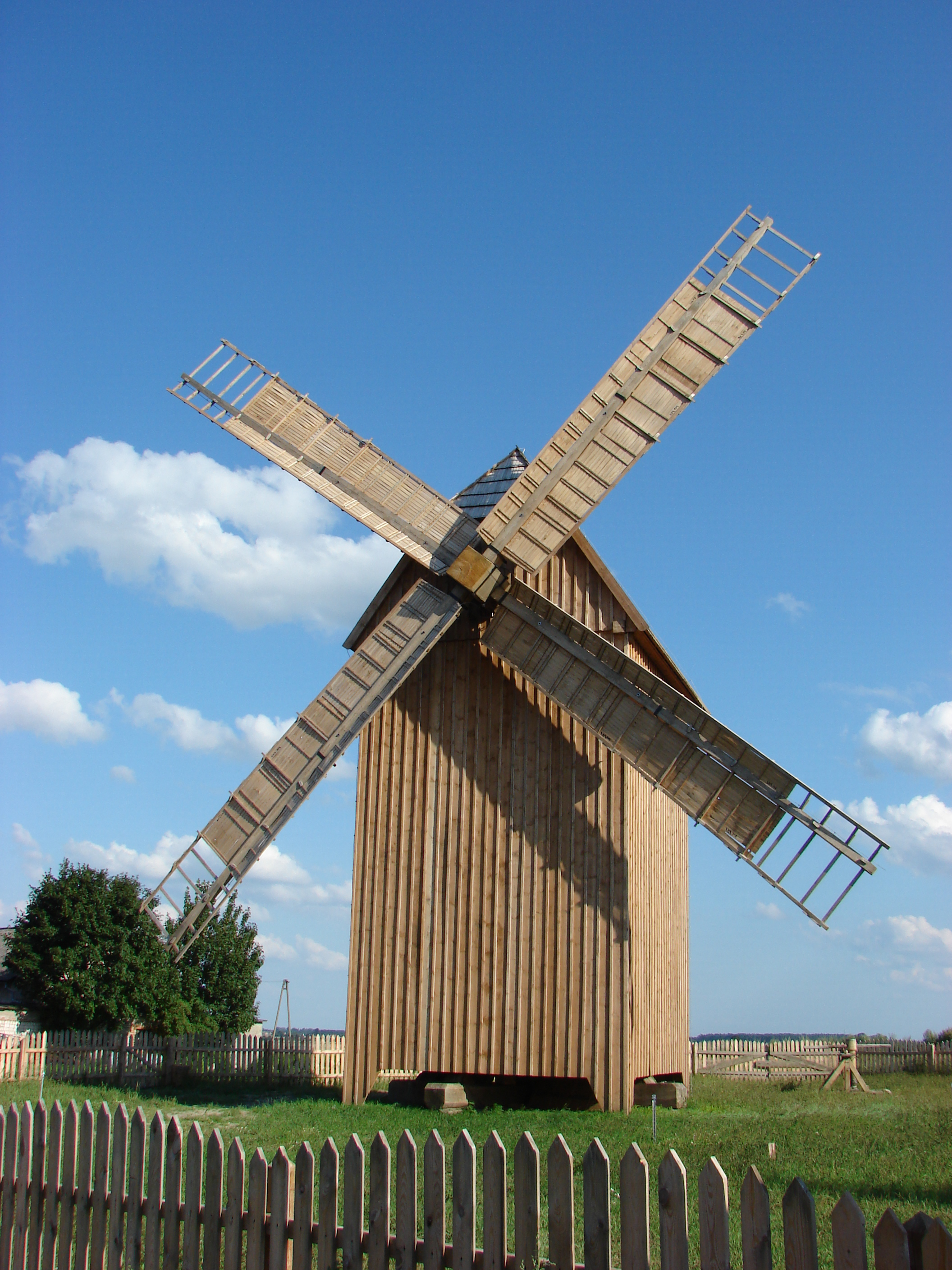
A Polish post mill (Bierzgłowo near Toruń).

=== Hollow Post mill ===
Some post mills are hollow post mills. In these mills the main post is bored to take a driveshaft, similar to an Upright Shaft in a smock or tower mill. This enables the mill to drive machinery in the base or roundhouse. Hollow post mills were not common in the United Kingdom. In the Netherlands, they are called Wipmolen and were mostly used for drainage. In France, the Moulin Cavier was a type of hollow post mill used for corn milling.

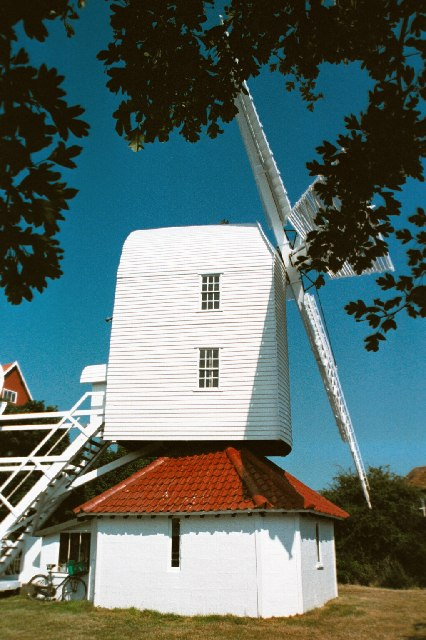
Hollow post Thorpeness Windmill.

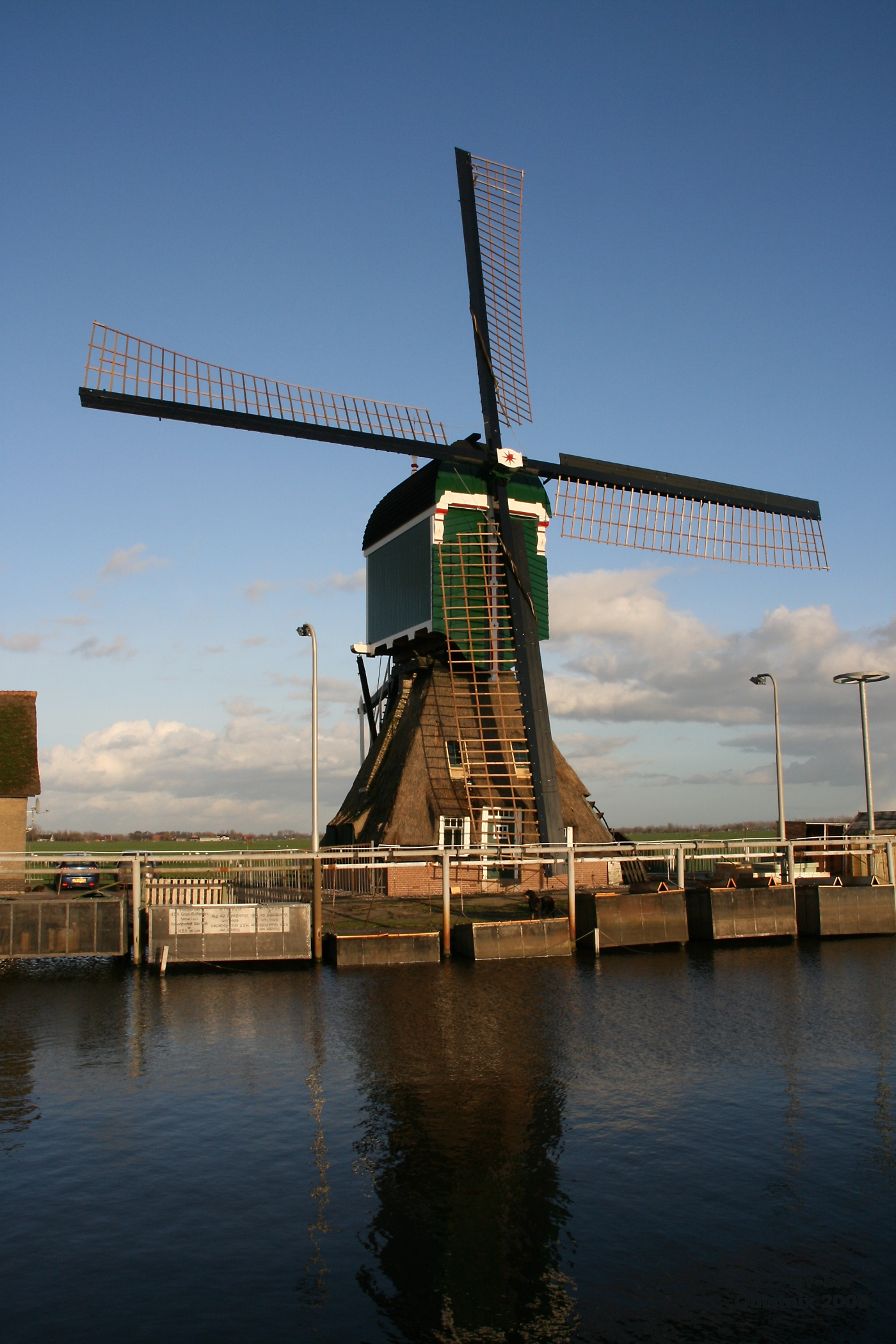
Wipmolen

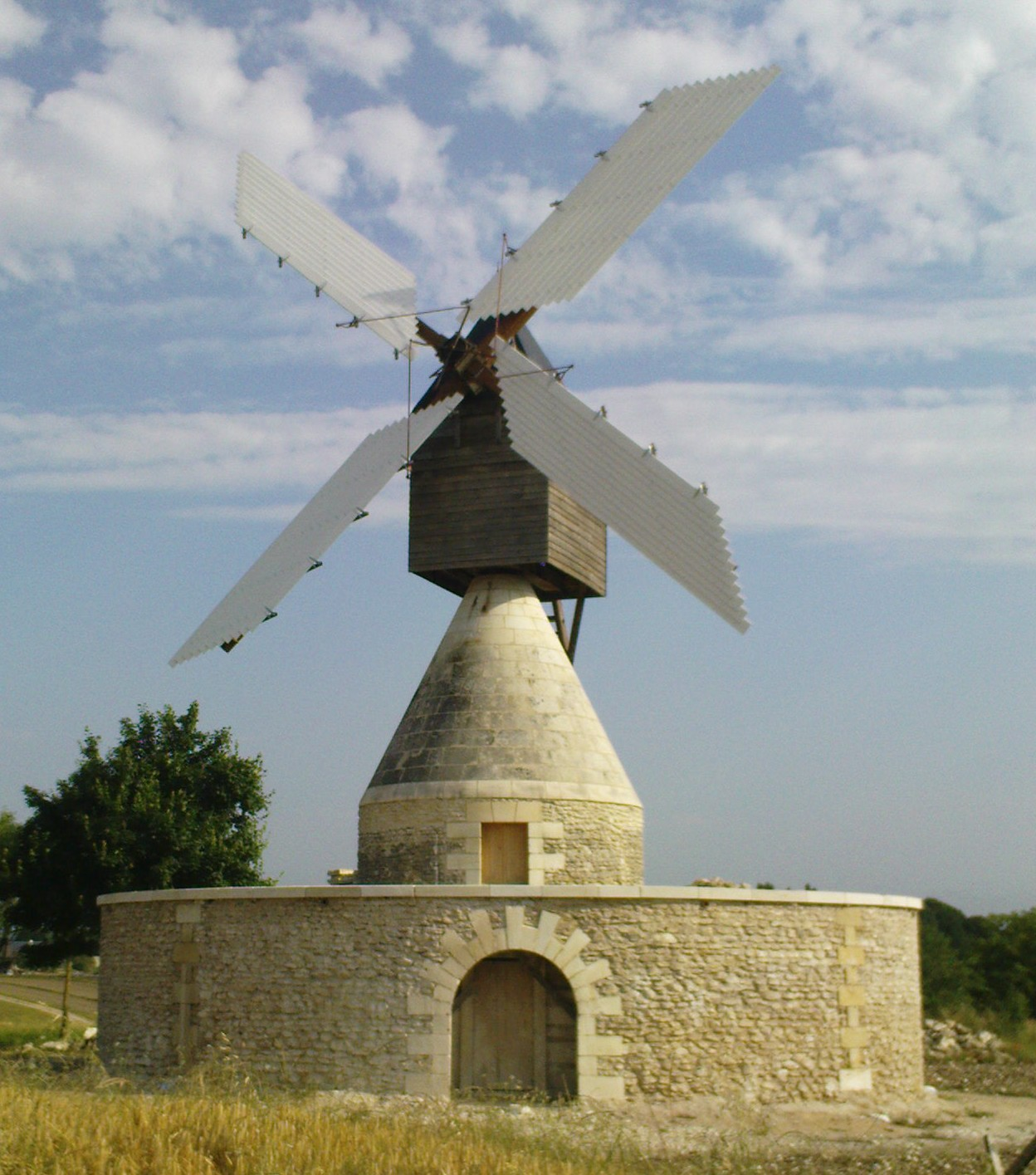
Moulin Cavier.

=== Composite mill ===
A few mills looked like post mills, but were not post mills. These composite mills often had a post mill body mounted on a short tower resembling a roundhouse, as at Banham and Thornham in Norfolk. Composite mills lack the central post on which the body of the post mill is mounted and turns upon to enable the mill to face the wind.

=== Paltrok mill ===
In the Netherlands and Germany, a variety of mill called the paltrok (Low German spelling Paltrock, from High German Pfalzrock (palisade skirt); the shape of the millhouse resembles that kind of garment) was built. Though similar in name and appearance, Dutch and German paltrok mills differ in historical and technical regard.

The Dutch paltrok mill was invented around 1600 and specifically designed for sawing wood. Several hundred have existed of this type of windmill; however, only five paltrok mills remain in the Netherlands, at Zaanse Schans, Haarlem, Zaandam, Amsterdam and at the Netherlands Open Air Museum, Arnhem. Dutch paltrok mills are, like post windmills, supported on a central wooden post around which the entire millhouse rotates. The central post, however, is short and, to provide stability, a rim bearing is added on a brick base, on which the millhouse rotates with numerous rollers. Side extensions protect the sawing floor and workmen from the weather.

German paltrok mills were commonly converted from post mills where the post and trestle were replaced by a wooden or iron rim bearing, set into the ground or on a brick base. The millhouse was enlarged and supported on this rim by numerous rollers or small wheels. These mills are technically composite mills although the tower is very short and of large diameter. This type of mill provided more internal space than a post mill and was cheaper than the alternative of erecting a smock mill.

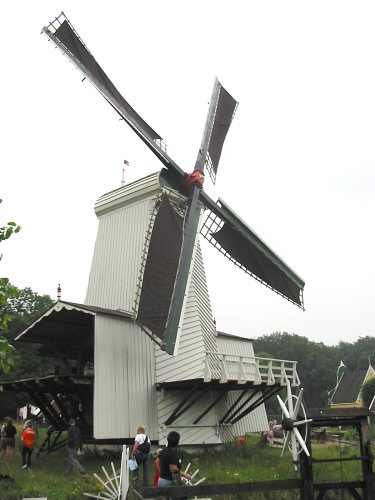
Paltrok mill Mijn Genoegen in the Netherlands Open Air Museum

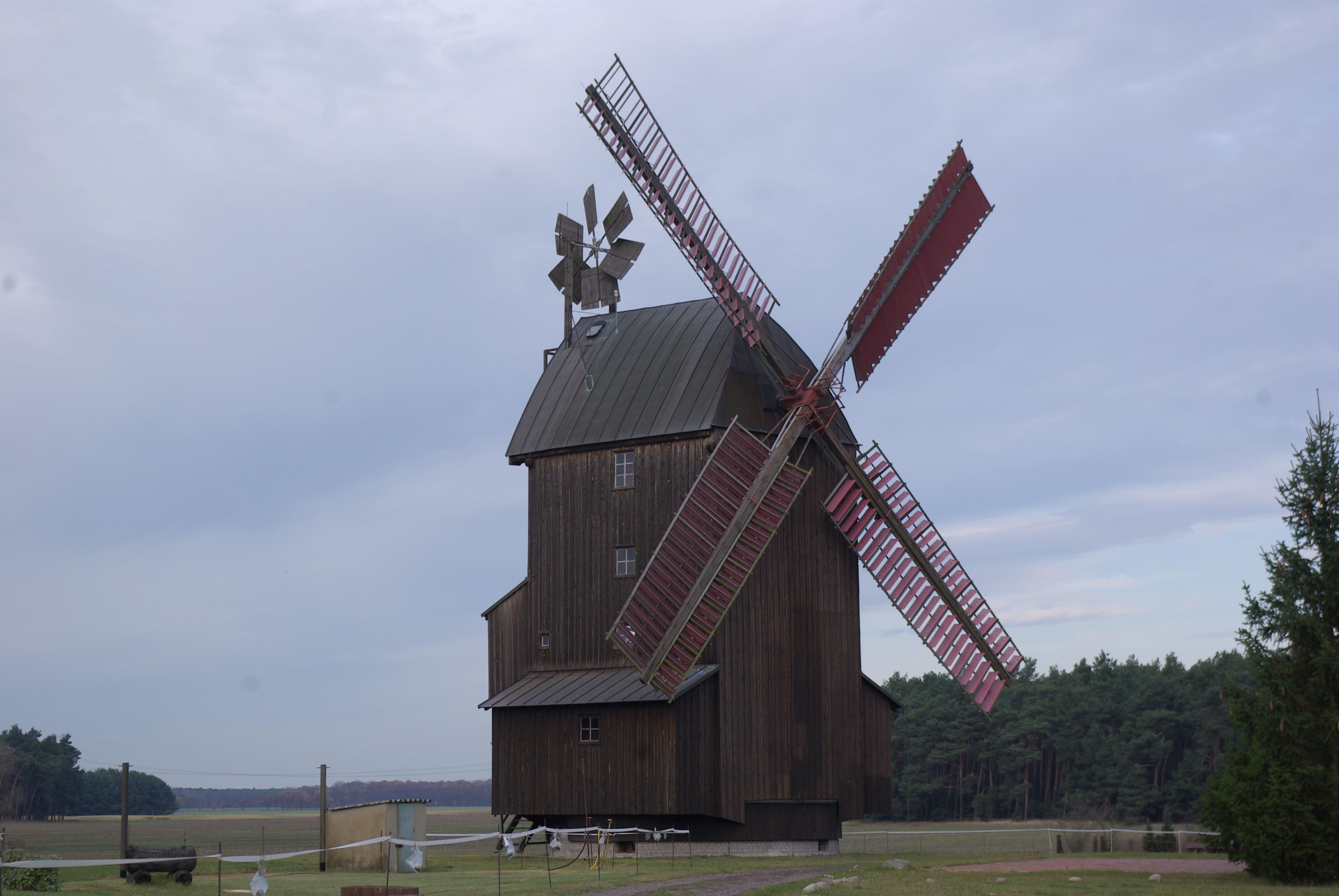
Paltrock mill at Schönewalde in Elbe-Elster, Brandenburg, Germany

== General sources ==
- Smith, Arthur C (1977). Windmills in Huntingdon and Peterborough, a contemporary survey. Stevenage: Stevenage Museum. ISBN 0-9504239-4-7.
- Jarvis, P S (1982). Stability in Windmills. Reading: TIMS.
