= Gmina Przemęt =

Gmina Przemęt Przemęt Commune
- Gmina
- Coat of arms

- Location within Poland
- Coordinates (Przemęt): 52°1′N 16°18′E
- Country: Poland
- Voivodeship: Greater Poland
- County: Wolsztyn
- Seat: Przemęt

Area
  - Total: 225.31 km^{2} (86.99 sq mi)

Population (2011)
  - Total: 13,837
  - Density: 61.413/km^{2} (159.06/sq mi)
- Website: www.przemet.pl

Gmina Przemęt is a rural gmina (administrative district) in Wolsztyn County, Greater Poland Voivodeship, in west-central Poland. Its seat is the village of Przemęt, which lies approximately 17 kilometres (11 mi) south-east of Wolsztyn and 60 km (37 mi) south-west of the regional capital Poznań.

The gmina covers an area of 225.31 square kilometres (87.0 sq mi), and as of 2006 its total population was 13,494 (13,187 in 2011).

The gmina contains part of the protected area called Przemęt Landscape Park.

== Villages ==
Gmina Przemęt contains the villages and settlements of Barchlin, Biskupice, Błotnica, Borek, Bucz, Bucz Dębina, Bucz Nowy, Górsko, Kaszczor, Kluczewo, [Mochy], Nowa Wieś, Olejnica, Osłonin, Perkowo, Popowo Stare, Poświętno, Przemęt, Radomierz, Sączkowo, Siekówko, Siekowo, Sokołowice, Solec, Solec Nowy, Starkowo, Wieleń Zaobrzański and Wincentowo.

== Neighbouring gminas ==
Gmina Przemęt is bordered by the gminas of Rakoniewice, Sława, Śmigiel, Wielichowo, Wijewo, Włoszakowice and Wolsztyn.
