= Nowa Wieś, Wolsztyn County =

Nowa Wieś
- Village
- Location within Poland
- Coordinates: 52°00′45″N 16°12′58″E
- Country: Poland
- Voivodeship: Greater Poland
- County: Wolsztyn
- Gmina: Przemęt
- Population (approx.): 750

Nowa Wieś [ˈnɔva ˈvjɛɕ] is a village in the administrative district of Gmina Przemęt, within Wolsztyn County, Greater Poland Voivodeship, in west-central Poland.

The village has an approximate population of 750.
