= Górsko, Greater Poland Voivodeship =

Górsko
- Village
- Location within Poland
- Coordinates: 51°56′N 16°19′E
- Country: Poland
- Voivodeship: Greater Poland
- County: Wolsztyn
- Gmina: Przemęt

Górsko [ˈɡurskɔ] is a village in the administrative district of Gmina Przemęt, within Wolsztyn County, Greater Poland Voivodeship, in west-central Poland.
