= Romina Tejerina =

Argentine woman and convicted murderer

- Born: 24 June 1983 (age 43); San Pedro de Jujuy, Jujuy Province, Argentina
- Status: Paroled in 2012
- Conviction: Murder
- Penalty: 14 years in prison

Details
- Date apprehended: 25 February 2003

Romina Tejerina (born 24 June 1983) is an Argentine woman who was sentenced on 10 June 2005 to 14 years in prison for the murder of her newborn baby daughter. The baby was allegedly a product of a sexual abuse that Tejerina suffered but was too afraid to reveal.

On 23 February 2003, Tejerina gave birth in her home to a baby girl. With the help of her sister, she cut the baby's umbilical cord and placed her in a small box. A few minutes later, Tejerina attacked the baby with a knitting needle. The baby died two days later in the hospital and Tejerina was arrested.

Tejerina's alleged sexual abuse was never proved. Her claims of being abused came to light well after she was charged with murder. Her alleged abuser was found not guilty, as it was claimed that Tejerina had consensual intercourse with him. As a result, there were no elements to support her defense about her mental condition at the time of the murder. She was freed on 24 June 2012, after serving half of her 14-year sentence.
