= La Esperanza, Jujuy =

Coordinates: 24°13′26″S 64°50′17″W

La Esperanza (Jujuy)
- Municipality and town
- Interactive map of La Esperanza (Jujuy)
- Country: Argentina
- Province: Jujuy Province
- Time zone: UTC−3 (ART)

La Esperanza (Jujuy) is a town and municipality in San Pedro Department, Jujuy Province in Argentina.

It hosts an historical sugar factory, founded by British industrialists Walter (1858–1944) and William Leach (1851–1932). In 1906, German anthropologist Robert Lehmann-Nitsche signed an agreement with the Leach brothers. He had noted that workers there came from several different ethnic groups and used to sing while working. Lehmann-Nitsche recorded their songs in 30 phonograph cylinders that he sent to the Berliner Phonogramm-Archiv.

Lehmann-Nitsche was later criticized for having conducted his research ignoring the exploitation and mistreatment of the native Argentinians who worked in the factory.

In 2019, after twenty years of difficulties, the factory, which was administered by the government since 2015, was sold to an alliance of private groups.
