= Perkowo, Greater Poland Voivodeship =

Perkowo
- Village
- Location within Poland
- Coordinates: 52°0′N 16°15′E
- Country: Poland
- Voivodeship: Greater Poland
- County: Wolsztyn
- Gmina: Przemęt
- Population (approx.): 550

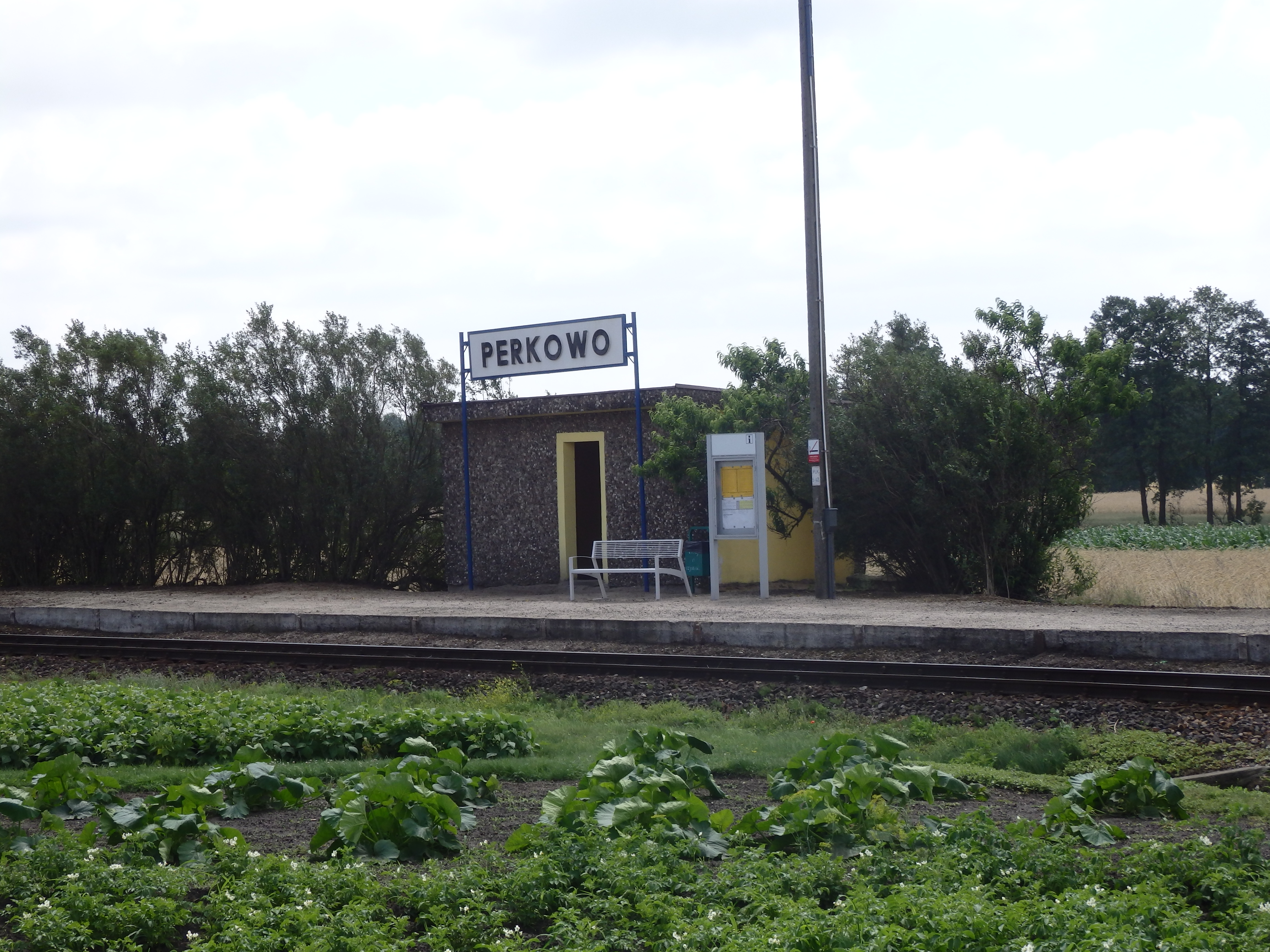
Train station in Perkowo

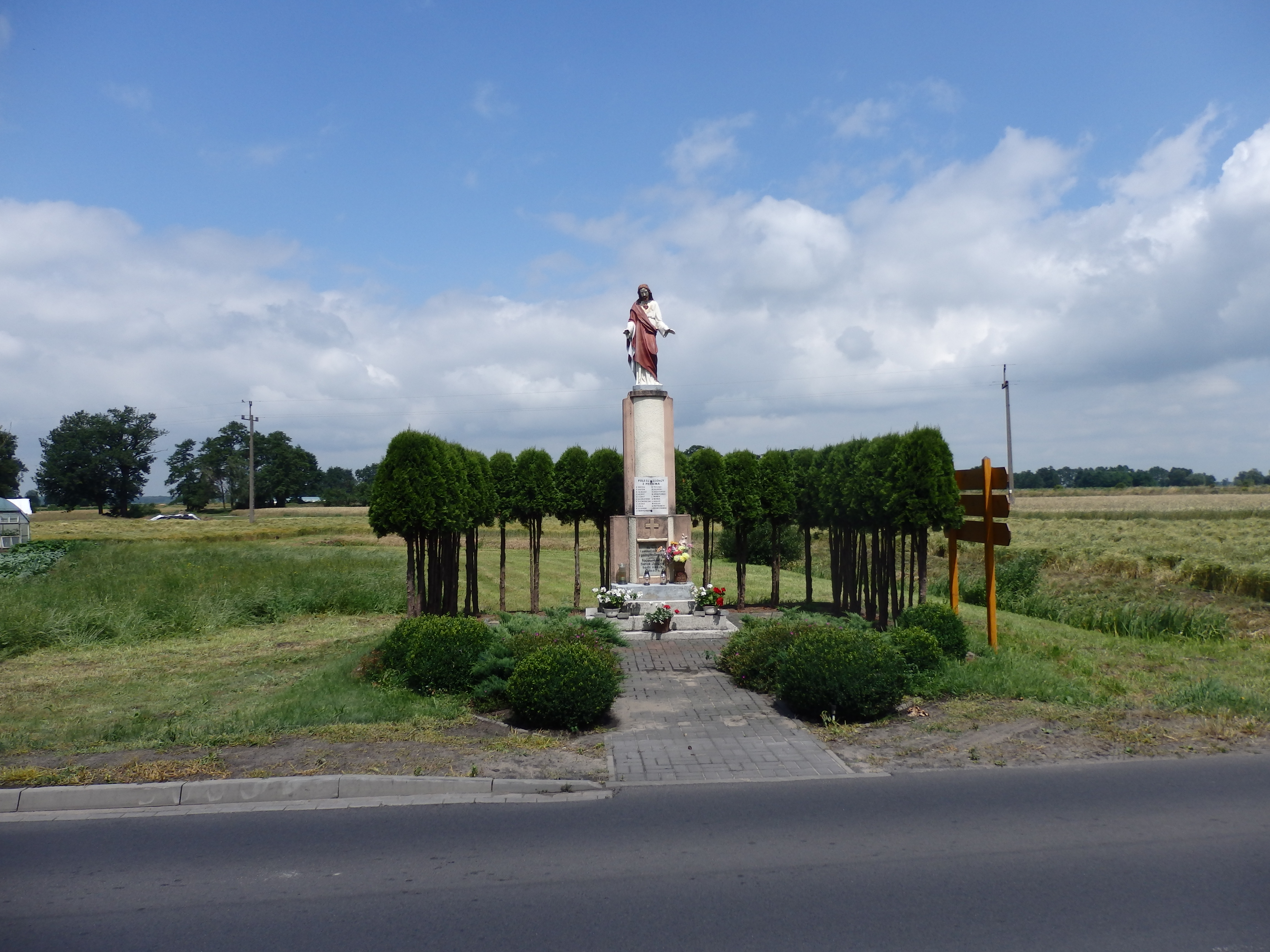
Perkowo

Perkowo [pɛrˈkɔvɔ] is a village in the administrative district of Gmina Przemęt, within Wolsztyn County, Greater Poland Voivodeship, in west-central Poland.

The village has an approximate population of 550.
