= Siekowo =

- Village
- Location within Poland
- Coordinates: 52°3′N 16°21′E
- Country: Poland
- Voivodeship: Greater Poland
- County: Wolsztyn
- Gmina: Przemęt
- Population: 496

Siekowo [ɕɛˈkɔvɔ] is a village in the administrative district of Gmina Przemęt, within Wolsztyn County, Greater Poland Voivodeship, in west-central Poland. The Village lies approximately 6 kilometres (4 mi) north-east of Przemęt, 18 km (11 mi) south-east of Wolsztyn, and 55 km (34 mi) south-west of the regional capital Poznań.

== Gallery ==
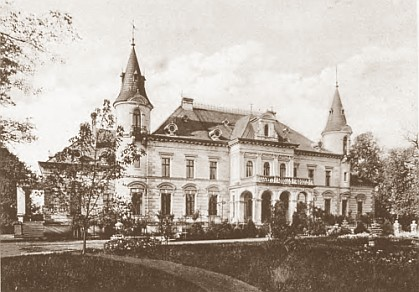
Palace in Siekowo

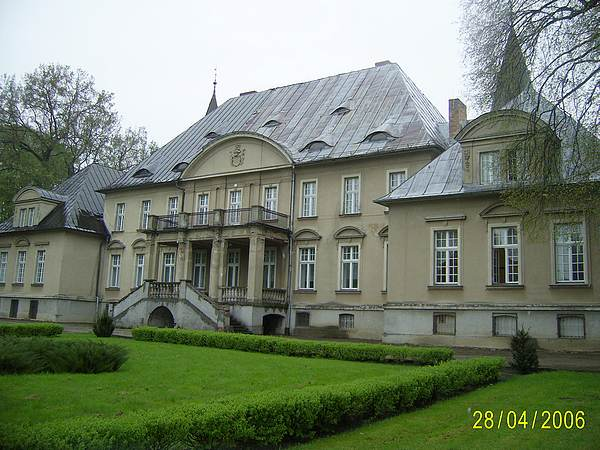
Palace in Siekowo

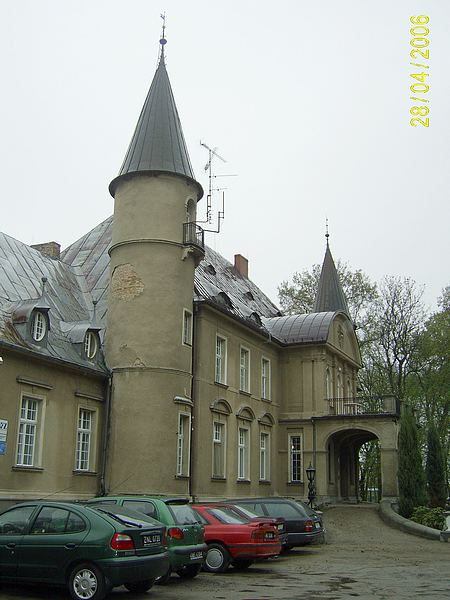
Palace in Siekowo

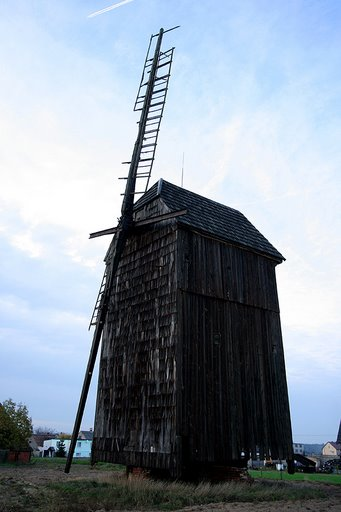
Windmill used since 1877 to 1960

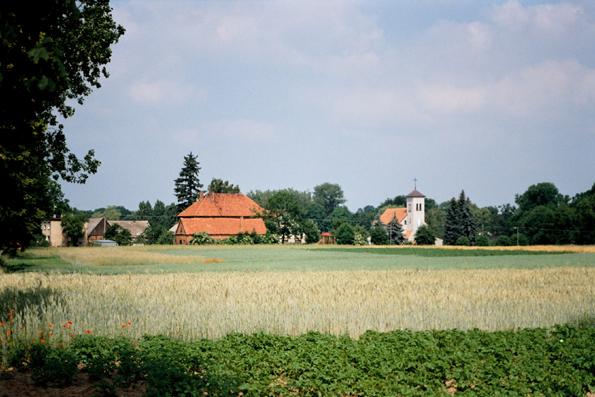
Panorama Siekowa
