= Trestle (mill) =

Part of a windmill's substructure

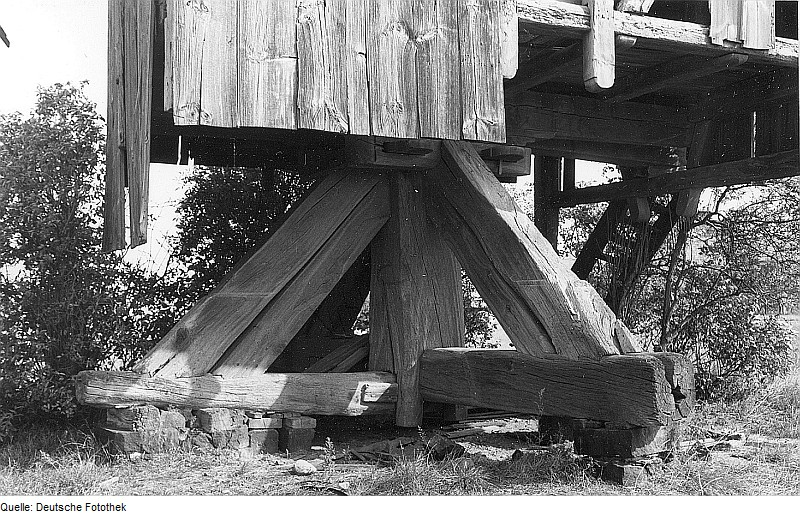
A mill's trestle.

The trestle of a post mill is the arrangement of the main post, crosstrees and quarterbars that form the substructure of this type of windmill. It may or may not be surrounded by a roundhouse. Post mills without a roundhouse are known as open trestle post mills.

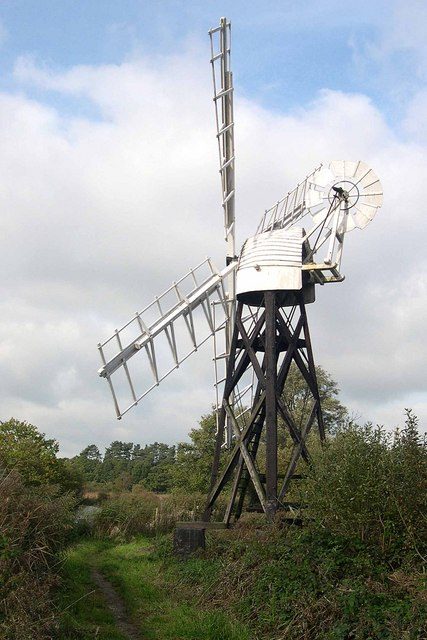
A Trestle Mill.

A trestle mill is a variety of smock mill, usually without weatherboards, formerly used for drainage in the Norfolk Broads. Examples can be found at Horning, Ludham and St Olaves.

A well preserved example of a timber crosstree, from the trestle of a medieval windmill, was excavated by archaeologists at Humberstone, near Leicester, in 2007.

== Bibliography ==
- Farries, Kenneth G. (1982). Essex Windmills, Millers and Millwrightes. Vol. Two: A Technical Review. London and Edinburgh: Charles Skilton. ISBN 0-284-98637-2.
- Smith, Arthur C. (1990). Drainage Windmills of the Norfolk Marshes. Stevenage: Arthur Smith Publication. ISBN 0-9515766-0-7.
- Coles Finch, William (1933). Watermills and Windmills. London: C. W. Daniel.
- Thomas, J. (2008). "Excavation of a Medieval Post-Mill Mound at Manor Farm, Humberstone" (PDF). University of Leicester Archaeological Services.
