= Tokarnia, Świętokrzyskie Voivodeship =

Tokarnia
- Village
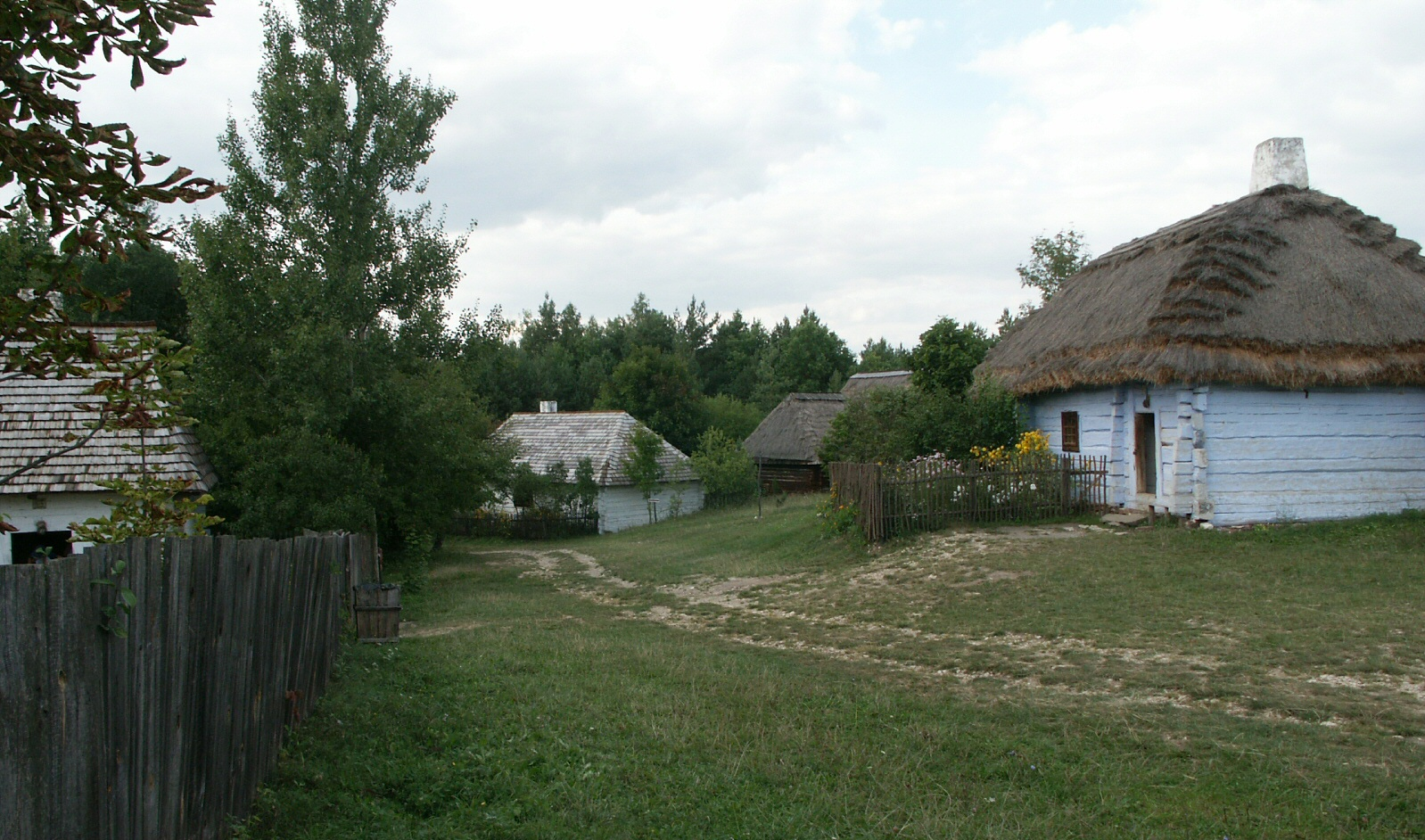
- Old cottages in Kielce Countryside Museum in Tokarnia

- Location within Poland
- Coordinates: 50°45′58″N 20°26′42″E
- Country: Poland
- Voivodeship: Świętokrzyskie
- County: Kielce
- Gmina: Chęciny
- Population: 1,400

Tokarnia [tɔˈkarɲa] is a village in the administrative district of Gmina Chęciny, within Kielce County, Świętokrzyskie Voivodeship, in south-central Poland. It lies approximately 5 km (3 mi) south of Chęciny and 18 km (11 mi) south-west of the regional capital Kielce.

In Tokarnia there is an open-air Kielce Countryside Museum (Muzeum Wsi Kieleckiej - Park Etnograficzny w Tokarni), with examples of old countryside architecture. The museum is situated just by the European route E77 (Kielce-Kraków part).
