= Dziekanowice, Greater Poland Voivodeship =

Dziekanowice
- Village
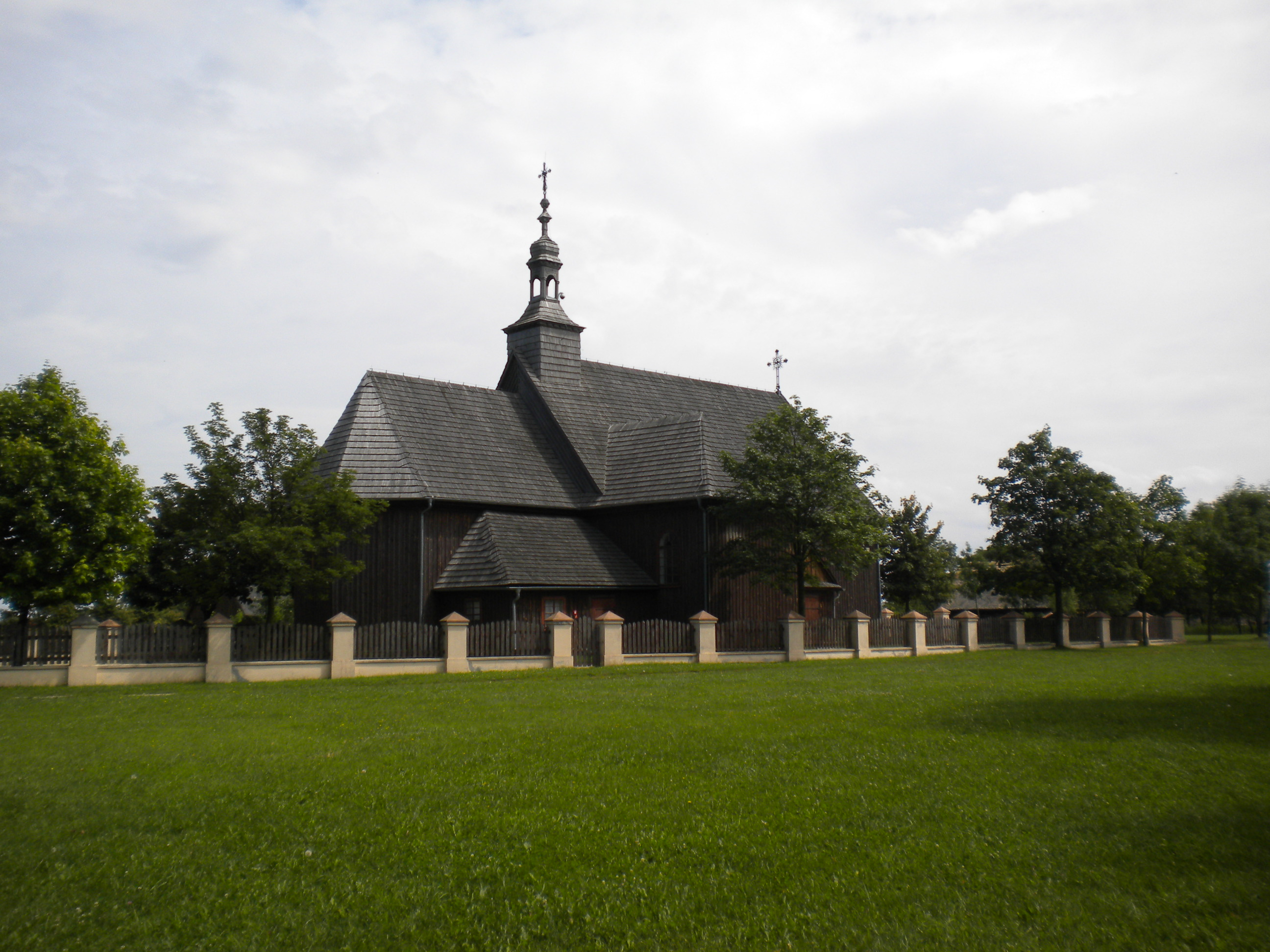
- Church of Saints Anne and Lawrence in Greater Poland Ethnographic Park in Dziekanowice

- Location within Poland
- Coordinates: 52°31′N 17°23′E
- Country: Poland
- Voivodeship: Greater Poland
- County: Gniezno
- Gmina: Łubowo

Dziekanowice [d͡ʑɛkanɔˈvit͡sɛ] is a village in the administrative district of Gmina Łubowo, within Gniezno County, Greater Poland Voivodeship, in west-central Poland.
