= Lednogóra =

- Village
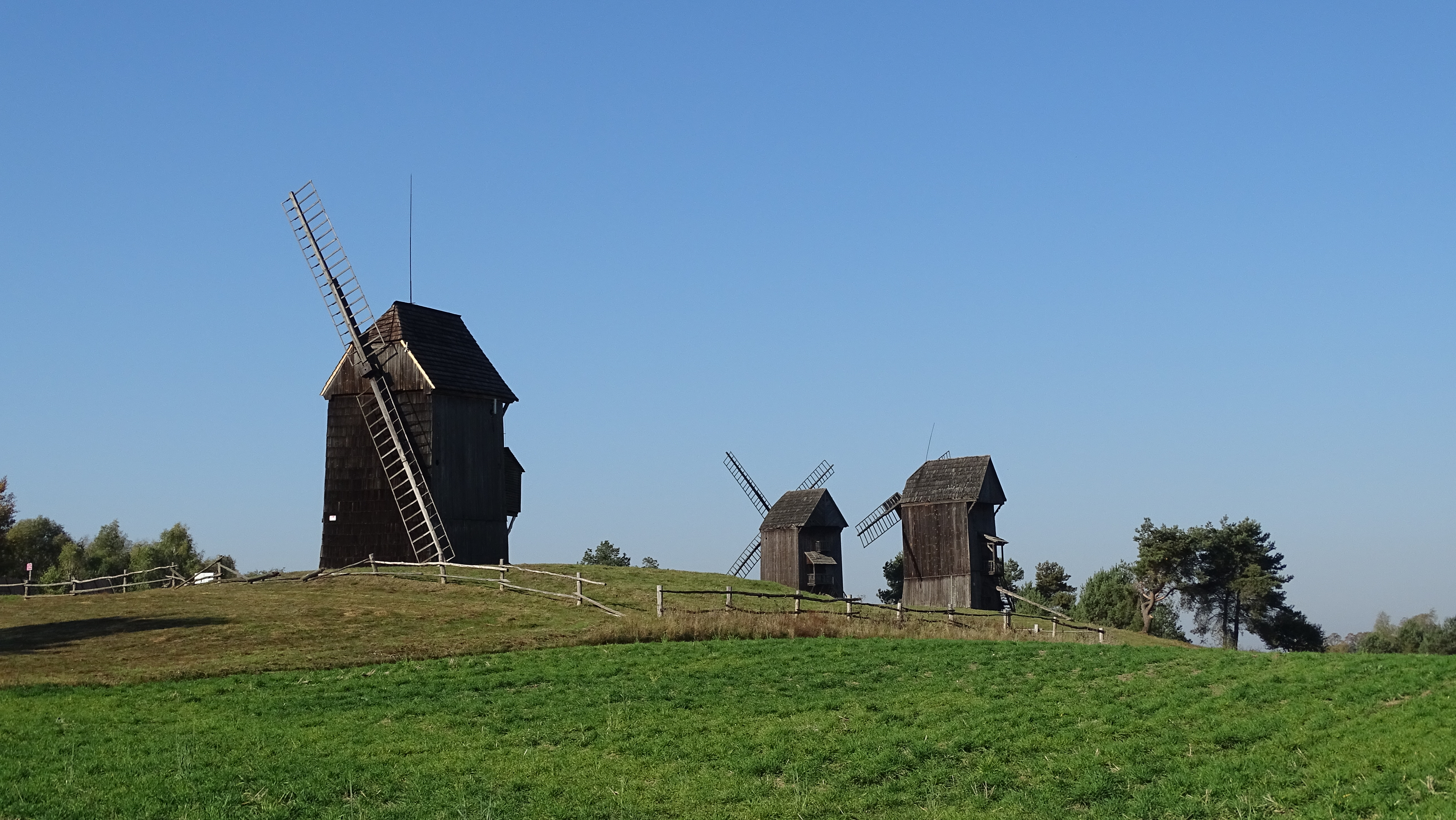
- A group of windmills from the 19th century

- Location within Poland
- Coordinates: 52°30′N 17°22′E
- Country: Poland
- Voivodeship: Greater Poland
- County: Gniezno
- Gmina: Łubowo
- Website: http://www.lednogora.pl

Lednogóra [lɛdnɔˈɡura] is a village in the administrative district of Gmina Łubowo, within Gniezno County, Greater Poland Voivodeship, in west-central Poland.
