= Przemęt Landscape Park =

Polish protected area

- Przemęcki Park Krajobrazowy
- IUCN category V (protected landscape/seascape)
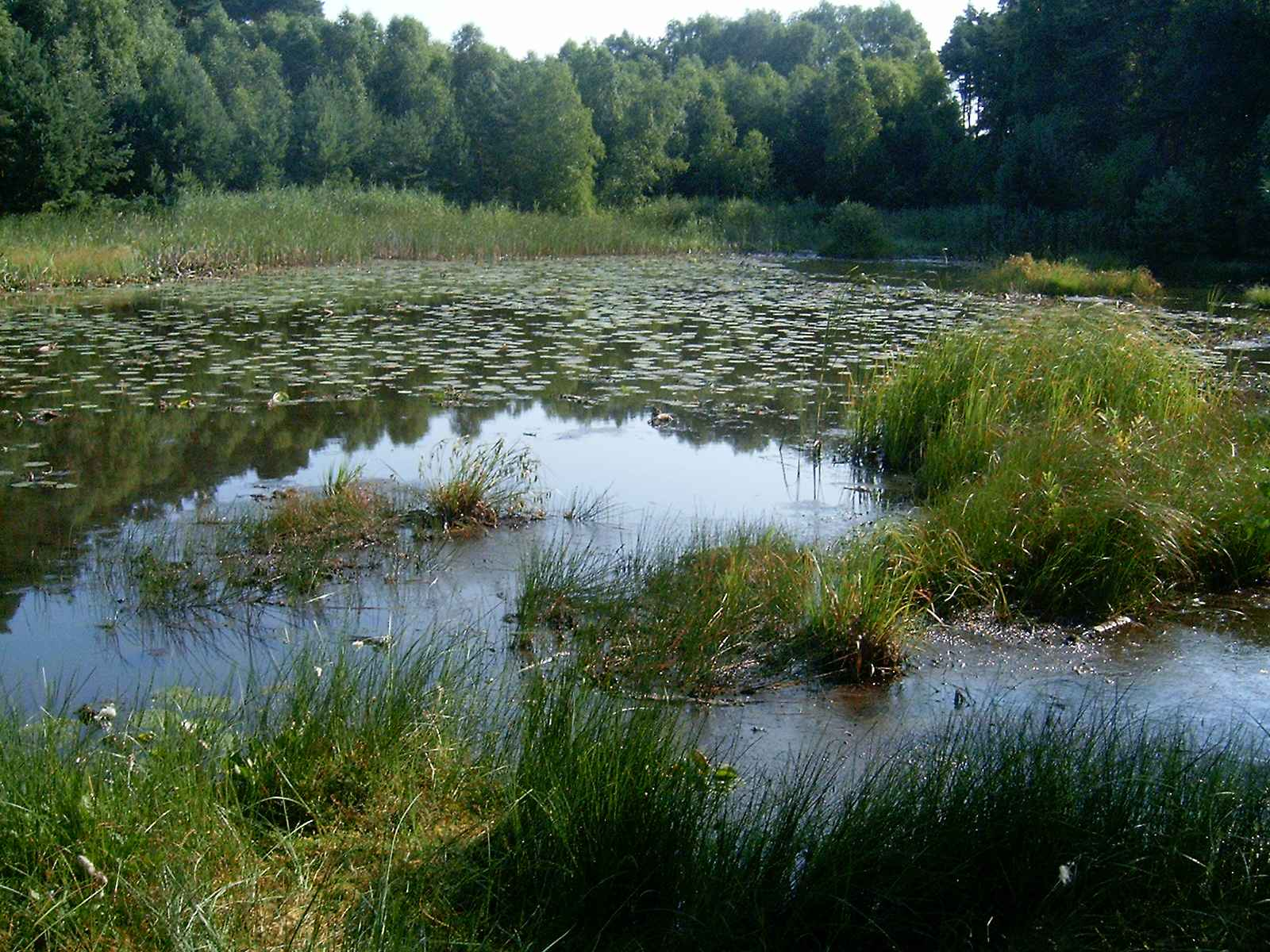
- Interactive map of Przemęt Landscape Park
- Location: west Poland
- Coordinates: 51°57′N 16°18′E
- Area: 214.50 km^{2} (82.82 sq mi)
- Established: 1991

Przemęt Landscape Park (Przemęcki Park Krajobrazowy) is a protected area (Landscape Park) in western Poland, established in 1991, covering an area of 214.50 square kilometres (82.82 sq mi).

The Park is shared between two voivodeships: Lubusz Voivodeship and Greater Poland Voivodeship. Within Lubusz Voivodeship it lies in Wschowa County (Gmina Wschowa). Within Greater Poland Voivodeship it lies in Leszno County (Gmina Wijewo, Gmina Włoszakowice) and Wolsztyn County (Gmina Przemęt).

Within the Landscape Park are four nature reserves.

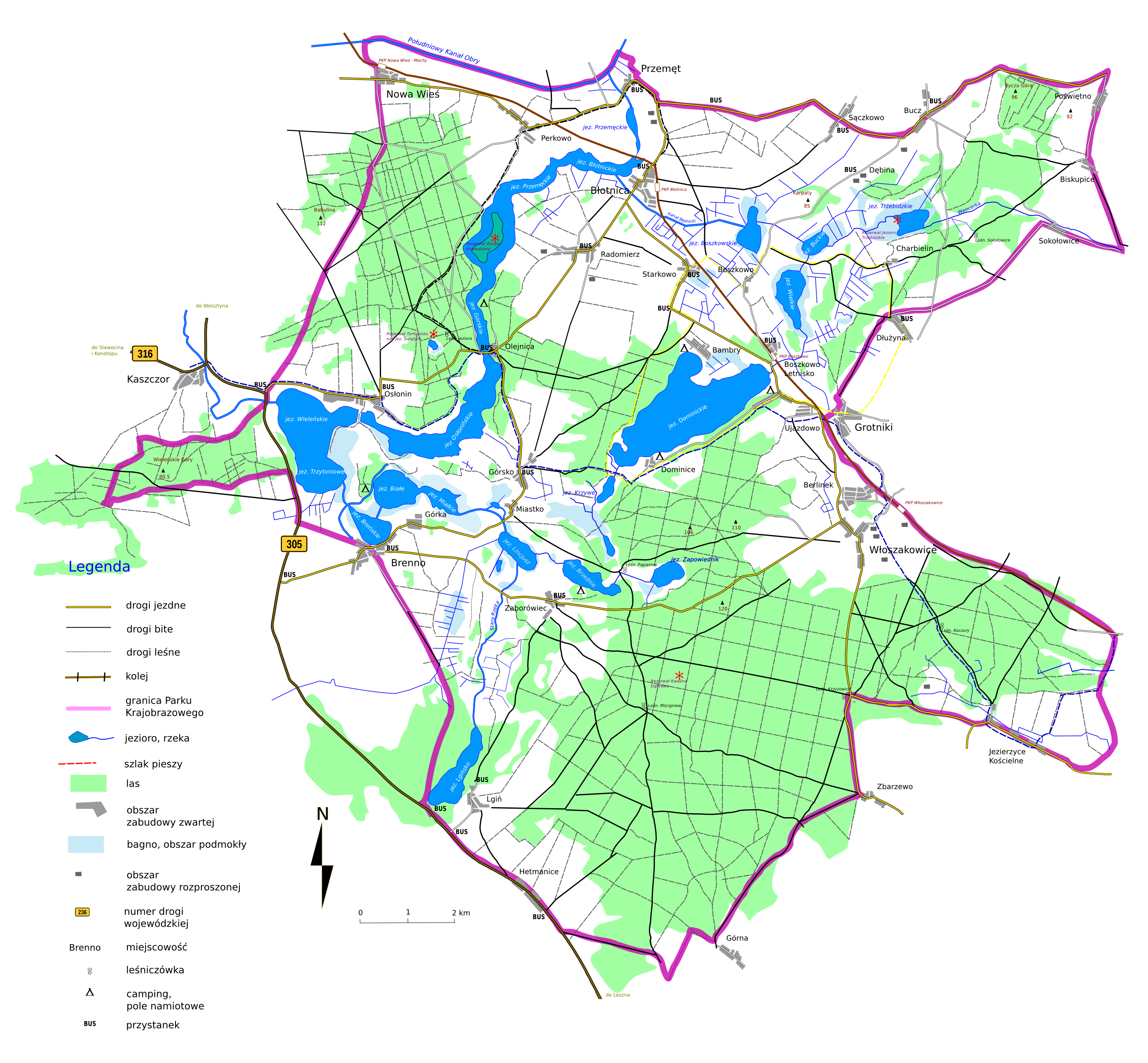
Map of the Park

== See also ==
- 1991 in the environment
