= San Pedro Department, Jujuy =

San Pedro Departamento San Pedro
- Department
- Interactive map of San Pedro
- Country: Argentina
- Seat: San Pedro de Jujuy

Area
  - Total: 2,150 km^{2} (830 sq mi)

Population (2022)
  - Total: 88,241
  - Density: 41.0/km^{2} (106/sq mi)

San Pedro is a department of Jujuy Province (Argentina).

== Towns ==
- La Esperanza
