= Solec, Wolsztyn County =

Solec
- Village
- Location within Poland
- Coordinates: 52°3′N 16°10′E
- Country: Poland
- Voivodeship: Greater Poland
- County: Wolsztyn
- Gmina: Przemęt
- Population: 645

Solec [ˈsɔlɛt͡s] is a village in the administrative district of Gmina Przemęt, within Wolsztyn County, Greater Poland Voivodeship, in west-central Poland.
