= New Zealand Forest Accord =

Environmental protection agreement for forestry in New Zealand

The New Zealand Forest Accord is an accord among forestry associations and environmental groups that was signed in 1991.

== Signatories ==
- New Zealand Forest Owners' Association
- New Zealand Timber Industry Federation
- New Zealand Farm Forestry Association
- New Zealand Wood Panels Manufacturing Association
- Royal Forest and Bird Protection Society of New Zealand
- Environment and Conservation Organisations of Aotearoa New Zealand
- Federated Mountain Clubs
- Friends of the Earth
- Beech Action Committee
- Pacific Institute of Resource Management
- World Wildlife Fund (New Zealand)
- Japan Tropical Forest Action Network
- Tropical Forest Action Group
- Maruia Society

== See also ==
- Forestry in New Zealand
