= Filicide =

Deliberate act of a parent killing their own child

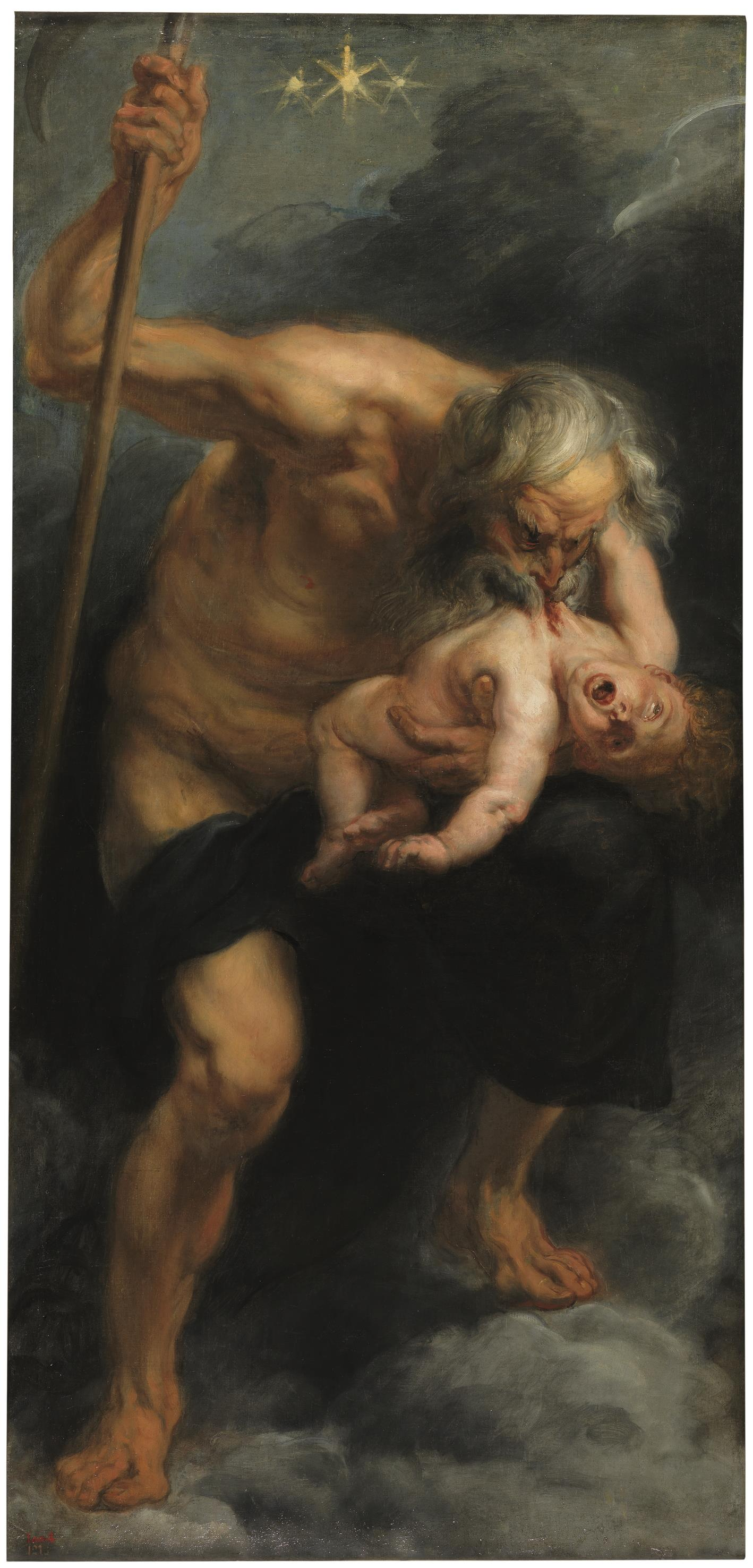
Painting by Peter Paul Rubens of Cronus devouring one of his children

Filicide is the deliberate act of a parent killing their own child. The word filicide is derived from the Latin words filius and filia ('son' and 'daughter') and the suffix -cide, from the word caedere meaning 'to kill'. The word can refer to both the crime and perpetrator of the crime.

== Statistics ==
Males are primarily responsible for pediatric homicides of all age groups; more than 90% of adolescent homicides of male, female, Black, and White victims were committed by males. Parents were responsible for 61% of child murders under the age of five. Sometimes, there is a combination of murder and suicide in filicide cases. On average, according to FBI statistics, 450 children are murdered by their parents each year in the United States.

An in-depth longitudinal study of 297 cases convicted of filicide and 45 of filicide-suicide in the United Kingdom between 1997 and 2006 showed that 37% of the perpetrators had a recorded mental illness at the time. The most common diagnoses were mood disorders and personality disorders rather than psychosis, but the latter accounted for 15% of cases. However – similar to findings in a large Danish study – the majority had not had contact with mental health services prior to the murders, and few had received treatment. Female perpetrators were more likely to have given birth as teenagers. Fathers were more likely to have been convicted of violent offences and have a history of substance misuse, and were more likely to kill multiple victims. Infants were more likely to be victims than older children, and a link to post-partum depression was suggested.

== Types of filicide ==
Dr. Phillip Resnick published research on filicide in 1969 and stated that there were five main motives for filicide, including "altruistic", "fatal maltreatment", "unwanted child", "acutely psychotic" and "spousal revenge".

"Altruistic" killings occur because the parent believes that the world is too cruel for the child, or because the child is enduring suffering (whether this is actually occurring or not).

In fatal maltreatment killings, the goal is not always to kill the child, but death may occur anyway, and Munchausen syndrome by proxy is in that category.

Spousal revenge killings are killings of children done to indirectly harm a domestic partner; they do not frequently occur. Glen Carruthers, author of "Making sense of spousal revenge filicide", argued that those who engage in spousal revenge killings see their own children as objects.

== Children at risk ==
In 2013, in the United States, homicide was in the top five causes of deaths of children, and in the top three causes of death in children between 1 and 4 years old.

A direct correlation has been identified between child abuse rates and child homicide rates. Research suggests that children murdered by their parents were physically abused by them prior to their deaths.

In South Asia and the Middle East, many homicide cases were due to parents killing their children after being accused of violating the family's reputation; daughters were most likely to be murdered in these killings.

== Notable examples ==
Victim(s)	Perpetrator(s)	Relation of parent to child(ren)	Date	Location	Notes
Titus and Tiberius Junius Brutus	Lucius Junius Brutus	Father	509 BC	Roman Republic	Lucius Junius Brutus, who is usually credited with overthrowing the final King of Rome Lucius Tarquinius Superbus and establishing the Roman Republic, executed his sons Titus and Tiberius when they were implicated in a plot to restore the monarchy.
Son of Aulus Postumius Tubertus	Aulus Postumius Tubertus	Father	431 BC	Roman Republic	There is a story that Aulus Postumius Tubertus, who served as dictator in the year 431 BC, had his son put to death when he abandoned a post assigned to him in order to attack the enemy. The account is doubted by Roman historian Livy, due to similarities to stories about the family of Titus Manlius Imperiosus Torquatus (see below).
Son of Titus Manlius Imperiosus Torquatus	Titus Manlius Imperiosus Torquatus	Father	340 BC	Latium, Italian Peninsula, Roman Republic	During the Latin War, Roman consul Titus Manlius Imperiosus Torquatus executed his own son after he left his post in order to attack a group of Latins, leading to a reputation in his family for extreme discipline.
Decimus Junius Silanus Manlianus	Titus Manlius Torquatus	Father	140 BC	Roman Republic	While serving as Praetor in Macedonia, Decimus Junius Silanus Manlianus was accused of corruption by Macedonian envoys. His father Titus Manlius Torquatus, a senior Senator, was granted permission to privately try his son in his home. Despite knowing that the family code of honour would compel his son to commit suicide, Titus sentenced his son to banishment from his sight, causing Manlianus to take his own life. His severity was supposedly inspired by his descendance from the equally severe Titus Manlius Imperiosus Torquatus (see above).
Son of Quintus Fabius Maximus Eburnus	Quintus Fabius Maximus Eburnus	Father	c. 116 BC	Roman Republic	Quintus Fabius Maximus Eburnus, consul in 116 BC, condemned one of his sons to death for "immorality".
Jin Nong'er	Jin Midi	Father	121-87 BC	Western Han Empire	Jin Midi killed his own son Nong'er after the latter entered the imperial harem. This cemented the respect Jin Midi, by descent a Xiongnu prince, already had from Emperor Wu of Han; later Jin ascended to the rank of general of chariots and cavalry.
Alexander I and Aristobulus IV	Herod the Great	Father	7 BC	Herodian Kingdom of Judea	According to Josephus, King Herod of Judea had his sons Alexander and Aristobulus strangled because he feared they would usurp him.
Claudia Livia (Livilla)	Antonia Minor	Mother	31	Roman Empire	Livilla, along with her lover Sejanus, was accused of poisoning Drusus Julius Caesar, the son of Emperor Tiberius. According to historian Cassius Dio, Tiberius placed Livilla in the custody of her mother Antonia, who locked her up in a room where she was starved to death.
Aulus Vitellius Petronianus	Vitellius	Father	69	Roman Empire	Suetonius wrote that Vitellius was widely believed to have murdered his son in order to inherit the fortune of the boy's maternal grandparents. In this account, Vitellius claimed that his son had attempted parricide beforehand and killed himself out of shame.
Children of Liu Chen (Shu Han)	Liu Chen (Shu Han)	Father	December 263	Shu Han, Ancient China	It is recorded in the Records of the Three Kingdoms that Liu Chen killed himself and his family after the surrender of his father led to the fall of the Shu Han empire.
Crispus	Constantine the Great	Father	326	Pula, Istria, Roman Empire	For unclear reasons, Crispus was sentenced to death by his father Emperor Constantine the Great in 326 AD.
Constantine VI	Irene of Athens	Mother	c. 797 (before 805)	Byzantine Empire	Irene of Athens organised a conspiracy to have her son Constantine VI eliminated so she could become sole ruler of the Byzantine Empire. On 19 August 797, her supporters gouged out his eyes and had him imprisoned. He died sometime before 805, possibly as a result of his injuries.
Savcı Bey	Murad I	Father	c. 1373	Ottoman Empire	Convinced by Andronikos IV Palaiologos, son of John V Palaiologos, Savcı Bey rebelled against his father Murad I, Sultan of the Ottoman Empire, in an attempt to seize power. He was unsuccessful and his father had him executed.
Cristobal	Acxotécatl	Father	1527	Tlaxcala, New Spain	After Cristobal converted from the indigenous religion of his family to Catholicism, he started to destroy religious icons in his family home. This provoked his father Acxotécatl to viciously beat him – in an attempt to make him renounce his new faith – before he burnt his son to death over a fire. He is one of the Child Martyrs of Tlaxcala.
Şehzade Mustafa	Suleiman the Magnificent	Father	6 October 1553	Ereğli, Ottoman Empire	Suleiman I, Sultan of the Ottoman Empire, ordered the death of his son Şehzade Mustafa after mistakenly believing that he was conspiring against him. The responsibility for this is usually placed on Rüstem Pasha.
Tsarevich Ivan Ivanovich	Ivan the Terrible	Father	19 November 1581	Alexandrov Kremlin, Tsardom of Russia	Although exact details are unconfirmed, it is believed that Ivan Ivanovich confronted his father Tsar Ivan IV Vasilyevich (Ivan the Terrible) after his pregnant wife Yelena Sheremeteva was physically assaulted by him, which possibly caused her to subsequently miscarry. The confrontation led to an argument, during which Tsar Ivan became enraged and hit his son over the head with a sceptre, an injury which he died from a few days later. Tsar Ivan felt great regret following the act, and his grief is famously depicted in Ilya Repin's painting, Ivan the Terrible and His Son Ivan.
Mohammad Baqer Mirza	Abbas the Great	Father	1615	Rasht, Safavid Iran	After starting to believe that his son Mohammad Baqer Mirza was planning to overthrow him, Abbas the Great ordered Behbud Khan Cherkes to murder him in a hammam in the city of Resht. He immediately regretted the decision and was plunged into despair.
Tsarevich Alexei Petrovich of Russia	Peter the Great	Father	26 June 1718	Petropavlovskaya fortress, Empire of Russia	Alexei was suspected of being involved in a plot to overthrow his father, Tsar Peter I of Russia, who had him tortured into making a confession – possibly taking part personally. Alexei was convicted and sentenced to death, but died of his injuries before the execution could be carried out, most likely due to him having received over forty lashes with a knout.
Crown Prince Sado	Yeongjo of Joseon	Father	1762	Seoul, Joseon Dynasty	After being estranged by his father, he got depression and PTSD. He was closed into a closet for a week and died due to starvation.
Gracie, Alice, Mabel, and Willis	Mary Cowan	Mother	1884–1894	Maine, United States	After getting away with the murder of her first husband and their three children, then her second husband, Mary Cowan poisoned her third husband and their son with arsenic. The husband survived and she was sentenced to life imprisonment.
Ponciano and Feliza Rojas	Francisca Rojas	Mother	29 June 1892	Necochea, Buenos Aires Province, Argentina	In 1892, Francisca Rojas murdered her two children and attempted to blame her neighbour, her motive being to appease a man who was reluctant to marry her due to her "two brats". When presented with evidence against her, she broke down and confessed. She is believed to be the first criminal in the world to be convicted with fingerprint evidence.
Harry Fragson	Victor Pot	Father	31 December 1913	56 Rue La Fayette, Paris, France	On 31 December 1913, British music hall star Harry Fragson returned to his home in Paris to discover his mentally ill father Victor Pot about to commit suicide. There was an argument that led to Victor fatally shooting his son. Victor then died six weeks later in an asylum.
The Goebbels children	Joseph and Magda Goebbels	Father and mother	1 May 1945	Führerbunker, Berlin, Nazi Germany	As it became clear to them that Germany was going to lose the Second World War, Nazi Propaganda Minister Joseph Goebbels and his wife Magda made the decision to kill themselves and their children, rather than succumb to capture by the advancing Russian Army. SS dentist Sturmbannführer Helmut Kunz injected the children with morphine, after which Magda and SS-Obersturmbannführer Ludwig Stumpfegger (Adolf Hitler's personal doctor) crushed ampules of cyanide in their mouths.
Gennady Motsny	Anatoly Motsny	Father	31 March 1952	Soviet Union	Anatoly Motsny, veteran of the Eastern Front during World War II, former Senior Lieutenant in the Red Army, and former Hero of the Soviet Union, was stripped of all titles and awards after he murdered his five-year-old son.
Kimberly and Kristen MacDonald	Jeffrey R. MacDonald	Father	17 February 1970	Fort Bragg, North Carolina, United States	In the early hours of the morning on 17 February 1970, Colette Stevenson and her two children were bludgeoned to death in their home at Fort Bragg. Her husband and father of her children, US Army physician Jeffrey R. MacDonald, was present at the scene and claimed that three intruders had broken into the house and attacked them in a manner which resembled the Manson Family murders. Evidence suggested that the story was fabricated and he was charged with the murders in 1979, after nearly a decade of legal proceedings.
Patricia, Frederick, and John List	John List	Father	9 November 1971	Westfield, New Jersey, United States	On 9 November 1971, John List murdered his mother, wife, and three children. He then assumed a new identity and disappeared. He was apprehended over seventeen years later in June 1989 after being featured in an episode of America's Most Wanted.
Cheryl Downs	Diane Downs	Mother	19 May 1983	Springfield, Oregon, United States	Diane Downs shot her three children and drove them to McKenzie-Willamette Medical Center, where she claimed that the shootings had happened during an attempted carjacking. Cheryl (aged seven) was dead upon arrival and the other two children, Danny (aged three) and Christie (aged eight), suffered serious injuries. Hospital staff found Diane's behaviour suspicious and forensic evidence did not match her statements to police. She was charged with murder and two counts of attempted murder and assault and sentenced to life in prison.
Marvin Gaye	Marvin Gay Sr.	Father	1 April 1984	Los Angeles, California, United States	During an argument, American musician Marvin Gaye was shot and killed by his father Marvin Gay, Sr. at their home in Arlington Heights.
Judith Barsi	József Barsi	Father	25 July 1988	Los Angeles, California, United States	Child actress Judith Barsi was killed in a murder-suicide by her abusive, alcoholic father in a fit of rage after learning that his wife was leaving him.
Ulrich Luthe	Claus Luthe	Father	13 April 1990	Munich, Germany	Famed German car designer Claus Luthe fatally stabbed his 33-year-old son following an argument. His career at BMW abruptly ended, Luthe was convicted of manslaughter and sentenced to 33 months in prison.
Michael and Alexander Smith	Susan Smith	Mother	October 1994	John D. Long Lake, South Carolina, United States	On 25 October 1994, Susan Smith reported to police that she had been carjacked by a black man while her children were still inside the vehicle. However, on 3 November she confessed to letting her car roll into John D. Long Lake.
Koua Eai, Samson, Nali, Tang Lung, A-ee, and Tang Kee Hang,	Khoua Her	Mother	September 3, 1998	Saint Paul, Minnesota, United States	Depressed over her responsibilities, Khoua Her strangled all six of her children before attempting to commit suicide. She survived and faced a trial. She instead plead guilty and was sentenced to 50 years imprisonment. It is considered one of the worst cases of filicide in American history.
Robert, Jr. and Britney Fisher	Robert William Fisher	Father	10 April 2001	Scottsdale, Arizona, United States	On 10 April 2001, the Fisher family home exploded. The bodies of Mary Fisher and her two children were found inside the remains; their throats had been slit and Mary had been shot in the back of the head. Husband and father Robert William Fisher had a history of cruel and controlling behaviour and is the only suspect in the case. His current whereabouts are unknown (as of November 2022).
Noah, John, Paul, Luke, and Mary Yates	Andrea Yates	Mother	20 June 2001	Houston, Texas, United States	While suffering from severe postpartum depression, postpartum psychosis, and schizophrenia, Andrea Yates drowned her five children in their bathtub on 20 June 2001. She was sentenced to life imprisonment before being found not guilty by reason of insanity, after which she was moved to the North Texas State Hospital, a high-security mental health facility.
Unnamed baby girl	Romina Tejerina	Mother	23 February 2003	San Pedro de Jujuy, Jujuy Province, Argentina	After dealing with severe mental health problems during the pregnancy, which Tejerina said was the result of rape, she stabbed to death the newborn girl with a knitting needle moments after giving birth in her impoverished home. Tejerina became a paramount case for Argentina's feminist movement and the debate over abortion in the country. Tejerina was sentenced to 14 years in prison for the murder, but was released early on parole in 2012.
Margaret Schlosser	Dena Schlosser	Mother	22 November 2004	Plano, Texas, United States	Dena Schlosser was diagnosed with hydrocephalus at the age of eight and suffered from a variety of mental health problems throughout her life. During an episode described as a "religious frenzy", she amputated the arms of her eleven-month-old daughter, Margaret, who died as a result. She was committed to the North Texas State Hospital, where she became a roommate of Andrea Yates (see above).
Jai, Tyler and Bailey Farquharson	Robert Farquharson	Father	4 September 2005	Victoria, Australia	Robert Farquharson, who was separated from his wife, drove off a highway and into a water-filled quarry. He escaped and his three sons drowned. He claimed the crash was caused by a medical event. After two trials he was convicted of murder and sentenced to life imprisonment with a minimum of 33 years.
Bobby Äikiä	Niina Äikiä	Mother	14 January 2006	Nässjö, Sweden	Niina Äikiä and her boyfriend Eddy Larsson began to torture her intellectually disabled son Bobby in late 2005, which culminated in his death the following year.
Daniel Benoit	Chris Benoit	Father	23 June 2007	Fayetteville, Georgia, United States	Over a of period of three days beginning on 22 June 2007, Canadian professional wrestler Chris Benoit murdered his wife Nancy and their seven-year-old child Daniel, before killing himself. It was determined that Daniel had been sedated with Xanax before being asphyxiated.
Mitchell Moore	Marie Lynn Moore	Mother	5 April 2009	Casselberry, Florida, United States	On 5 April 2009 at a Shoot Straight gun range, Marie Lynn Moore, a mentally ill woman who believed she had to save her son Mitchell from hell, shot and killed him point-blank in the back of the head during shooting practice before committing suicide. The killing, which was caught on tape, sparked controversy due to Marie accessing a firearm after having been subjected to a previous involuntary commitment under the Baker Act.
David, Eliška, Lukáš, and Romana	Romana Zienertová	Mother	September 2, 2011	Široký Důl, Czech Republic	Romana Zienertová murdered her four children by slashing her youngest three before suffocating her eldest son. She tried to commit suicide but survived it. She was sentenced to life imprisonment.
Charles and Braden Powell	Joshua Powell	Father	5 February 2012	South Hill, Washington, United States	After Joshua Powell was named a person of interest in the investigation into the disappearance of his wife Susan, custody of their two children was awarded to Susan's parents. This led to Joshua blowing up his house with him and the children inside in an apparent murder-suicide.
Daniel Pełka	Magdalena Łuczak	Mother	3 March 2012	Coventry, England, United Kingdom	Daniel Pełka was severely abused by his mother Magdalena Łuczak along with her new partner Mariusz Krężołek until it resulted in his death in March 2012. The extent of Daniel's injuries and failure of social services to identify him as a victim of child abuse caused a shock in the UK media. Magdalena and Mariusz were jailed for life and both later died in prison.
Lama al-Ghamdi	Fayhan al-Ghamdi	Father	October 2012	Saudi Arabia	Five-year-old Lama al-Ghamdi died in hospital after being severely beaten and raped by her father Fayhan al-Ghamdi. Her injuries included a crushed skull, a broken arm, and broken ribs. Fayham was sentenced to eight years in prison and eight hundred lashes, although this was reduced to three years. He was also ordered to pay a sum equivalent to $267,000 in blood money to Lama's mother.
Children of Jaime Iván Martínez	Jaime Iván Martínez	Father	November 2015	Antioquia, Colombia	Jaime Iván Martínez is a Colombian serial killer who murdered somewhere between twenty and twenty-five people, including his wife and two children (aged five and seven).
Paul Murdaugh	Alex Murdaugh	Father	7 June 2021	Colleton County, South Carolina, United States	Disbarred South Carolina attorney Alex Murdaugh was convicted of murdering his wife Maggie, 52, and son Paul, 22, on the evening of June 7, 2021. Prosecutors argued that Alex Murdaugh's financial crimes, opioid addiction, and other misdeeds were soon to be made public, which motivated Murdaugh to gain sympathy while keeping his secrets from being revealed. Murdaugh's conviction was overturned on May 13, 2026.
Liané, Maya and Karla Dickason	Lauren Dickason	Mother	16 September 2021	Timaru, New Zealand	Lauren Dickason, a South African doctor, murdered her three daughters three weeks after immigrating to New Zealand. After admitting to killing her children, she went on trial pleading insanity or infanticide. She was found guilty of murder and sentenced to 18 years in prison.
Lacey Fletcher	Sheila and Clay Fletcher	Parents	3 January 2022	Slaughter, Louisiana, United States	36-year-old Lacey Fletcher died of neglect by her parents after suffering cognitive decline 12 years previously. Lacey was left to die on her parents couch in her own excrement after her parents abandoned her.
Jailyn Candelario	Kristel Candelario	Mother	June 2023	Cleveland, Ohio	16-month-old Jailyn Candelario died of starvation after her mother abandoned her for 10 days in their apartment to travel to Puerto Rico and Detroit on vacation.
Four children	Dennis Aroma	Father	28 December 2025	Commewijne District, Suriname	43-year-old Dennis Aroma killed nine people, including four of his five children, by stabbing them multiple times. He killed himself the next day while in police custody.

== Gallery ==
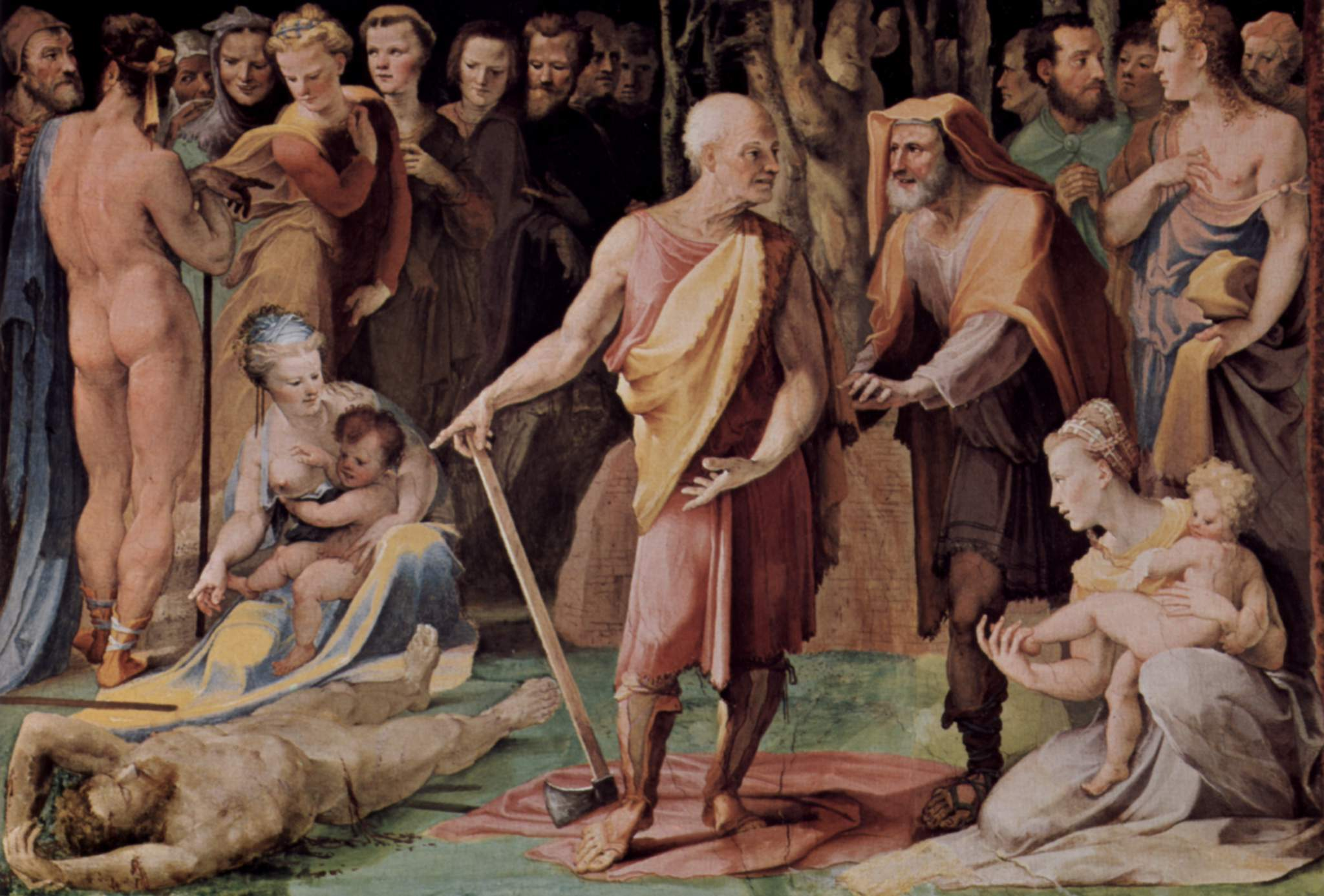
Postumius kills his son for betraying his orders by Domenico Beccafumi

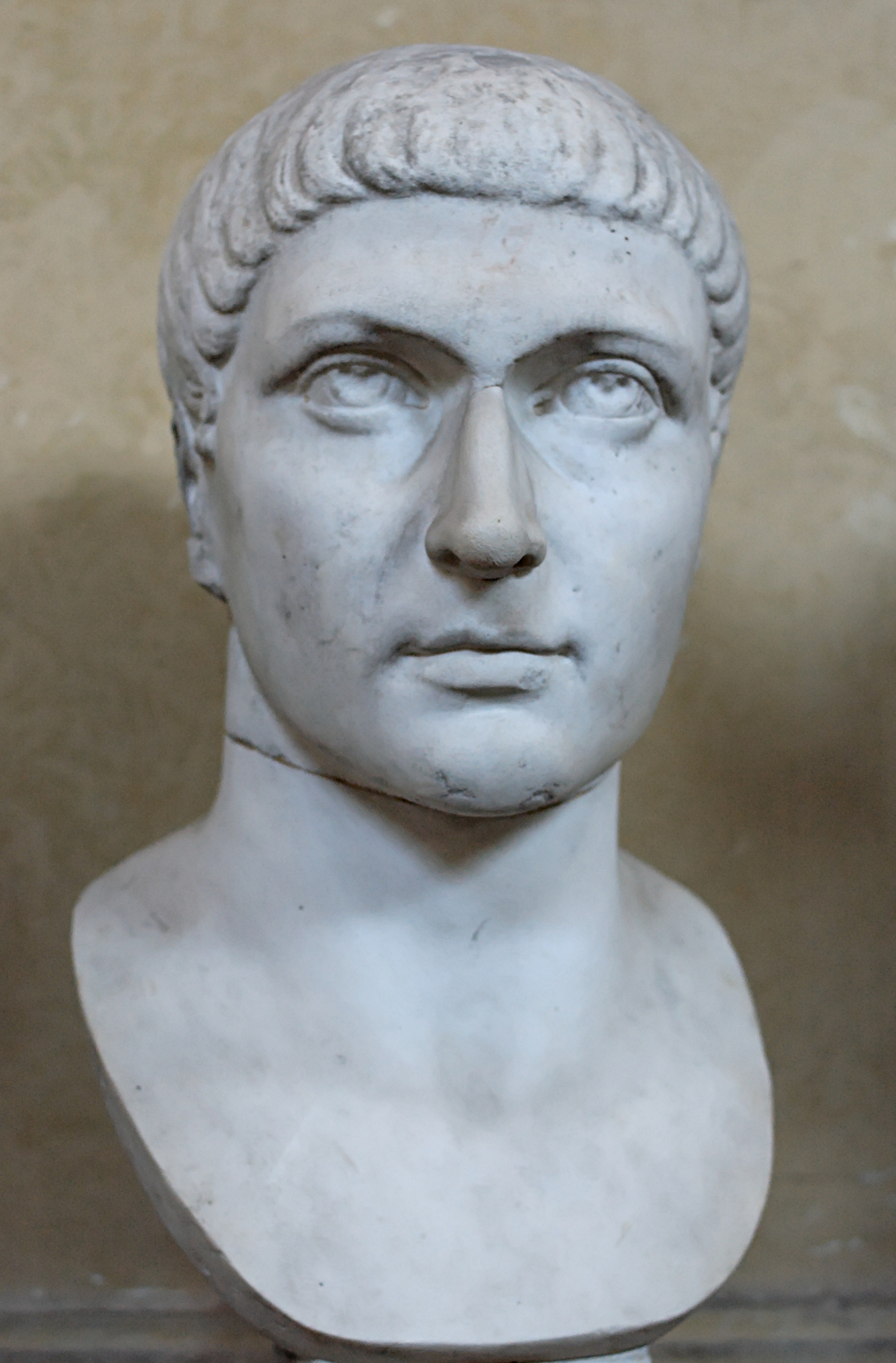
Constantine the Great, who executed his son for unknown reasons

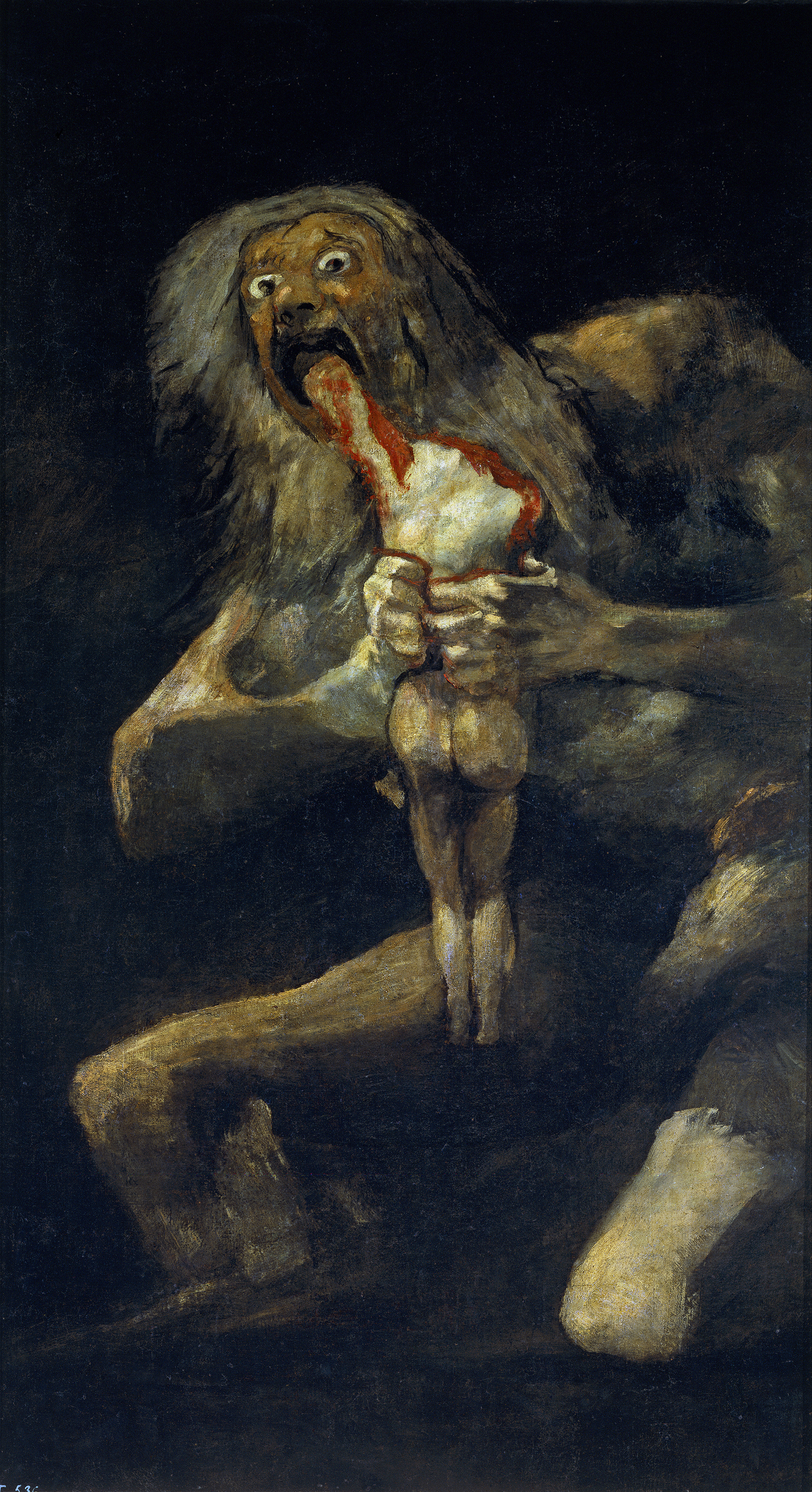
Saturn Devouring His Son, by Francisco de Goya

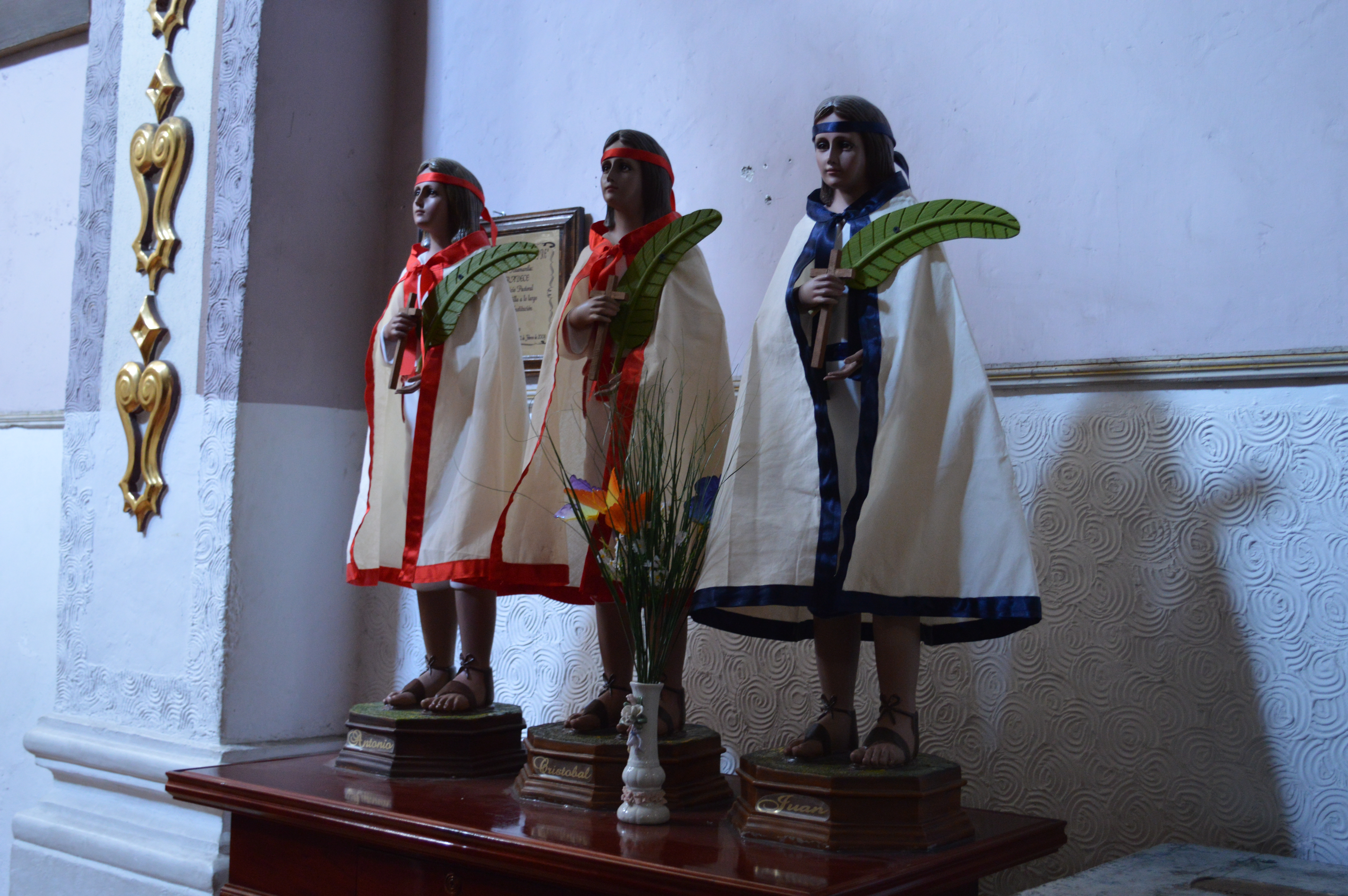
Cristobal (centre) was murdered by his father and is one of the Child Martyrs of Tlaxcala, who were canonization as saints by Pope Francis in 2017.

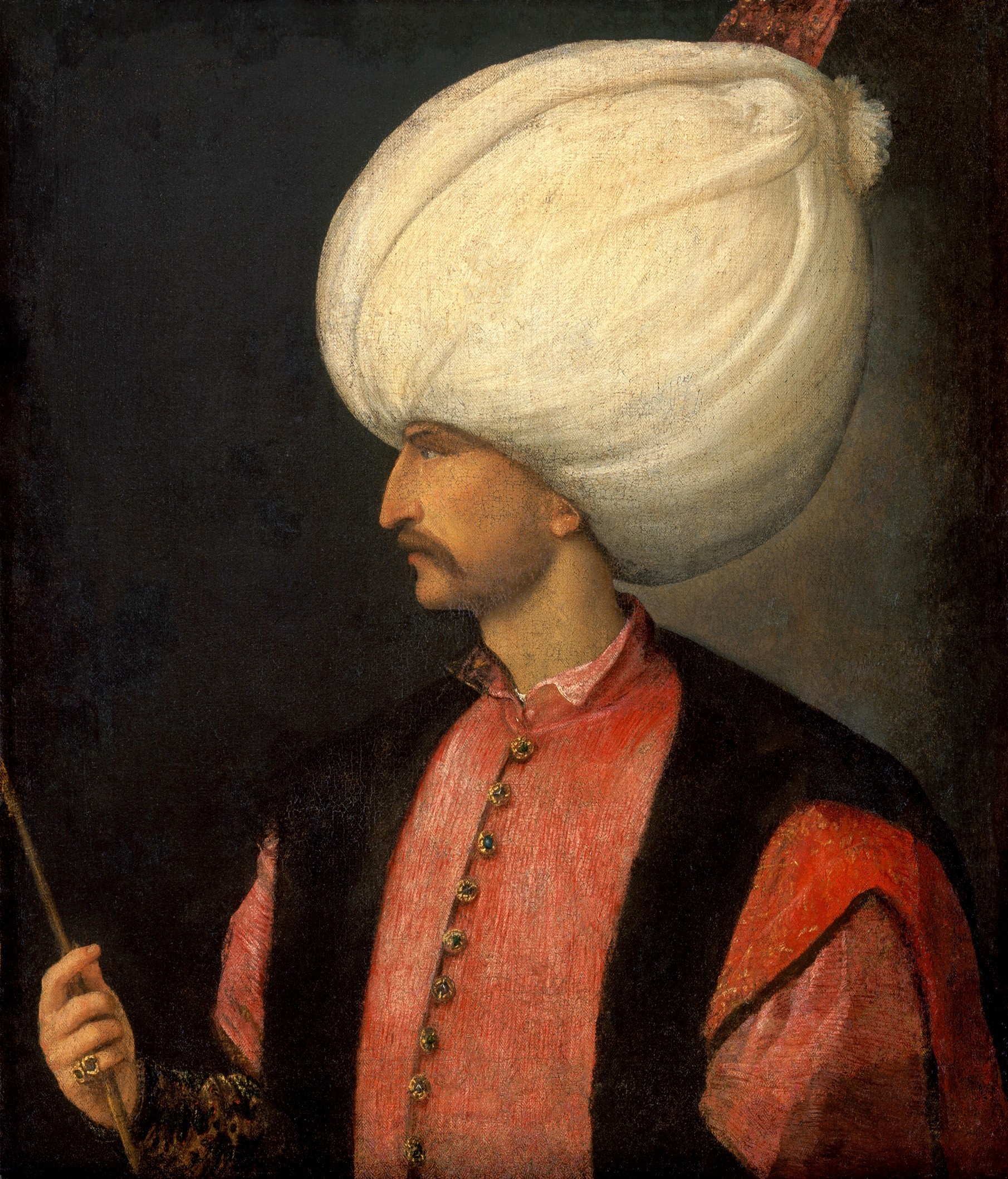
Suleiman the Magnificent had his son executed

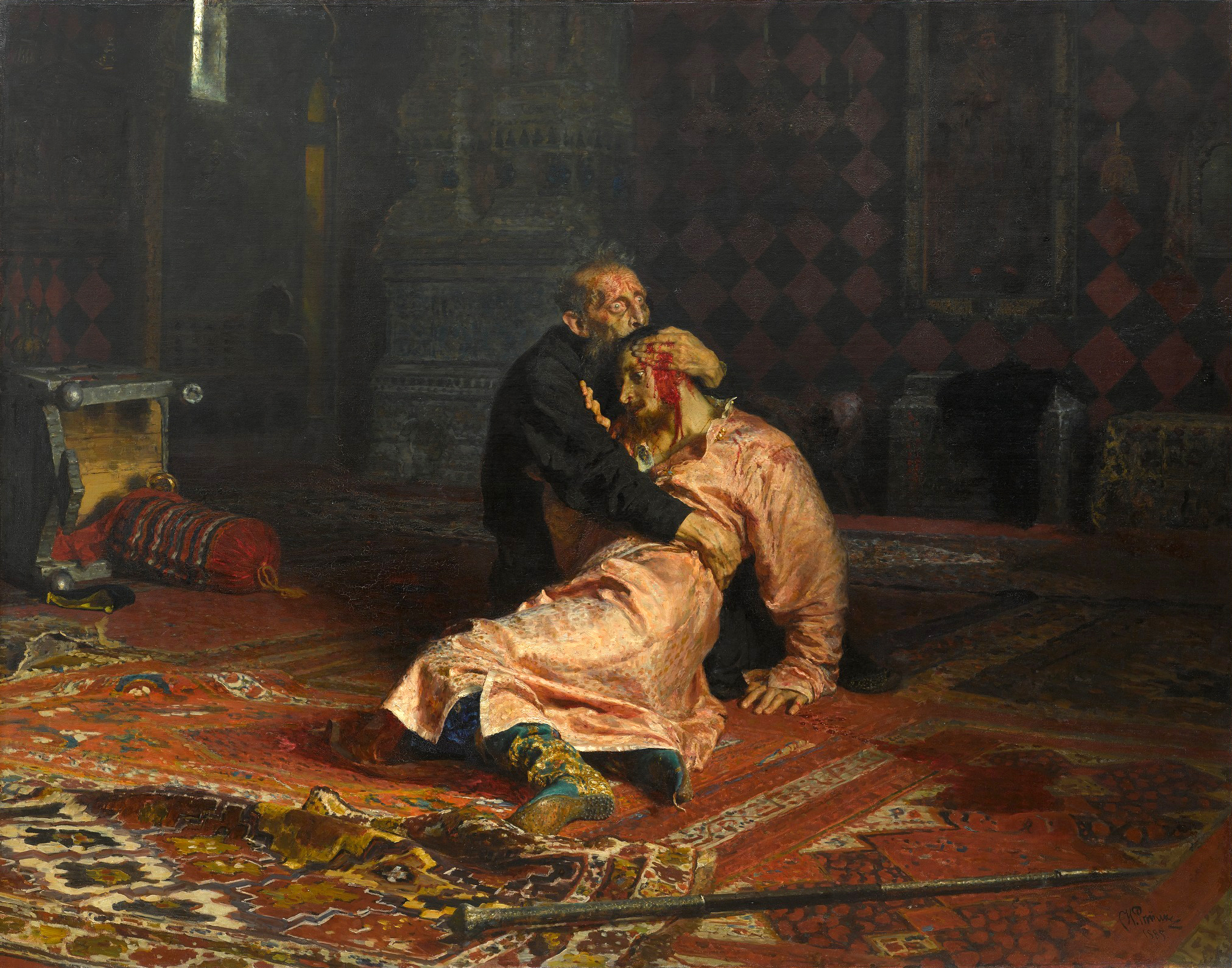
Ivan the Terrible and His Son Ivan, by Ilya Yefimovich Repin

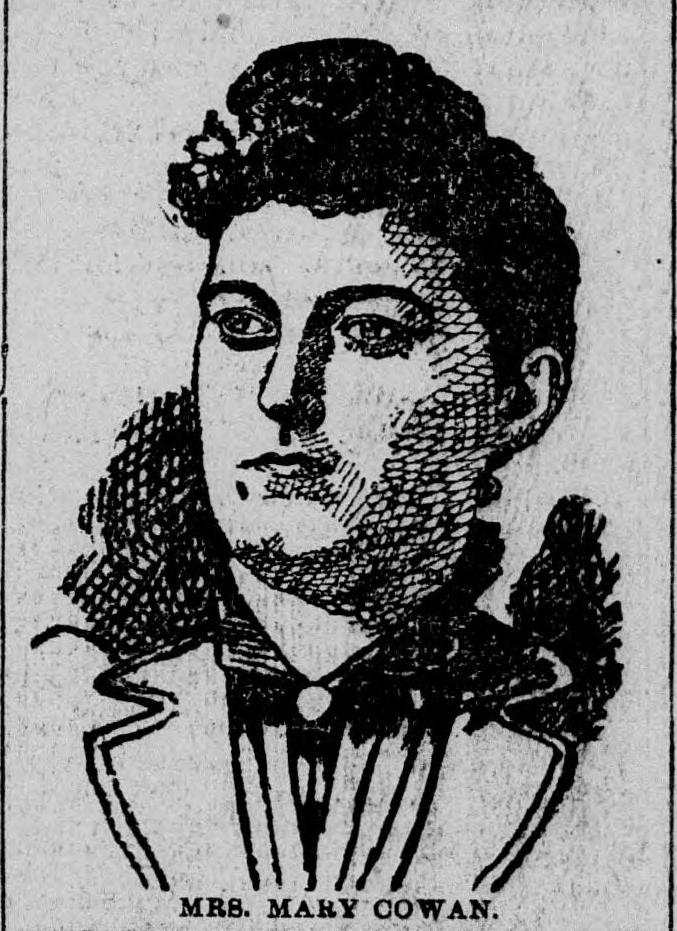
Mary Cowan, who murdered her children

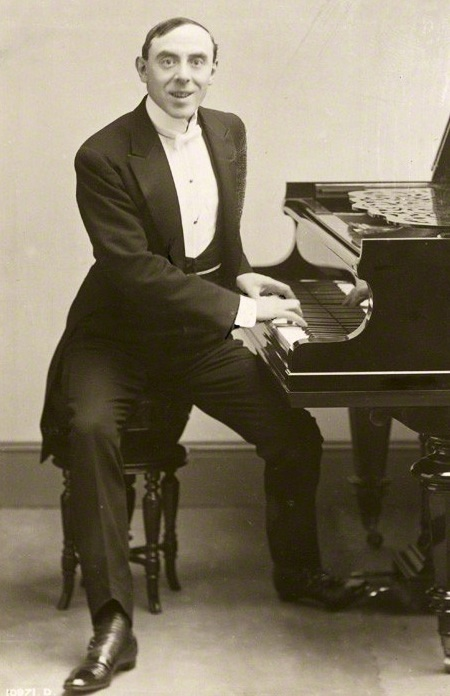
British Music hall star Harry Fragson, who was fatally shot by his father in Paris in 1913

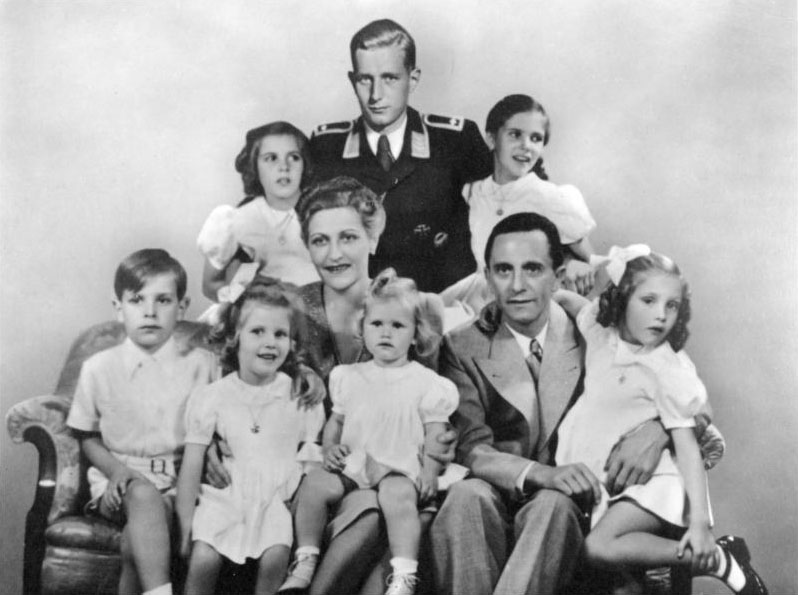
Joseph and Magda Goebbels with their children. They would murder them at the end of World War II in Europe, with the exception of Harald Quandt (in uniform), Magda's son from a previous marriage.

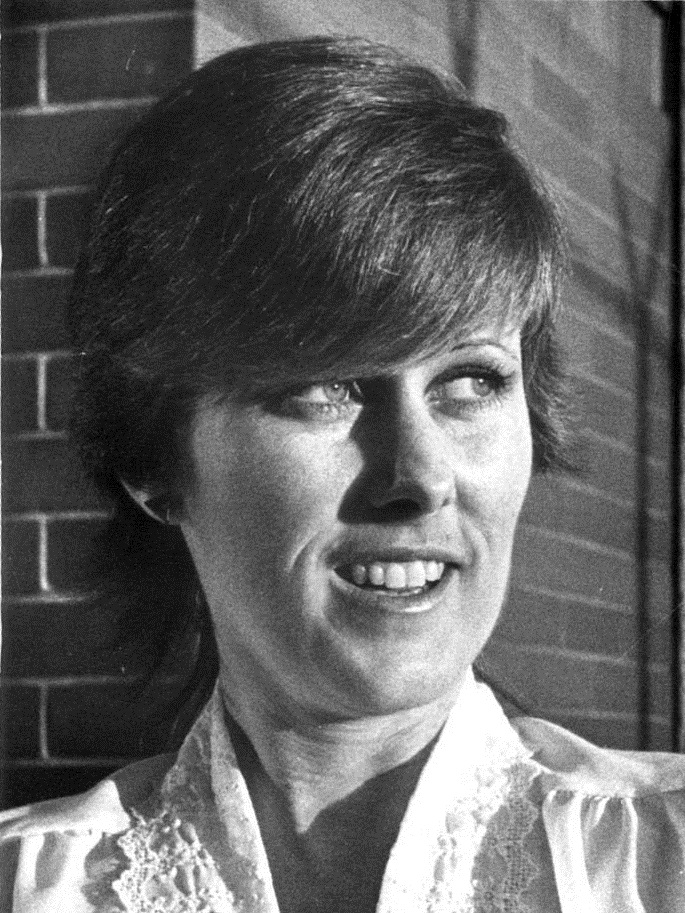
Diane Downs, who shot her three children, killing one of them

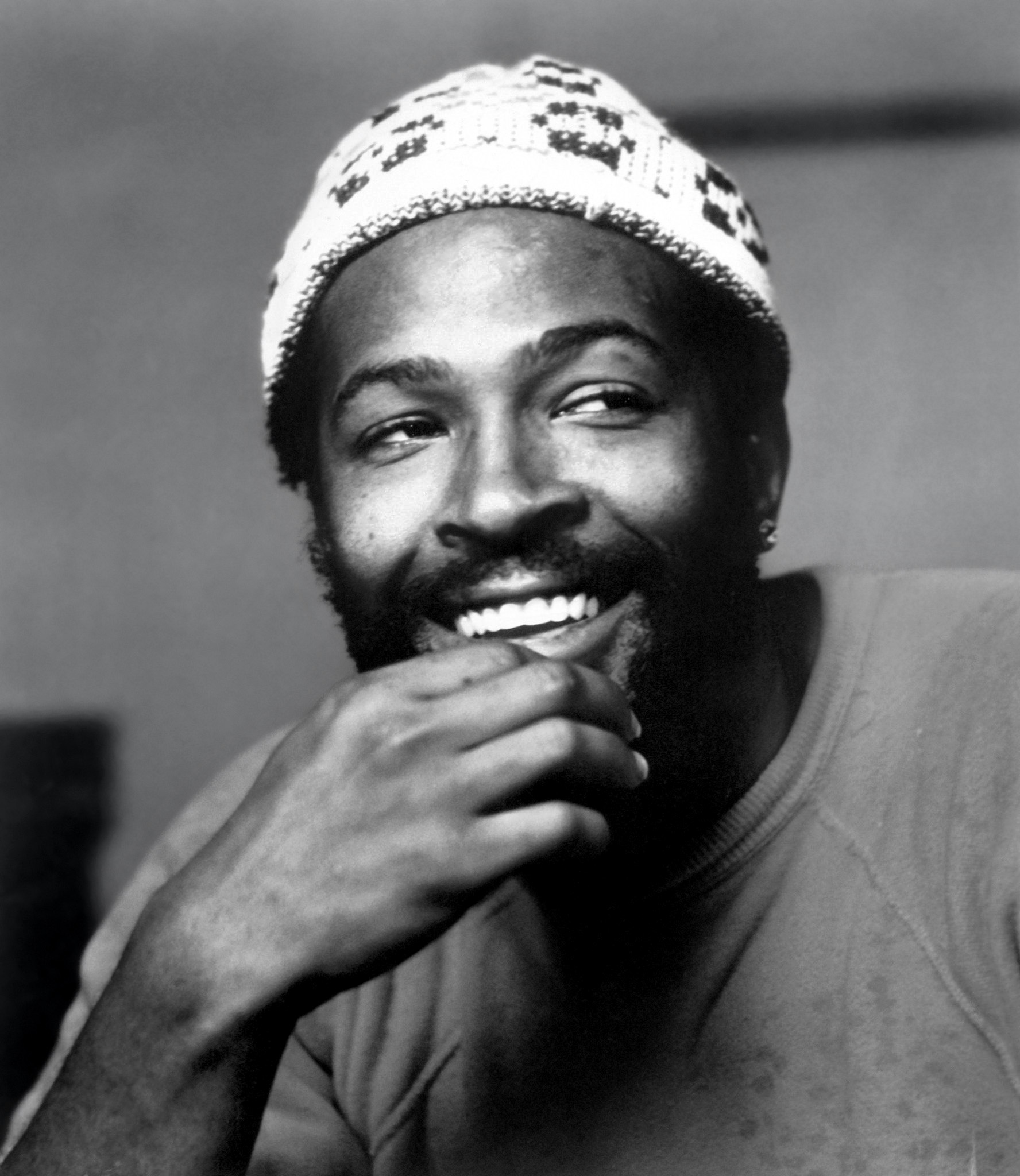
Marvin Gaye was shot and killed by his father during an argument in 1984.

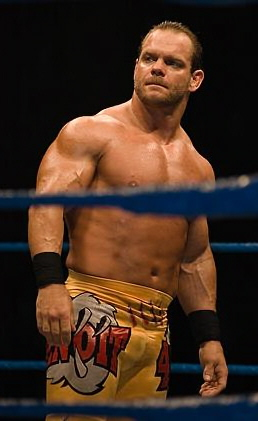
Chris Benoit, who murdered his wife and child before killing himself

== See also ==
- Foeticide, the killing of a fetus
- Neonaticide, the killing of a child during the first 24 hours of life
- Infanticide, the killing of an infant from birth to 12 months
- Pedocide, the murder of a child in general
- Filial cruelty, abuse toward one's own child
- Child abuse, abuse toward any child
- Avunculicide, the killing of one's uncle
- Fratricide, the killing of one's brother
- Mariticide, the killing of one's husband
- Matricide, the killing of one's mother
- Nepoticide, the killing of one's nephew
- Parricide, the killing of one's parents or another close relative
- Patricide, the killing of one's father
- Sororicide, the killing of one's sister
- Uxoricide, the killing of one's wife or girlfriend
- Nepiticide, the killing of one's niece
- Amiticide, the killing of one's aunt
- La Llorona
- Medea
- Honor killing, murder of a person for violating the strict reputation of the family.
