= Manal al-Sharif =

Saudi Arabian activist (born 1979)

- منال الشريف
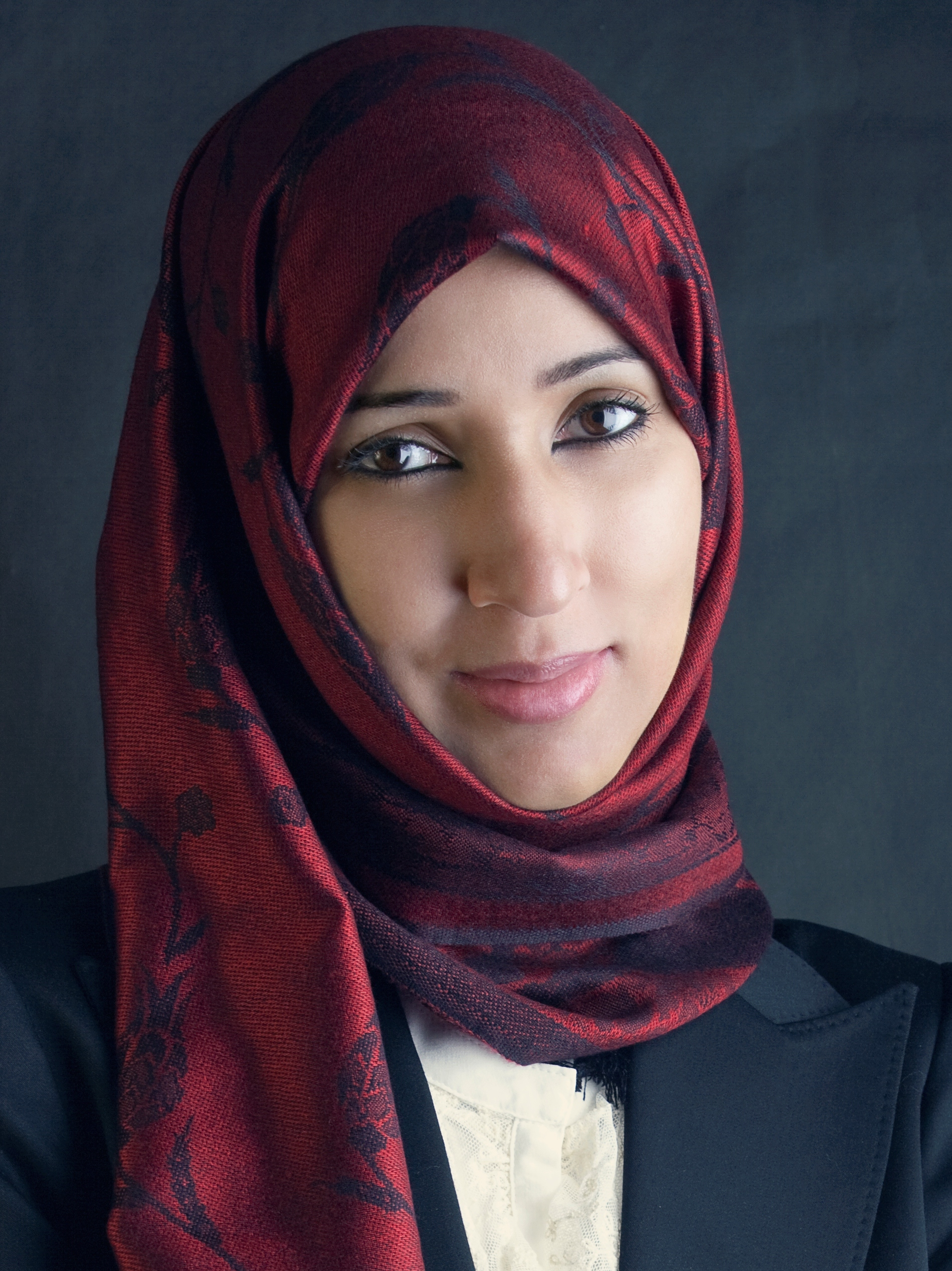
- Al-Sharif in 2011
- Born: 25 April 1979 (age 47); Mecca, Saudi Arabia
- Occupations: Computer Scientist, Saudi Aramco
- Known for: Defying female driving ban in Saudi Arabia
- Spouses: First husband (divorced) Rafael (m. 2012)
- Children: 2

Manal al-Sharif (Arabic: منال الشريف, romanized: Manāl Aš-Šarīf, pronounced [maˈnaːl aʃːaˈriːf]; born 25 April 1979) is a Saudi women's rights activist who helped start a right-to-drive campaign in 2011. Wajeha al-Huwaider filmed al-Sharif driving a car as part of the campaign. The video was posted on YouTube and Facebook. Al-Sharif was detained on 21 May 2011, released, and rearrested the following day. On 30 May, al-Sharif was released on bail, on the conditions of returning for questioning if required, not driving, and not talking to the media. The New York Times and Associated Press associated the women's driving campaign as part of the Arab Spring and the long duration of al-Sharif's detention due to Saudi authorities' fear of protests.

Following her driving campaign, al-Sharif remained an active critic of the Saudi government, tweeting on issues including imprisoned female foreign workers, the lack of elections for the Shura Council, and the murder of Lama al-Ghamdi. Her work has been recognized by Foreign Policy, Time, and the Oslo Freedom Forum.

== Background ==
Manal al-Sharif graduated from King Abdulaziz University with a Bachelor of Science in computing and a Cisco Career Certification. Until May 2012, she worked as an Information Security Consultant for Saudi Aramco, the Saudi national oil company. She also wrote for Alhayat, a Saudi daily. Al-Sharif's first book, Daring to Drive: a Saudi Woman's Awakening, was published in June 2017 by Simon & Schuster. It is also available in German, Arabic, Turkish and Danish.

== Women's rights campaigns ==
Al-Sharif has campaigned for women's rights in Saudi Arabia for many years. According to The New York Times, al-Sharif "has a reputation for drawing attention to the lack of rights for women". Regarding the 2011 women's driving campaign, Amnesty International stated that "Manal al-Sharif is following in a long tradition of women activists around the world who have put themselves on the line to expose and challenge discriminatory laws and policies".

=== Women's driving rights in Saudi Arabia ===
Women in Saudi Arabia had limited freedom of movement and in practice were not allowed to drive motor vehicles on public roads. In 1990, dozens of women in Riyadh drove their cars in protest, were imprisoned for one day, had their passports confiscated, and some of them lost their jobs. In September 2007, the Association for the Protection and Defense of Women's Rights in Saudi Arabia, co-founded by Wajeha al-Huwaider and Fawzia al-Uyyouni, gave a 1,100 signature petition to King Abdullah asking for women to be allowed to drive. On International Women's Day 2008, Huwaider filmed herself driving and received international media attention after the video was posted on YouTube. Inspired by the Arab Spring, a woman from Jeddah, Najla Hariri, started driving in the second week of May 2011, stating "Before in Saudi, you never heard about protests. [But] after what has happened in the Middle East, we started to accept a group of people going outside and saying what they want in a loud voice, and this has had an impact on me."

=== 2011 women driving campaign ===
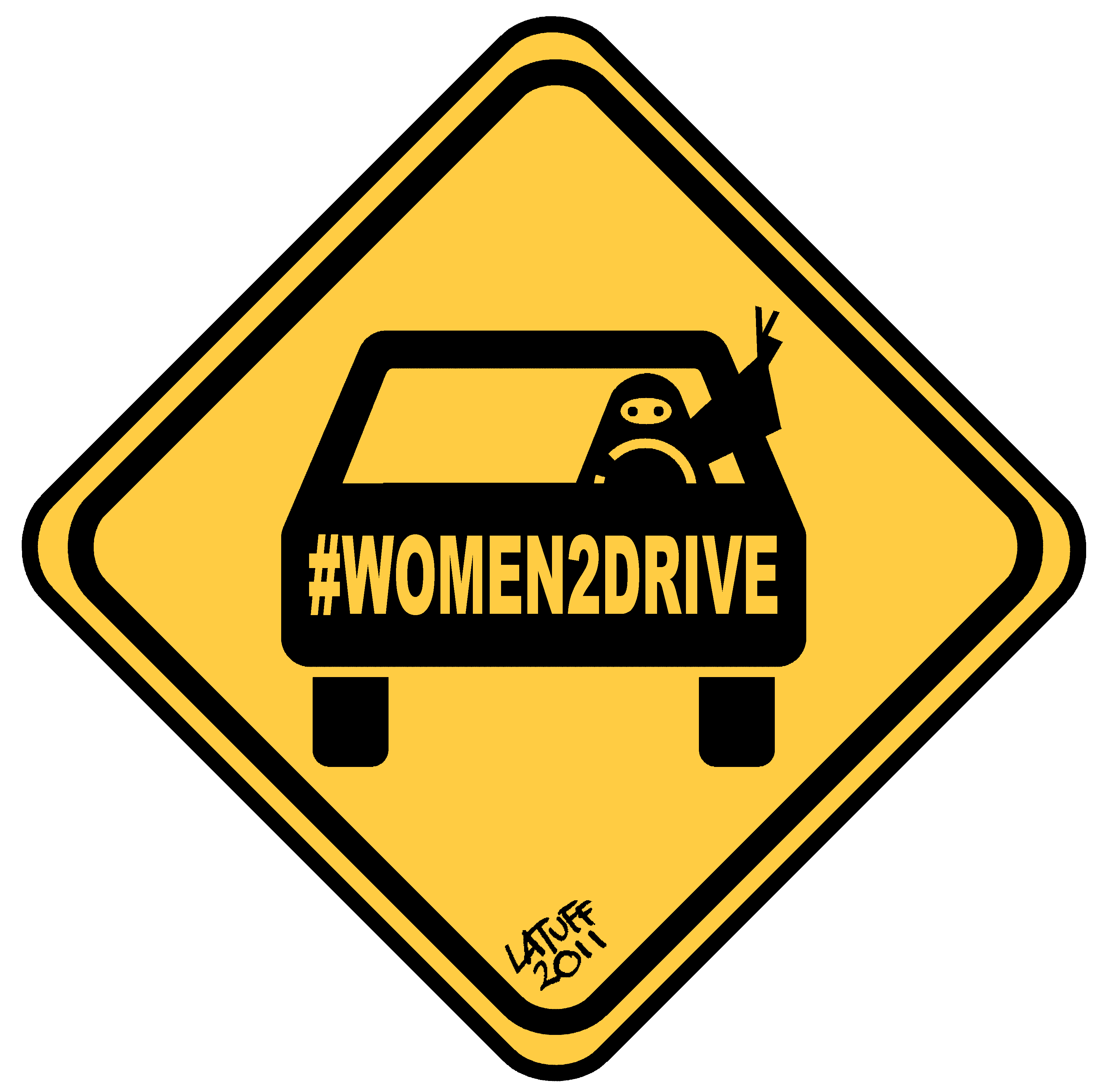
A political cartoon by Carlos Latuff about the Saudi women movement to lift the ban on their right to drive titled "New Saudi Arabia's traffic sign"

External videos
- Q&A interview with al-Sharif on her book Daring to Drive: A Saudi Woman's Awakening, July 16, 2017, C-SPAN

In 2011, a group of women including Manal al-Sharif started a Facebook campaign named "Teach me how to drive so I can protect myself" or "Women2Drive" that says that women should be allowed to drive. The campaign calls for women to start driving from 17 June 2011. By 21 May 2011, about 12,000 readers of the Facebook page had expressed their support. Al-Sharif describes the action as acting within women's rights, and "not protesting". Wajeha al-Huwaider was impressed by the campaign and decided to help.

In late May, al-Sharif drove her car in al-Akrabiyah, Khobar with al-Huwaider filming. The video was posted to YouTube and Facebook. In the video, al-Sharif stated, "This is a volunteer campaign to help the girls of this country [learn to drive]. At least for times of emergency, God forbid. What if whoever is driving them gets a heart attack?" She was detained by the religious police (CPVPV) on 21 May and released after six hours. By 23 May 2011, about 600,000 people had watched the video.

The YouTube video of al-Sharif's drive became inaccessible at its original location, the Facebook page for the campaign was deleted, and the Twitter account used by al-Sharif was "copied and altered". Supporters republished the original video and Facebook page and a summary of al-Sharif's five recommended rules for the 17 June campaign were published on a blog and by The New York Times.

On 22 May, al-Sharif was detained again and the Director General of Traffic Administration, Major-General Suleiman Al-Ajlan, was questioned by journalists regarding traffic regulations related to women driving. Al-Ajlan stated that the journalists should "put the question" to members of the Consultative Assembly of Saudi Arabia. RTBF suggested that al-Sharif had been sentenced to five days' imprisonment.

The New York Times described al-Sharif's campaign as a "budding protest movement" that the Saudi government tried to "swiftly extinguish". Associated Press said that Saudi authorities "cracked down harder than usual on al-Sharif, after seeing her case become a rallying call for youths anxious for change" in the context of the Arab Spring. Both news organisations attributed the long duration of al-Sharif's detention to Saudi authorities' fear of a wider protest movement in Saudi Arabia. Amnesty International declared Al-Sharif to be a prisoner of conscience and called for her immediate and unconditional release.

The day after al-Sharif's arrest, another woman was detained for driving a car. She drove with two women passengers in Ar Rass and was detained by traffic police in the presence of the CPVPV. She was released after signing a statement that she would not drive again. In reaction to al-Sharif's arrest, several more Saudi women published videos of themselves driving during the following days. On 26 May, authorities said that al-Sharif would remain in detention until 5 June 2011, according to Waleed Abu Al-Khair. Al-Sharif was conditionally freed on 30 May. Her lawyer Adnan al-Saleh said that she had been charged with "inciting women to drive" and "rallying public opinion". The conditions of Al-Sharif's release include bail, returning for questioning if requested, not driving and not talking to the media. As possible reasons for al-Sharif's early release, The National cited al-Sharif having written a letter to King Abdullah, 4,500 Saudis signing an online petition to the King, and "an outpouring of indignation and disbelief by both Saudis and critics abroad that Ms al-Sharif was jailed for something that is not a moral or criminal offence."

Al-Sharif filed an objection with the General Directorate of Traffic in Riyadh on 15 November 2011 because of officials rejecting her driver's licence application. Samar Badawi filed a similar lawsuit on 4 February 2012.

=== 2011 women prisoners campaign ===
Following her 30 May release from prison, al-Sharif started a Twitter campaign called "Faraj" to release Saudi, Filipino and Indonesian women prisoners in the Dammam women's prison who "are locked up just because they owe a small sum of money but cannot afford to pay the debt". Al-Sharif said that the women prisoners were mostly domestic workers who remained in prison after completing their prison terms, because they could not pay their debts and because their former Saudi employers did not help to release them or fund their flights to return to their countries of origin. She referred to 22 Indonesian women and named four women needing help and stated the amount of their debts. She called for donations to be made directly to the director of the Dammam women's prison in order to reimburse the women's debts and free them.

== Since 2012 ==
After being awarded the Václav Havel Prize for Creative Dissent in May 2012, al-Sharif's employer Aramco put pressure on her not to travel to formally receive the prize. Al-Sharif's boss threatened her with dismissal, stating, "If you are going to talk at another conference, you could lose your job. You are not allowed to go. We don't want our name to be associated with you." Al-Sharif travelled to receive her prize. She was dismissed from her job and had to leave the company-owned flat in which she had lived.

In December 2012, al-Sharif criticized an initiative by the Saudi government to inform husbands via SMS when their wives or dependents leave the country, in accordance with a law making men the legal guardians of their wives. "The small fact of the SMS story gives you the idea of the bigger problem with the whole guardianship system", she wrote on Twitter. When King Abdullah appointed women to the advisory Consultative Assembly of Saudi Arabia#Shura Council for the first time in January 2013, al-Sharif criticized the reform as too small, noting that the council was still not an elected body and could not pass legislation. In February, she worked to bring international attention to the case of five-year-old Lama al-Ghamdi, whose father Fayhan al-Ghamdi fatally raped, beat, and burned her; he served four months in jail and paid 1,000,000 riyals (roughly US$267,000) in blood money. On 7 October 2013, it was announced that al-Ghamdi had been sentenced to 8 years in prison, plus 800 lashes.

In January 2019, al-Sharif closed her Twitter account. She stated that while Twitter had "once saved [her] life" and that online social network services had enabled Saudis to carry out uncensored discussion and communication for several years, especially around 2011, Saudi authorities found ways to use Twitter that she considered too authoritarian for her to continue using it. Al-Sharif argued that the Saudi authorities "effectively shaped and molded the Twitter discourse by buying trolls and bots, while directly or indirectly threatening, harassing or arresting and jailing those who were influencers and didn't speak favorably of the government policies." Al-Sharif quoted a New York Times report of a Saudi intelligences services infiltrator in Twitter who enabled the authorities to identify and arrest well-known Saudi Twitter users who had until then been protected by their anonymity. Al-Sharif called for software developers to develop and improve decentralised social media platforms, such as the Fediverse, with mechanisms to "reward authentic and organic content, instead of rewarding bots and fake accounts" and to "not allow the powerful and wealthy to manipulate and dominate the conversation".

In April 2019, the Saudi embassy in Washington invited Manal al-Sharif via Twitter to meet the new ambassador, Reema bint Bandar.

== Personal life ==
Al-Sharif has two sons. Her first son lives in Saudi Arabia with his grandmother, and her second son is in Australia with al-Sharif. As of June 2017, the two sons had never met in person, having only met on video calls.

She first married in Saudi Arabia and had a son in 2005. The marriage ended in a divorce and based on Saudi divorce rules, her ex-husband retained full legal custody of the child. Al-Sharif moved to Dubai after the separation and was forced to travel back to Saudi Arabia when she wanted to see her son because her ex-husband refused to let him travel. Al-Sharif went to court to contest the travel restriction but the court refused and cited a 10th-century Islamic text about the "risk of the child dying en route on such a dangerous distance."

On 23 January 2012, al-Sharif was mistakenly reported dead in a car crash in Jeddah. On 25 January, The Guardian confirmed that she was alive, and that the crash victim was an "unnamed member of a desert community" who was not involved in the female driving campaign.

Al-Sharif had another son in 2014 from her second marriage.

Al-Sharif is fluent in English as she has lived in both New Hampshire, USA, and Australia. She considers herself a liberal Muslim. She is observant in most Islamic practices, including Halal, praying five to six times a day, etc. When marrying her Brazilian husband, she required him to convert to Islam in accordance with Islamic law in order to marry her, and he recited the Shahada at a mosque in Brazil to formally convert to Islam, and he took a Muslim name.

== Recognition ==
Foreign Policy magazine named al-Sharif one of the Top 100 Global Thinkers of 2011, and she was listed in Forbes list of Women Who (Briefly) Rocked in the same year. In 2012, al-Sharif was named one of the Fearless Women of the year by The Daily Beast, and Time magazine named her one of the 100 Most Influential People of 2012. She was also one of three people awarded the first annual Václav Havel Prize for Creative Dissent at the Oslo Freedom Forum.

== See also ==
- 2011 Saudi Arabian protests
- Dina Ali
- Islamic feminism
- Sara bint Talal bin Abdulaziz Al Saud
- Samar Badawi
- Hamza Kashgari
- Mishaal bint Fahd bin Mohammed Al Saud
