= Romana Zienertová =

Czech mass murderer

- Born: C. 1975
- Children: 4
- Status: Imprisoned
- Motive: Financial distress
- Penalty: Life imprisonment

Details
- Victims: 4
- Country: Czech Republic
- Location: Široký Důl
- Weapons: Knife and Pillow

Romana Zienertová (born 1975) is a Czech mass murderer who killed her four children. The murders of her children are considered one of the worst mass murders in modern Czech history.

== The murders ==
On September 2, 2011, at her home in Široký Důl (Svitavy District)—where she had moved just days before committing the act—she attempted a so-called extended suicide. She had a daughter, Romana (aged 2 months), with her partner Jaroslav, and children from previous relationships: Lukáš (aged 2), Eliška (aged 4), and David (aged 8). Before the murders, she sent her oldest son out to buy groceries. Romana then grabbed a kitchen knife and slit the throats of her three youngest children. She then cut their and wrists to make sure they were dead. When her son came back, she chased him up to the attic, and suffocated David, with a pillow. After the act, she then tried to commit suicide by hanging herself and slitting her wrists from a rafter beam. Her attempt failed after her partner arrived and called by the rapid arrival of the police patrol. According to witnesses, she had been described as great caregiver to the children.

== Legal Proceedings ==
In court, she claimed to remember nothing of the murder or the events leading up to it. She also displayed no emotion or remorse during the proceedings, even when video footage from the crime scene was played. According to psychiatric and psychological expert evaluations, she did not suffer from a mental disorder and was feigning memory loss.

On May 11, 2012, the Regional Court in Hradec Králové found her guilty and sentenced her to life imprisonment. The woman collapsed after the verdict was announced; as this situation might have prevented her from lodging an appeal, the proceedings were rescheduled for May 30 of that same year. Following the sentencing and consultation with her lawyer, she appealed to the High Court in Prague. On September 19, 2012, the High Court upheld the life sentence. She began serving her sentence at the prison in Opava.

== Aftermath ==
The house where the murders occurred was later sold.
