= Murders of the Dickason children =

2021 murder of three children in New Zealand

- Dickason children in 2021
- Location: Timaru, New Zealand
- Date: 16 September 2021; 5 years ago
- Attack type: Murder by suffocation
- Deaths: 3
- Perpetrator: Lauren Anne Dickason
- Charges: Murder (3 counts)
- Verdict: Guilty

On 16 September 2021, Lauren Anne Dickason, a 40-year-old South African-born doctor who had emigrated to New Zealand five days earlier, murdered her three daughters—six-year-old Liané and two-year-old twins Maya and Karla—at their home in Timaru. While her husband was out at a work dinner, Dickason gathered the girls in a bedroom, initially trying to asphyxiate them with linked cable ties before smothering them with towels and blankets until they died. She then attempted suicide by swallowing prescription pills and cutting herself with a knife.

The murders occurred following years of severe mental illness, fertility struggles, and a turbulent migration process. Dickason had suffered from major depressive disorder, anxiety, and postpartum depression dating back to 2015, following 17 rounds of IVF and a late-term miscarriage in 2013. Her mental health deteriorated significantly during the COVID-19 pandemic, local political violence in South Africa, and the family's move to New Zealand. In the months prior to the murders, Dickason experienced recurrent homicidal thoughts about her children, conducted online searches regarding lethal drug dosages for children, and was under acute stress over pending Immigration New Zealand requests for health clearances regarding Karla's cleft palate and her own psychiatric history.

At her trial in the Christchurch High Court during July and August 2023, Dickason admitted to causing the deaths but entered pleas of insanity and infanticide, the latter carrying a lesser penalty under New Zealand law. The trial centered on conflicting expert psychiatric testimony: three defence experts testified that severe clinical depression and delusions rendered her unable to understand the moral wrongfulness of her actions, while two Crown experts argued that she acted out of anger, resentment, and a desire for control. Following 15 hours of deliberation, the jury returned an 11 to 1 majority verdict on 16 August 2023 convicting Dickason of three counts of murder, rejecting both special defences.

On 26 June 2024, Dickason was sentenced to 18 years' imprisonment with no minimum non-parole period. She was remanded to Hillmorton Hospital until deemed mentally fit for prison, and has been served with a deportation order to take effect upon her release. In July 2024, Dickason's legal team lodged an appeal against her convictions in the Court of Appeal of New Zealand, which is scheduled to begin on 9 February 2027.

== Lauren Dickason ==
=== Early life and career ===
Lauren Dickason is the daughter of Malcolm and Wendy Fawkes. Dickason attended a boarding school in Pretoria, South Africa. From the age of 15, Dickason experienced depression and anxiety. She also had post-natal depression. She later studied medicine at the University of Cape Town, completing her degree in 2004 and becoming a doctor. Dickason subsequently completed her rural health practice in Pretoria, where she met her husband Graham Dickason, an orthopaedic surgeon, in 2005. The couple married in 2006.

=== Children and mental health issues ===
Lauren Dickason experienced multiple fertility struggles. To have children, she had 17 rounds of IVF, and needed donor eggs. In 2013, she suffered a miscarriage after 18 weeks of pregnancy. After her pregnancy loss, Dickason did not return to work and became a part-time surgeon assistant to Graham.

Dickason went on to have three children: Liané (who was six years old at the time of her death) and twins Maya and Karla (who were two years old at the time of their deaths). Liané was born in September 2014 while Karla and Maya were born in November 2018. Following the birth of the twins, the Dickasons enlisted the services of a nanny named Maria Mendy Sibanyoni, who worked for the family between November 2018 and May 2020.

Dickason was diagnosed with a "major depression disorder with underlying anxiety" in 2015, that was linked to postpartum depression caused by her 2013 miscarriage. Dickason reportedly experienced flashbacks of the loss of her child, sleep difficulties, crying, suicidal thoughts, panic attacks, restlessness, detached feelings, and intrusive thoughts. Dickason experienced anxiety and depression leading up to and following the birth of her twin daughters, which was caused by Karla's cleft palate.

In May 2019, Dickason saw a psychiatrist after experiencing homicidal thoughts towards her children. This episode had been triggered after she and her nanny struggled with putting her twins to bed. Dickason has spoken about Karla being a difficult child, saying that Karla lashed out often, slapped and bit her. Dickason said that her children were "never enough".

=== Emigration to New Zealand ===
In 2019 the Dickason family decided to emigrate to New Zealand. They had planned to move in August 2020, but their migration plans were delayed by the global COVID-19 pandemic and immigration issues. Though Dickason experienced episodes of depression and suicidal thoughts during the pandemic, her mood improved between late 2020 and June 2021. The Crown claimed she experienced a remission for at least two months. Dickason also participated in a wellness programme.

Without consulting her doctor, Dickason had stopped taking her antidepressant medication in March 2021 but subsequently resumed her medication regime in August 2021. In July 2021, Dickason's mental health deteriorated during the 2021 South African unrest triggered by the imprisonment of former President Jacob Zuma. Dickason feared for the safety of her children and kept them at home. During that period, Dickason experienced thoughts about harming and killing her children. Dickason confided in her husband Graham, who reacted with anger and convinced her to resume her antidepressant medication. Dickason continued to experience homicidal thoughts following a foot surgery but did not disclose them since she feared it would affect their immigration plans. That same month, Graham's essential skills work visa was approved by Immigration New Zealand.

In July 2021, one of Dickason's friends also sent her a TikTok video where a mother recites a poem named "Mom needs a minute", about the struggles of raising her children and the "chaos inside of her brain". Dickason responded by saying "Awesome xxx, that's exactly how I feel". Over the following months, Dickason searched the Internet for different methods on how to overdose her children. In August 2021, Dickason experienced thoughts about using cable ties to asphyxiate her children after witnessing her husband and the girls playing with cable ties in the family garage. The incident occurred two weeks before the family emigrated to New Zealand. Dickason became withdrawn and communicated less, and cried frequently. During testimony, her mother Wendy recalled that Dickason's mental health had deteriorated during that period and she had experienced significant weight loss.

Following two weeks in managed isolation, the Dickason family arrived in Timaru on 11 September 2021. Dickason was unhappy during her time in Timaru, taking issue with the appearance of the town's residents and describing local rental accommodation as "small, disgusting and creepy." She feared that her children would be the target of cyberbullying when they became older and likened the treatment of indigenous Māori people to Apartheid in South Africa. These issues led her to regret emigrating to New Zealand. According to defence experts, Dickason became fixated on these issues to the point that they became delusions reinforced by her depression.

The children were murdered on the night of 16 September 2021. On the day of the killings, Karla and Maya had attended their first day at preschool while Liané had attended her second day at Timaru Christian School. After being picked up, Karla threw a tantrum in the car. Later, the family visited the local botanical gardens. During that trip, Dickason alleged that a group of girls had warned her that a boy in the park was photographing her children, which led her to believe that New Zealand was as dangerous as South Africa. That same day, Dickason had thoughts of "brutally killing" the children by means of sedating them and cutting their femoral arteries.

That night, Graham Dickason went out with colleagues, leaving Lauren alone with her children. During a subsequent police interview, Lauren Dickason told detectives that the children "were being wild again, jumping on the couches, not listening to what I'm trying to tell them..." She also told police that "something just triggered me". According to Newshub, Dickason had told investigators that she had been triggered by an Immigration NZ request for more medical information about Kayla's cleft palate and her own mental health, as well as her feeling that she did not have the strength to make the children's school lunches.

After gathering the children in a bedroom, she told them they were going to make necklaces with cable ties and tricked them into wearing the ties around their necks. Dickason said she told her children "Mummy's very sick and is going to die. I can't leave you behind because I don't know who’s going to look after you." Dickason then asphyxiated the children, starting with Karla and then Liané and Maya. Dickason told police officers that Karla had been "really horrible" to her recently and that Liané had fought back. She recalled that "the oldest one was very angry and she wants to know why I'm doing this to them because I'm the best mum and she loves me."

Since the children were still breathing, Dickason then smothered them with a towel and their blankets. Afterwards, she tried to commit suicide with a knife and by pills. The bodies were discovered in their beds by Graham after he returned home from the work event. Graham confronted a distraught Dickason, who told him it was "too late" before falling into a catatonic state.

== Police investigation and legal proceedings ==
At 10 pm on 16 September 2021, Police in Timaru responded to a call by neighbours Karen and Brad Cowper, who responded to a distraught Graham. At the house, Police found the three dead children and Lauren Dickason, who was hospitalised in stable condition. Police were also joined by Graham's work colleague Mark Cvitanich and his wife Cathy, who had responded to Graham's phone call. Cvitanich had also called the Police and emergency services. Dickason was taken to Timaru Hospital.

On 17 September, Police interviewed Dickason, who admitted to killing her three children. Later that day, Detective Inspector Scott Anderson confirmed that Police had arrested a 40-year-old woman about the deaths of the three dead children. Anderson said the children's deaths were an isolated incident and that Police were not seeking anyone else.

On 18 September, Dickason appeared in the Timaru District Court and was later remanded to a forensic psychiatric ward at Christchurch's Hillmorton Hospital. She was later placed in a hospital psychiatric unit. At Hillmorton Hospital, she was interviewed by five forensic psychiatrists and psychologists for 53 hours. Three of them, Susan Hatters-Friedman, Justin Barry-Walsh and Ghazi Metoui, believed she was severely mentally unwell and could claim a defence based on insanity or infanticide. The two others, Erik Monasterio and Simone McLeavey believed that Dickason killed her children out of anger and control, including not wanting to let another woman parent her children if she died and Graham remarried.

On 5 October 2021, Dickason's lawyer Kerryn Beaton QC sought an extended remand for her client at Hillmorton hospital. Dickason had been scheduled to appear at the Timaru High Court that day but her appearance had been delayed due to an impending mental health assessment. On 15 October, Beaton told a court hearing in Christchurch that Dickason would plead not guilty to three charges of murder. Dickason was unable to attend the court hearing since she was ill. Beaton sought further remand for Dickason to Hillmorton hospital until her next appearance, which was not opposed by Crown prosecutor Andrew McRae. A trial date for March 2023 was set in Timaru.

== Trial ==
=== Opening arguments ===
The trial of Lauren Dickason commenced on 17 July 2023 at the Christchurch High Court. Judge Cameron Mander presided over the trial while Andrew McRae served as Crown prosecutor. McRae delivered his opening address and detailed the circumstances of the children's deaths and Dickason's attempted suicide. Defence lawyer Anne Toohey also outlined the defence's opening arguments. While the Crown has argued that Dickason murdered her children because she resented the impact they had on her marriage, Dickason has not pleaded guilty to murder due to insanity or infanticide.

=== Trial evidence ===
In addition to testimony from Graham Dickason, emergency responders, and the children's teachers, the Crown also utilised digital forensic evidence and Dickason's police interview following the children's deaths.

On 26 July, the Crown rested its case. Defence counsel Toohey delivered her opening address to the jury, arguing that the defendant's decision to kill her children was "spontaneous" because Dickason believed that her and the children's lives were not worth living and "that they were all better off dead." In addition to the defendant's mother Wendy Fawkes, the defence also relied on three expert witnesses: the forensic and reproductive psychiatrist Dr Susan Hatters-Friedman, forensic psychiatrist Dr Justin Barry-Walsh and forensic psychologist Ghazi Metoui. The prosecution also called upon two expert witnesses: Canterbury District Health Board clinical director and psychiatrist Dr Erik Monasterio and Hillmorton Hospital consultant psychiatrist Dr Simone McLeavey.

=== Closing arguments ===
On 11 August, McRae gave the closing address for the trial. The Crown said that Dickason knew that what she was doing was morally wrong (there was no altruistic motive), and that the key drivers of the killing was "anger and control". McRae said that "this is a trial by jury, not a trial by experts", stating that the defence experts who assessed Dickason did not do it during the time of the killing, whereas the Crown did. The Crown also said that defence experts ignored "crucial information".

Dickason provided inconsistent accounts of what happened for explanations months apart. The Crown said that the post partum depression had remitted, and that it was at best a minimal contributor. The Crown said that the evidence provided by the defence experts should be treated with "great caution" as Dickason reported killing Karla first on multiple occasions because she had been misbehaving, such as biting and scratching her. The defence, however, said that Karla was killed first because she was the closest to Dickason. When asked whether she thinks the killings were a result of her postpartum depression, she answered "no", and that the idea for killing "just popped up", although the Crown later said "We knew the thoughts didn’t just pop into her head".

The closing address of the defence started at around 2:30 pm. The address mentioned Dickason's 16 rounds of IVF, that the family moved to New Zealand in order to provide a better life for the children and that the world was dangerous for her children, that Dickason had postpartum depression after the births of her twins, that her mental health made her very unwell, and that Dickason's husband did not understand her illness, that Dickason was "reliable and consistent" when talking to experts. They said that she was not asked by police why she killed her children, and that Dickason "didn't tell anyone that she killed them out of anger". The defence also said that Dickason's brother, sister or close family members could have given context about her life.

=== Deliberations and verdict ===
On the fifth week, Justice Mander summed up the case. He talked about the Police interview on the day after the deaths of the children, and then told the jury to not let emotion change their ideas, in particular sympathy, prejudice, and others caused by media attention. He mentioned that there were no disputes about Dickason causing the deaths of the children, and that the question is whether it was murder, infanticide or insanity due to the undisputed unbalance of Dickason's mind at the time. He also summarised the evidence given by the experts assessing Dickason's health.

On 16 August 2023, Dickason was found guilty of murdering her children in the Christchurch High Court. Following 15 hours of deliberation, the jury reached a majority verdict (11-1) to convict Dickason of three counts of murder. The majority of jurors rejected her partial defence of infanticide and defence of insanity, and accepted the Crown's argument that Dickason "acted methodically, purposefully and even clinically out of anger and control" when she killed her three children. Dickason stood motionless in the dock as the verdict was delivered. She wept as she was led out of court. Both of Dickason's lawyers and several members of the jury wept following the verdict. Justice Mander remanded her to Hillmorton Hospital until her sentencing date, stating that she was under a compulsory treatment order that made prison inappropriate. Mander has also sought expert reports on Dickason's mental state and an appropriate sentence.

Following the verdict, Dickason's parents Malcolm and Wendy Fawkes issued a statement blaming postpartum depression for taking the lives of their grandchildren Lianè, Karla and Maya. They also stated there were "no winners in this tragedy" and urged greater awareness of the effects of postpartum depression.

=== Sentencing ===
The judge asked to determine the length and type of sentence following a mental health assessment of Dickason. The Sentencing Act presumes that murder would result in life imprisonment unless it would be "manifestly unjust to do so". The decision on whether Dickason will go to jail or the psychiatric unit of Hillmorton Hospital has not yet been decided. Dickason will not be extradited to her home country of South Africa.

In early September 2023, Dickason's sentencing date was set for 19 December 2023. It was later postponed to 2024 as this date became vacated. On 14 February the date was set to 20 March. It was later rescheduled to 26 June due to delays caused by determining whether she should serve her sentence in prison or be detained as a special patient under the Mental Health (Compulsory Assessment and Treatment) Act 1992. Until 26 June, she will be staying in Hillmorton Hospital.

She was sentenced on 26 June 2024 to 18 years in prison, as three concurrent determinate sentences of 18 years. She was not given a minimum term of imprisonment, and will be kept in a mental health hospital until she is deemed mentally fit for prison. When the sentence was delivered, Dickason was silent and had no reaction. During the sentencing, victim impact statements from Dickason's family members including Graham and both paternal and maternal relatives were read.

Dickason has been served with a deportation order that will take effect upon her release from prison.

=== Appeal ===
In early August 2024, it was reported that Dickason's legal team had lodged an appeal against her conviction in the New Zealand Court of Appeal on 23 July. The grounds for the appeal have not yet been disclosed. If successful, a second trial could be held.

=== Cost ===
The New Zealand government granted $709,000 for Dickason's defence in the trial. This included $153,970 for three psychiatric or psychological reports, $71,062.50 on a forensic psychologist, $58,700.81 for expert witnesses, $39,945.78 for "other payments" or disbursements for the witnesses, $6,367.50 on a private investigator, $9,480 on computer forensics, and $3,000 on "expert legal opinion".

Dickason's legal team spent 1714.25 hours working on her defence. Crown Solicitor Andrew McRae spent 732.5 hours.

== Responses ==
=== Memorials ===
On 18 September 2021, the Ministry of Business, Innovation and Employment (MBIE) announced that it would help the Dickason family's relatives travel to New Zealand and secure a place in managed isolation per the country's COVID-19 quarantine requirements at the time. The Dickasons' former nanny Mari Sibanyoni also expressed shock and grief after learning of the children's deaths.

On 23 September 2021, a candelight vigil was held in Timaru's Queen Street in honour of the victims Lianne, Maya, and Karla Dickason. Graham also read a letter expressing forgiveness for his wife, honouring the memory of his late children, and thanking friends and family in New Zealand, South Africa, and elsewhere. A similar service was held in Pretoria in honour of the children. Graham subsequently returned to South Africa in December 2021.

The Dickasons' former Timaru neighbours Rob and Jade Whaley also built a memorial garden in honour of the Dickason children, with a tree called the Angel Dickason tree. Three white stones were also placed at the base of the tree in memory of the girls.

=== Responses to trial and verdict ===
The Independent Online's Jehran Naidoo compared Dickason to the American mother Andrea Yates, who was acquitted of murdering her five children by reason of insanity following a lengthy legal battle. Naidoo noted that both women suffered from mental illness and post-partum depression, had experienced previous miscarriages, had professionally-accomplished husbands, and killed their children while their husbands were away from home.

In mid August 2023, the jury's verdict was welcomed by Mayor of Timaru Nigel Bowen, who said "the guilty verdicts put the full stop in the story of a very dark time for the town." Bowen encouraged people to check on others in the community, stating "that mental health was something still kept in the shadows." Judge Mander also thanked the jury for their services. Lead investigator Detective Inspector Scott Anderson, local chaplan Alan Cummings, and South Canterbury Chief Medical Officer Dr Ben Pearson also extended sympathies to the victims' families and welcomed the trial verdict as a form of closure.

New Zealand current affairs bloggers David Farrar and Martyn Bradbury labelled the guilty verdict as justice for Dickason's deceased children.

=== Support for Lauren Dickason ===
Following her conviction, supporters of Dickason established a Facebook support group called "Support for Lauren Dickason," which attracted a thousand members including her father Malcolm Fawkes. The group was started in July 2022, has over 1,900 members from multiple countries, and is composed mostly of women, with its spokesperson saying that the verdict has caused "Women's voices [to be] silenced." These supporters have announced plans to organise a march and picnic in Christchurch in November 2023. They intend to walk from the justice precinct to the Christchurch's Botanic Gardens with T-shirts with printings reading "support not silence" and holding sunflowers, the symbol of the support group. A picnic in support of Maternal Mental Health will be held in the Christchurch Botanic Gardens following the walk. In addition, another supporter named Tanya Parker organised a petition urging Judge Mander to consider postpartum depression as a factor in sentencing Dickason, and for the legal profession to recognise postpartum depression as a public health crisis. The group also created a 370–page book of supportive letters titled 'Lauren: Our love and support'. It was sent to Lauren on the day of the second year anniversary of the children's deaths.

In early October, The Press reported that Dickason penned a letter to her supporters thanking them for "your love" during a "difficult time." The letter revealed that she had also made three teddy bears from her late daughters' clothing. In that letter, Dickason also stated that she could never forgive herself for "what happened." In response to media publicity, Hillmorton Hospital authorities restricted Dickason's communications, banning her from sending or receiving letters while awaiting sentencing for her murder convictions. They were later lifted, allowing Lauren to receive letters from her supporters again.
