= New Zealand–South Africa relations =

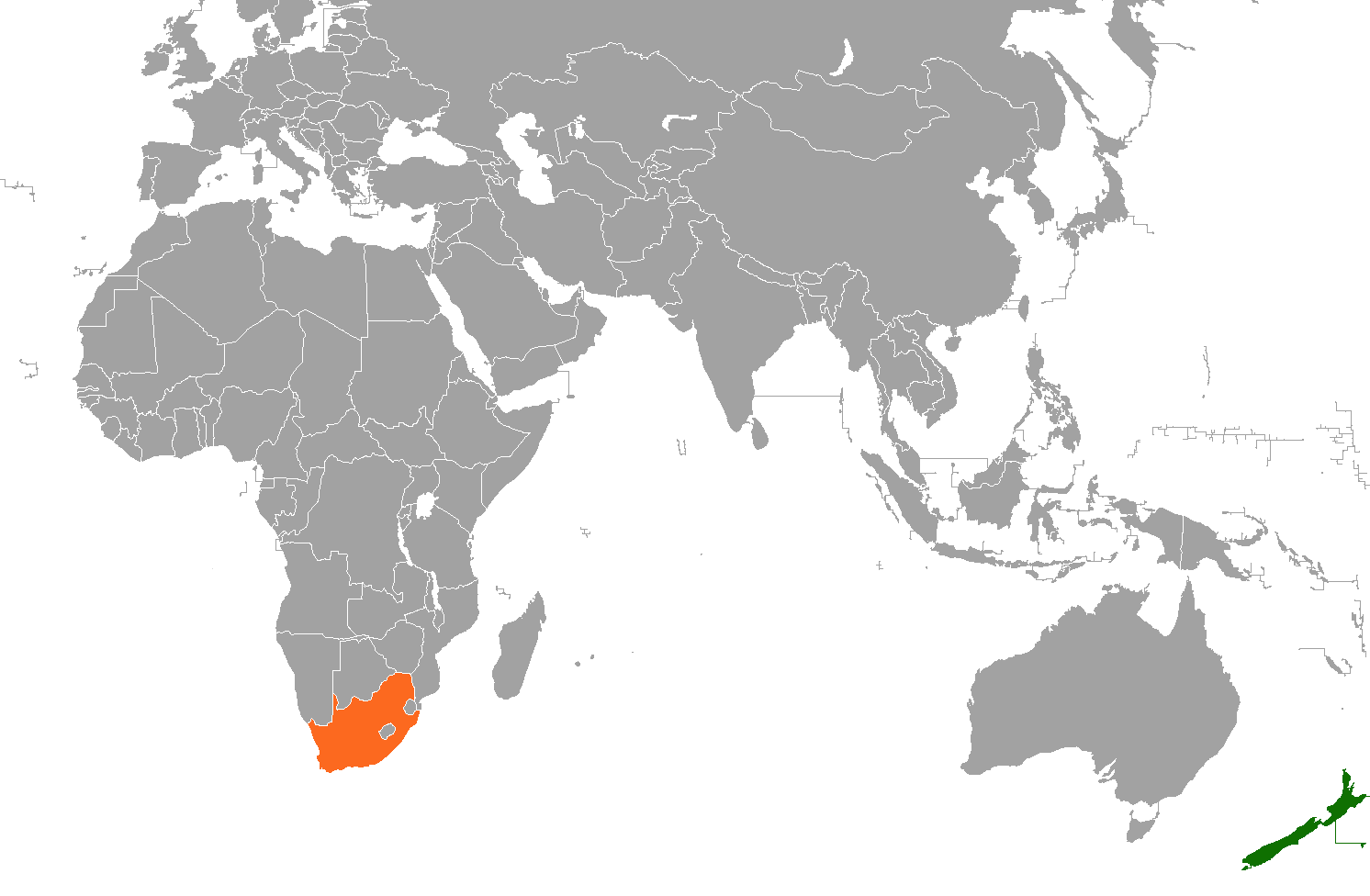

- New Zealand: South Africa

New Zealand–South Africa relations refers to the diplomatic relations between New Zealand and South Africa. Both countries are members of the Cairns Group, Commonwealth of Nations and the United Nations.

== History ==
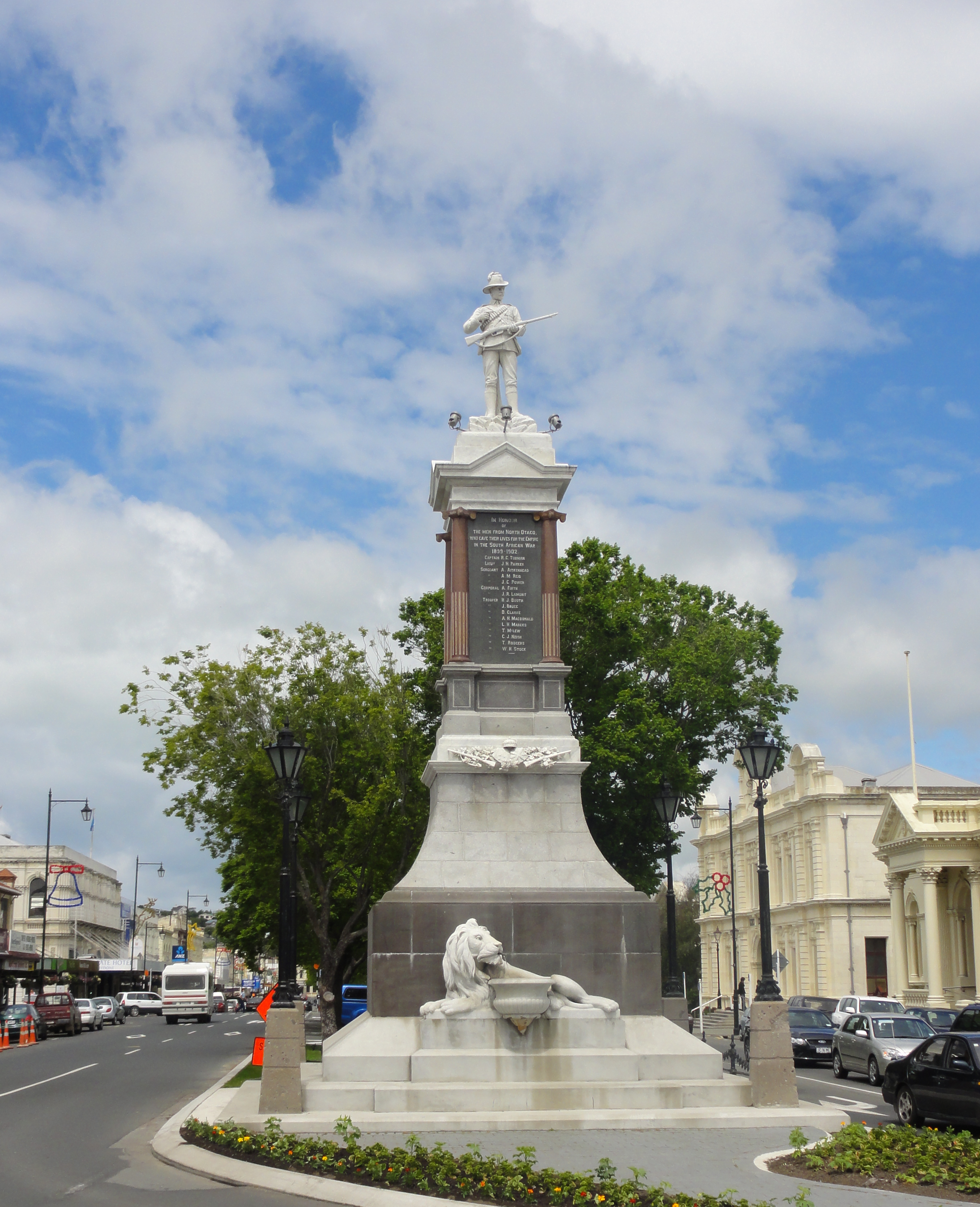
Memorial to the Second Boer War in Oamaru, New Zealand

Both nations are historically linked through the British Empire. Although there was very little contact between both territories at the time; between 1899 and 1902, New Zealand contributed over 6,000 soldiers to fight alongside the British during the Second Boer War to fight against primarily Afrikaans-speaking settlers of the Transvaal Republic and Orange Free State. Approximately 230 New Zealanders lost their lives in the war which resulted in a British win over the whole of South Africa.

During World War I and World War II; soldiers from both New Zealand and South Africa fought alongside each other in Europe and North Africa. South Africa obtained its independence from Great Britain in 1934 while New Zealand obtained its independence in 1947.

After World War II, South Africa adopted the policy of apartheid against the majority black South African population. New Zealand maintained diplomatic relations with the country until controversy erupted during the 1981 South Africa rugby union tour of New Zealand which led to mass protest against the South African government's policy on apartheid. In 1984, New Zealand severed diplomatic relations with South Africa. This followed the election of the Labour government of David Lange, which pledged to close the South African consulate in Wellington.

After the release of Nelson Mandela from prison and progress on the negotiations to end apartheid in South Africa came to fruition; New Zealand re-established diplomatic relations with South Africa on 19 January 1994. In May 1994, New Zealand Prime Minister Jim Bolger attended the inauguration of Nelson Mandela. In 1995, South Africa hosted the Rugby World Cup and the last game was between New Zealand and South Africa; which deepened the relationship between both fans and politicians of both nations. In November that same year, President Nelson Mandela paid an official visit to New Zealand. In 1996 New Zealand opened a High Commission in Pretoria and South Africa followed suit by opening a High Commission in Wellington in 2009.

== Migration ==
In 2013, there was an estimated community of 54,200 South Africans residing in New Zealand. Most of the community arrived to New Zealand after the end of apartheid in South Africa and most came for economic, safety and lifestyle reasons.

== Trade ==
In 2024, two-way trade between both nations amounted US$242 million. New Zealand's main export products to South Africa include: dairy products, electronics, machinery and pharmaceuticals. South Africa's main export products to New Zealand include: vehicles, fishing ships, fruits, minerals and machinery.

== Resident diplomatic missions ==
of New Zealand in South Africa

- Pretoria (High Commission)

of South Africa in New Zealand

- Wellington (High Commission)

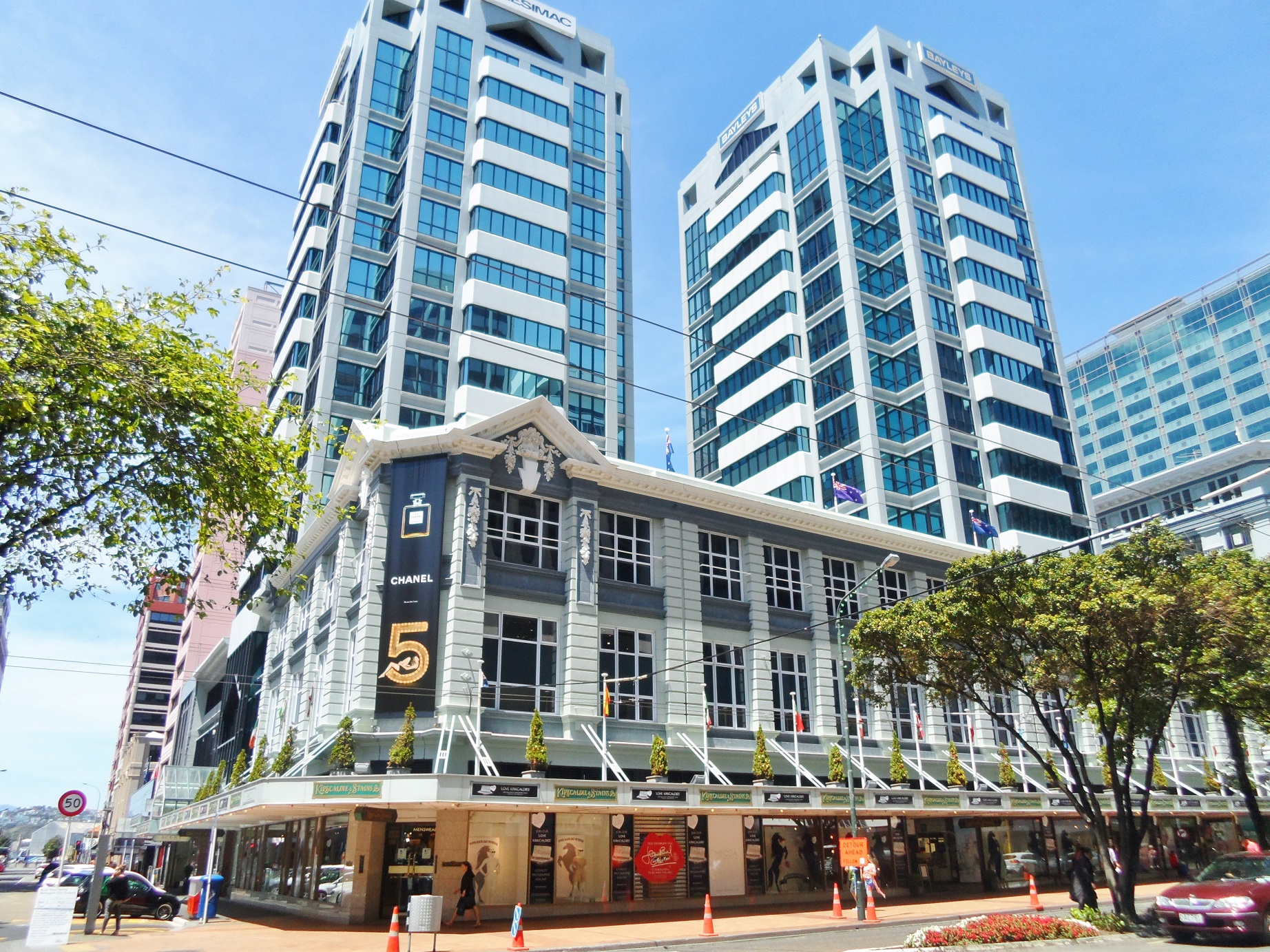
Midland Chambers Building hosting the South African High Commission in Wellington

== See also ==
- South African New Zealanders
