= South African New Zealanders =

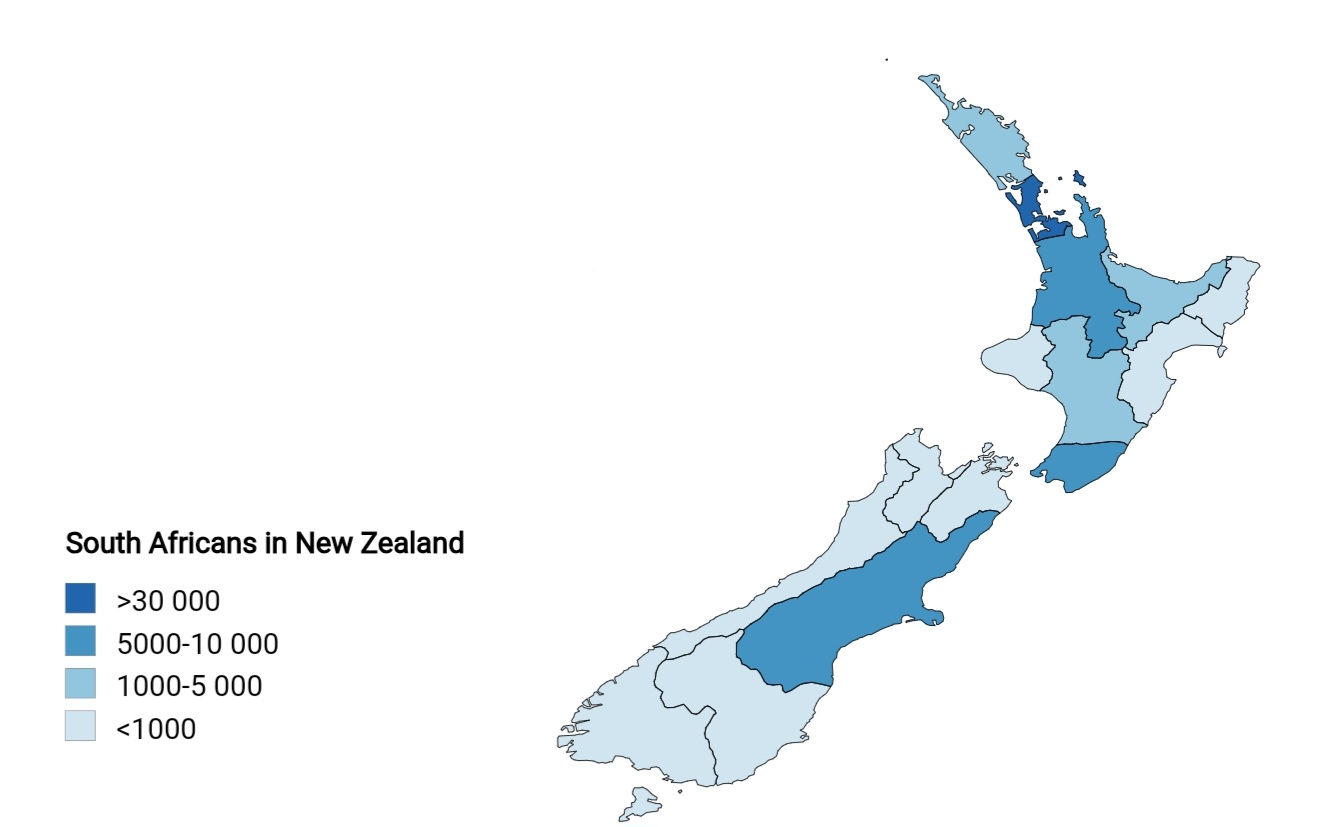

Total population
- 2023 Census: 95,577 (1.5% of New Zealand's total population)

Regions with significant populations
- South African-born people by region (2018)
- Auckland: 36,759
- Waikato: 6,936
- Wellington: 6,435
- Canterbury: 6,195
- Bay of Plenty: 4,299
- Northland: 1,923
- Manawatū-Whanganui: 1,830

Languages
- English (New Zealand, South African), Afrikaans

Related ethnic groups
- South African diaspora, Dutch New Zealanders

South African born population in New Zealand
Year	Pop.	±%
2001	26,061	—
2006	41,676	+59.9%
2013	54,276	+30.2%
2018	71,382	+31.5%
2023	95,577	+33.9%
Source: National censuses

South African New Zealanders are New Zealanders who were either born in South Africa or are descendants of South African migrants. As of the 2023 New Zealand census, there were 95,577 South African-born people resident in New Zealand, or 1.52% of the country's population, making South Africa the 5th largest source of immigrants in New Zealand behind the United Kingdom, China, India, and Australia. While South Africans have migrated to New Zealand since the 19th century, over 90 percent of South Africans in New Zealand today have migrated since the fall of apartheid in the early 1990s. Most South African New Zealanders are of White South African origin.

== Notable South African New Zealanders ==
- Megan Alatini, pop singer, actress and television personality
- Lesley-Anne Brandt, actress
- Karin Burger, netball player and current Silver Ferns
- Urzila Carlson, comedian and regular panelist on 7 Days
- Meryl Cassie, actress and singer
- Leana de Bruin, netball player
- Ryan De Vries, footballer
- Cheryl de la Rey, academic, Professor and Vice-Chancellor of University of Canterbury
- Wes Goosen, rugby union player
- Penny Hulse, local politician, Deputy Mayor of Auckland (2010–2016)
- Rex Mason, politician, Attorney General of New Zealand (1935–1949)
- Precious McKenzie, weightlifter
- Andrew Mehrtens, rugby union player
- James Musa, professional footballer
- Caren Pistorius, actress
- Greg Rawlinson, rugby union player
- Storm Roux, football player
- Faye Smythe, actress
- Irene van Dyk, netball player
- Kruger van Wyk, cricket player
- BJ Watling, NZ wicket-keeper in Test cricket
- Dale Pretorius, Visual-Effects Film veteran

== See also ==
- South African diaspora
- New Zealand–South Africa relations
- Immigration to New Zealand
- South African Australians
