= Široký Důl =

- Municipality
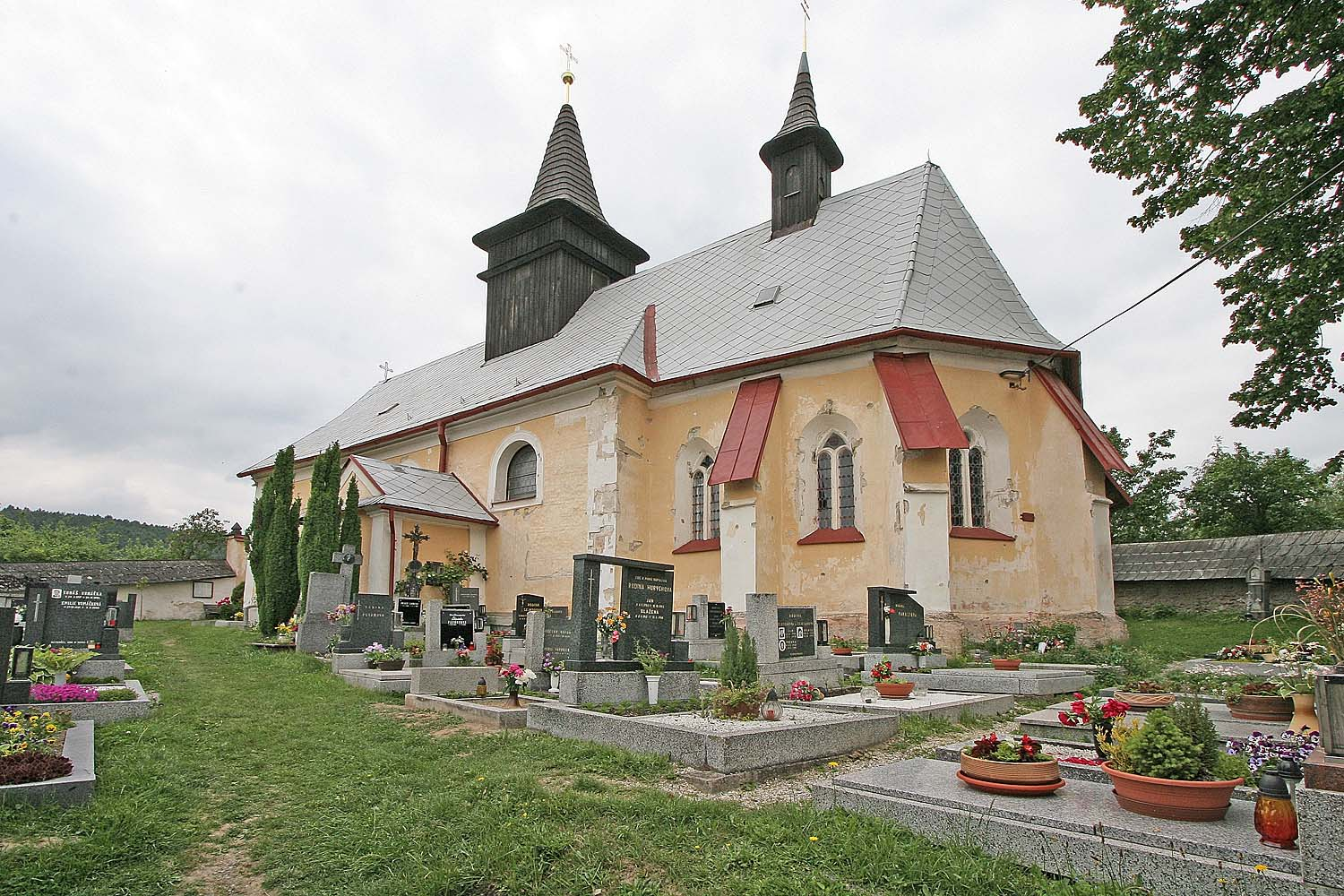
- Church of Saint John the Baptist

- Flag Coat of arms

- Location in the Czech Republic
- Coordinates: 49°44′46″N 16°13′15″E
- Country: Czech Republic
- Region: Pardubice
- District: Svitavy
- First mentioned: 1269

Area
  - Total: 6.02 km^{2} (2.32 sq mi)
- Elevation: 512 m (1,680 ft)

Population (2026-01-01)
  - Total: 397
  - Density: 65.9/km^{2} (171/sq mi)
- Time zone: UTC+1 (CET)
  - Summer (DST): UTC+2 (CEST)
- Postal code: 572 01
- Website: sirokydul.cz

Široký Důl (German: Breitenthal) is a municipality and village in Svitavy District in the Pardubice Region of the Czech Republic. It has about 400 inhabitants.

Široký Důl lies approximately 18 kilometres (11 mi) west of Svitavy, 46 km (29 mi) south-east of Pardubice, and 135 km (84 mi) east of Prague.

== Demographics ==
Historical population
| Year | Pop. | ±% |
|---|---|---|
| 1869 | 654 | — |
| 1880 | 660 | +0.9% |
| 1890 | 596 | −9.7% |
| 1900 | 585 | −1.8% |
| 1910 | 576 | −1.5% |
| 1921 | 570 | −1.0% |
| 1930 | 529 | −7.2% |
| 1950 | 394 | −25.5% |
| 1961 | 373 | −5.3% |
| 1970 | 345 | −7.5% |
| 1980 | 342 | −0.9% |
| 1991 | 358 | +4.7% |
| 2001 | 360 | +0.6% |
| 2011 | 373 | +3.6% |
| 2021 | 398 | +6.7% |
Source: Censuses
