= Fayhan al-Ghamdi =

Saudi Arabian television preacher

Fayhan al-Ghamdi (Arabic: فيحان الغامدي) is a Saudi Arabian television preacher and Muslim cleric who came to world attention in 2013 after being ordered to pay blood money for the murder of his five-year-old daughter, Lama. Though activists feared that he might be released after paying blood money, Al-Ghamdi was sentenced to receive 800 lashes and eight years' imprisonment.

== Career ==
Al-Ghamdi presented a television show on Saudi television.

== Daughter ==
In October 2012, Al-Ghamdi's daughter Lama died after spending seven months in hospital. She had been beaten, and was left with a crushed skull and a broken left arm and ribs. Al-Ghamdi admitted to having disciplined her with a cane and cable. He was reported to have been released after spending a couple of months in prison after paying Lama's mother a figure said to be equivalent to $267,000. On 7 October 2013, it was announced that Al-Ghamdi had been sentenced to 8 years in prison, plus 800 lashes. The sentence was reduced when the charge of sexual assault was dropped, the charge of manslaughter was also dropped and instead the court considered in its ruling only the charge of "excessive disciplining that resulted in death". It had previously been reduced to only four years, and with the new ruling it was changed to a mere three years.

== Public reaction ==
Saudi activists have objected to the ruling, and members of the public have been using the Twitter hashtag #AnaLama - Arabic for "I Am Lama".

Due to public anger, Saudi authorities have announced that they are planning to set up a 24-hour hotline to report child abuse.
